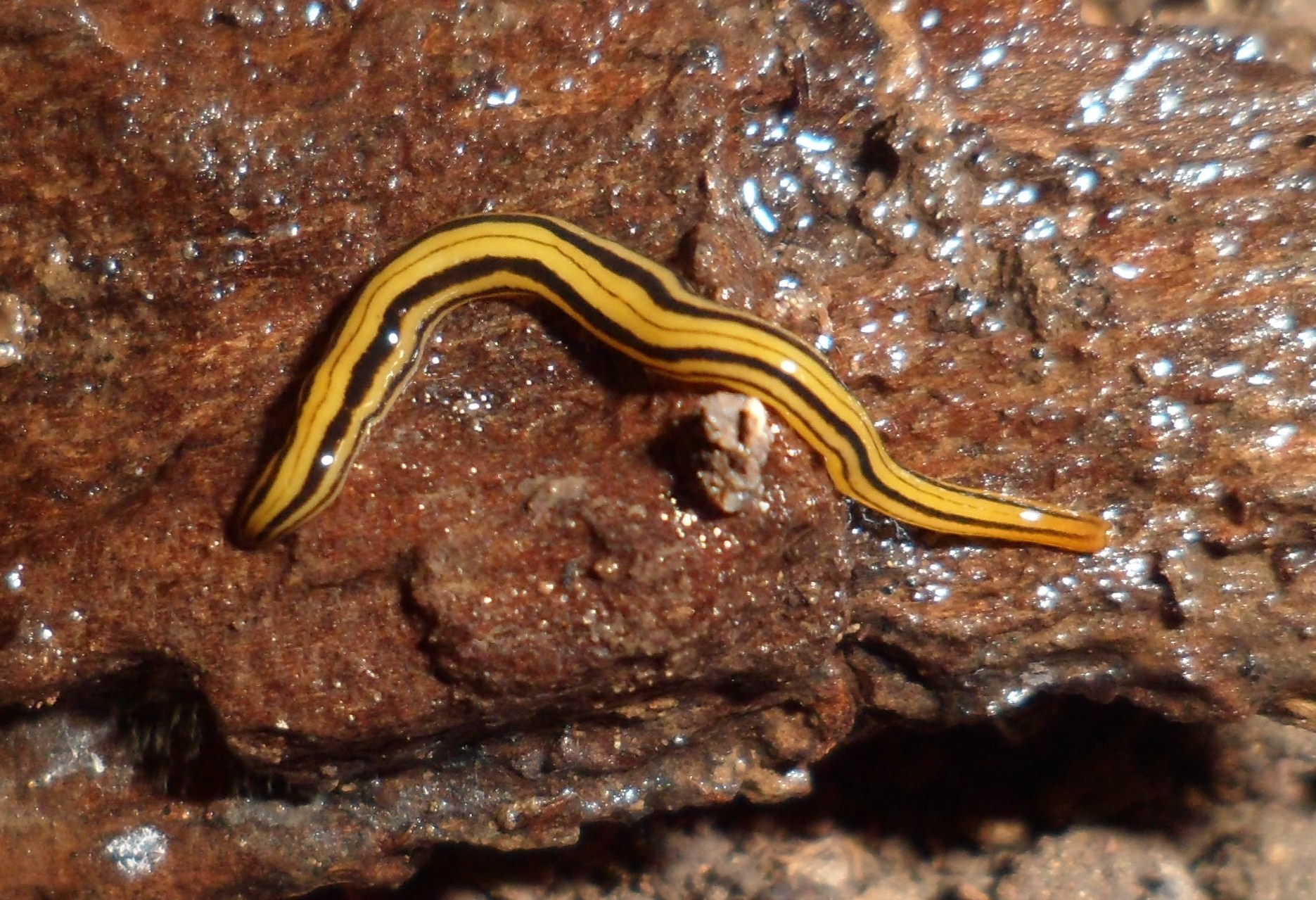
- Luteostriata graffi

Scientific classification
- Kingdom: Animalia
- Phylum: Platyhelminthes
- Order: Tricladida
- Family: Geoplanidae
- Subfamily: Geoplaninae
- Genus: Luteostriata; Carbayo, 2010

Type species
- Geoplana muelleri Diesing, 1861

= Luteostriata =

Genus of flatworms

Luteostriata is a genus of land planarians from Brazil characterized by a yellow body with dark longitudinal stripes.

== Description ==
The genus Luteostriata is characterized by the presence of a cephalic retractor muscle, which allows those animals to pull their anterior end upwards and backwards. Associated to the muscle are cephalic glands, forming a so-called cephalic musculo-glandular organ in a way similar to the one found in the genera Choeradoplana and Issoca. The copulatory apparatus has a reversible penis, i.e., there is no permanent penis papilla and the penis is formed during copulation by folds in the male cavity which are pushed outwards.

Externally, species in this genus usually have a yellow to light brown dorsal color with a series of longitudinal dark stripes, hence the name Luteostriata, from Latin luteus (saffron yellow) + striatus (striped). The anterior end is also usually marked by an orange tinge that posteriorly gradually fades into the yellow color of the dorsum.

== Species ==
There are 11 described species in the genus Luteostriata:

- Luteostriata abundans (von Graff, 1899)
- Luteostriata arturi (Lemos & Leal-Zanchet, 2008)
- Luteostriata caissara (Froehlich, 1954)
- Luteostriata ceciliae (Froehlich & Leal-Zanchet, 2003)
- Luteostriata dissimilis Iturralde & Leal-Zanchet, 2022
- Luteostriata ernesti (Leal-Zanchet & Froehlich, 2006)
- Luteostriata fita (Froehlich, 1959)
- Luteostriata graffi (Leal-Zanchet & Froehlich, 2006)
- Luteostriata muelleri (Diesing, 1861)
- Luteostriata pseudoceciliae (Lemos & Leal-Zanchet, 2008)
- Luteostriata subtilis Boll, Amaral & Leal-Zanchet, 2019

== Taxonomic history ==
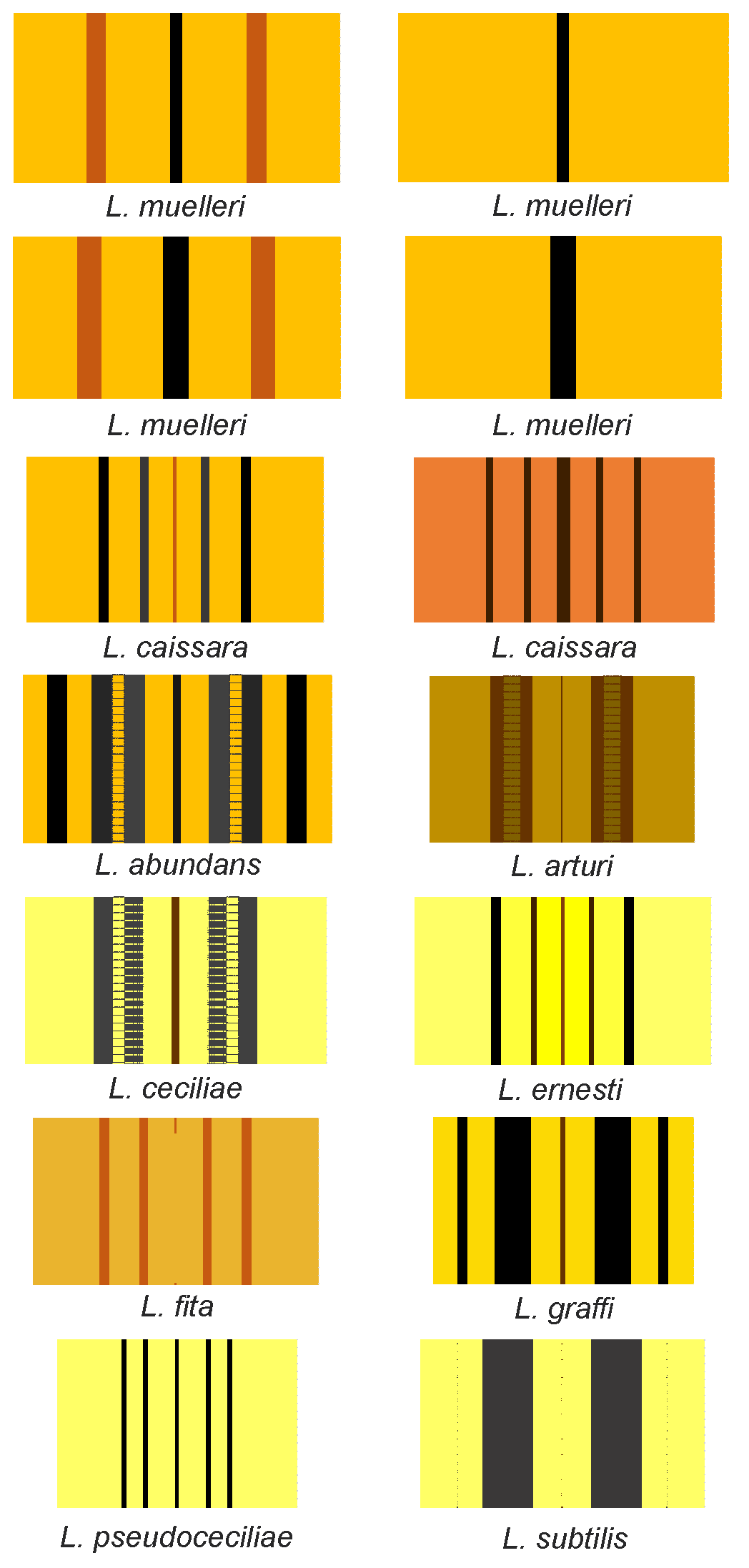
Dorsal color pattern of all currently described species of Luteostriata

The first species of Luteostriata was described in 1857 by Max Schultze and Fritz Müller as a Brazilian yellow planarian with a broad black longitudinal stripe in the middle of the back and a narrow deep orange stripe on each side of it. They identified it as Planaria elegans, a species described by Darwin, and put it in their new genus Geoplana. Later, in 1861, Karl Moriz Diesing noticed that the description of Schultze and Müller's species did not match with that of Darwin's and renamed it Geoplana mülleri.

In 1899, Ludwig von Graff published his famous monography on land planarians and described some specimens of yellow land planarians with five or seven black stripes that were sent to him from Rio Grande do Sul, Brazil. He identified them as Geoplana marginata, a species described by Schultze and Müller in the same publication in which they misidentified Geoplana elegans. Graff ended up making a similar mistake, as Schultze and Müller's Geoplana marginata was a black species with yellow stripes while Graff's was yellow with black stripes. Specimens with seven stripes instead of only five were considered a variety of Geoplana marginata and named Geoplana marginata var. abundans because of the "abundant" number of stripes.

In the following decades, several authors, such as Albert Riester and Ernst Marcus, continued to identify most Brazilian yellow planarians with 5 or 7 dark longitudinal stripes as Geoplana marginata. In 1955, Eudóxia Maria Froehlich noticed that Riester's species was different from the specimens analyzed by Graff and Marcus and renamed Riester's material as Geoplana caissara. In 1959, Claudio Gilberto Froehlich elevated Geoplana marginata var. abundans to the level of species as Geoplana abundans. He also noticed that G. marginata sensu Graff and G. marginata sensu Marcus could not be G. marginata Schultze & Müller, but did not rename them. In the same paper he also described a new yellow species with dark stripes and named it Geoplana fita.

In 1990, Robert E. Ogren and Masaharu Kawakatsu transferred G. marginata (based on the descriptions by Graff and Marcus) to the genus Notogynaphallia along with G. caissara, G. abundans, G. fita and several other species.

More than a decade later, from 2001 to 2006, Eudóxia Maria Froehlich and Ana Maria Leal-Zanchet analyzed the complex G. marginata (at the time Notogynaphallia marginata) and renamed G. marginata sensu Graff as Notogynaphallia graffi and G. marginata sensu Marcus as Notogynaphallia ernesti. They also described a new species with the same pattern, naming it Notogynaphallia ceciliae and pointed out that N. caissara, N. abundans, N. graffi, N. ernesti and N. ceciliae, and possibly also N. muelleri and N. fita, formed a complex of closely related species within the genus Notogynaphallia. Finally, in 2010, Fernando Carbayo transferred this species complex to a new genus, naming it Luteostriata.

== Phylogeny ==
Species of Luteostriata have a similar morphology, including a similar color pattern, a musculo-glandular cephalic organ with a retractor muscle that is lens-shaped in cross-section, a long and folded male atrium and a prostatic vesicle located outside the muscular coat that envelops the copulatory organs. However, a molecular study on the phylogeny of the subfamily Geoplaninae suggested that Luteostriata is possibly paraphyletic, forming a monophyletic clade with the genera Issoca and Supramontana. The clade is supported by at least one synapomorphy, the presence of a cephalic retractor muscle derived from the longitudinal cutaneous ventral musculature that anteriorly dissipates by detaching its fibers, making them open in a fan-like fashion towards the body margins.

- - Issoca rezendei
  - - Luteostriata graffi
    - - Luteostriata graffi
      - - Luteostriata sp. 1
        - - Luteostriata sp.
          - - - Luteostriata muelleri
              - - Luteostriata ernesti
                - Luteostriata sp. 2
            - - - Luteostriata ernesti?
                - - Luteostriata ceciliae
                  - Luteostriata abundans
              - - Supramontana irritata
                - - Issoca assanga
                  - Issoca jandaia
