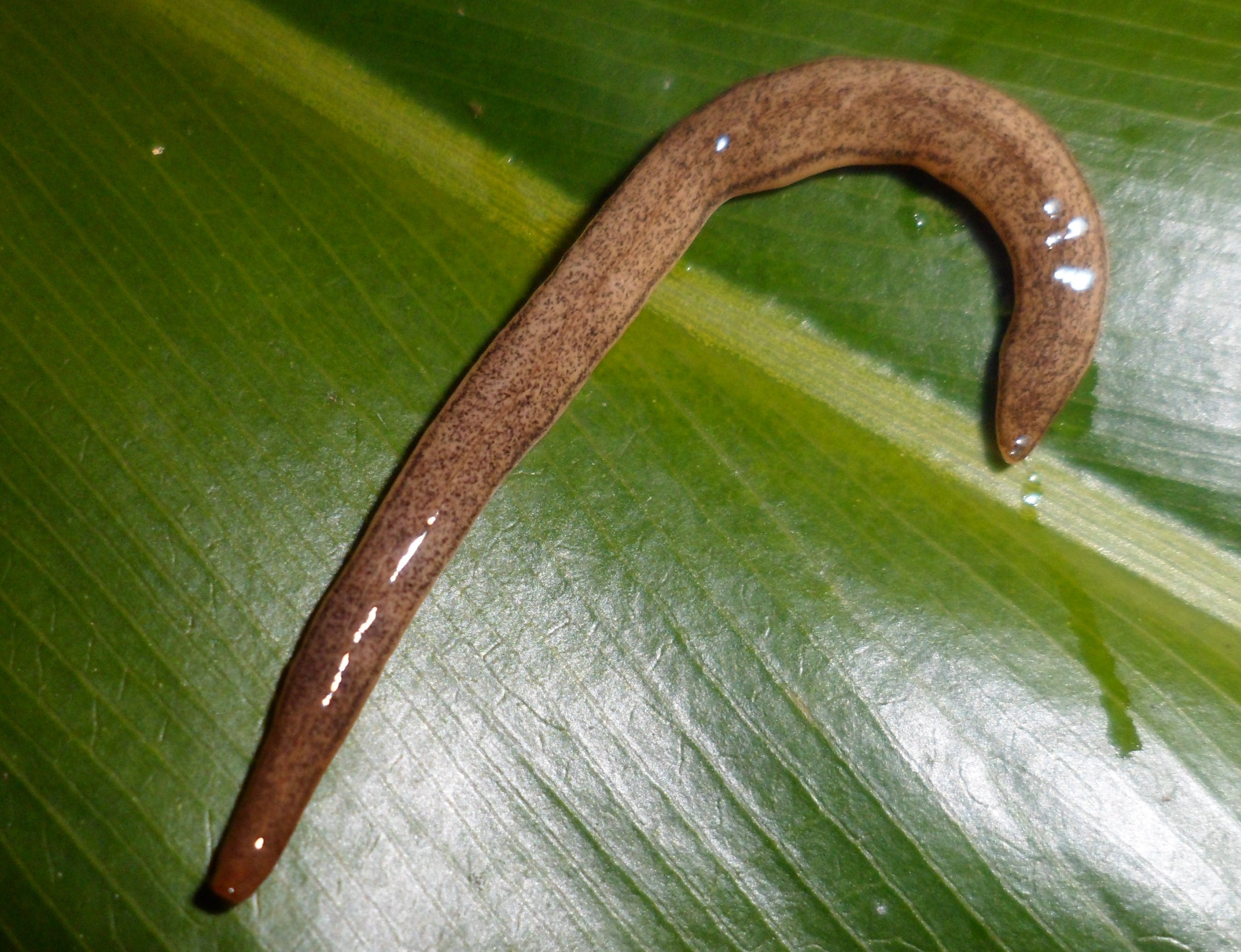
- Supramontana irritata

Scientific classification
- Kingdom: Animalia
- Phylum: Platyhelminthes
- Order: Tricladida
- Family: Geoplanidae
- Subfamily: Geoplaninae
- Genus: Supramontana; Carbayo & Leal-Zanchet, 2003

Type species
- Supramontana irritata Carbayo & Leal-Zanchet, 2003

= Supramontana =

Genus of flatworms

Supramontana is a genus of land planarians from South America.

== Description ==
The genus Supramontana is characterized by the presence of a cephalic retractor muscle not associated with cephalic glands. This muscle is similar to the one found in the genera Issoca and Luteostriata, but in Supramontana the organ lacks cephalic glands, which are present in the other two genera.

The copulatory apparatus of Supramontana has a permanent penis papilla and a long common ovovitelloduct.

== Etymology ==
The name Supramontana comes from the Latin words supra (on the top) and montanus (of the mountains). It is a reference to the type-locality of Supramontana irritata, the city of São Francisco de Paula, in Southern Brazil, whose previous name was São Francisco de Paula de Cima da Serra (on the top of the mountains).

== Species ==
There are two described species in the genus Supramontana:

- Supramontana argentina Negrete et al., 2014
- Supramontana irritata Carbayo & Leal-Zanchet, 2003

== Phylogeny ==
A molecular study on the phylogeny of the subfamily Geoplaninae nested the genus Supramontana inside the genus Luteostriata. The two genera formed a monophyletic clade with the genus Issoca. The clade is supported by at least one synapomorphy, the presence of a cephalic retractor muscle derived from the longitudinal cutaneous ventral musculature that anteriorly dissipates by detaching its fibers, making them open in a fan-like fashion towards the body margins.

- - Issoca rezendei
  - - Luteostriata graffi
    - - Luteostriata graffi
      - - Luteostriata sp. 1
        - - Luteostriata sp.
          - - - Luteostriata muelleri
              - - Luteostriata ernesti
                - Luteostriata sp. 2
            - - - Luteostriata ernesti?
                - - Luteostriata ceciliae
                  - Luteostriata abundans
              - - Supramontana irritata
                - - Issoca sp. 1
                  - Issoca jandaia
