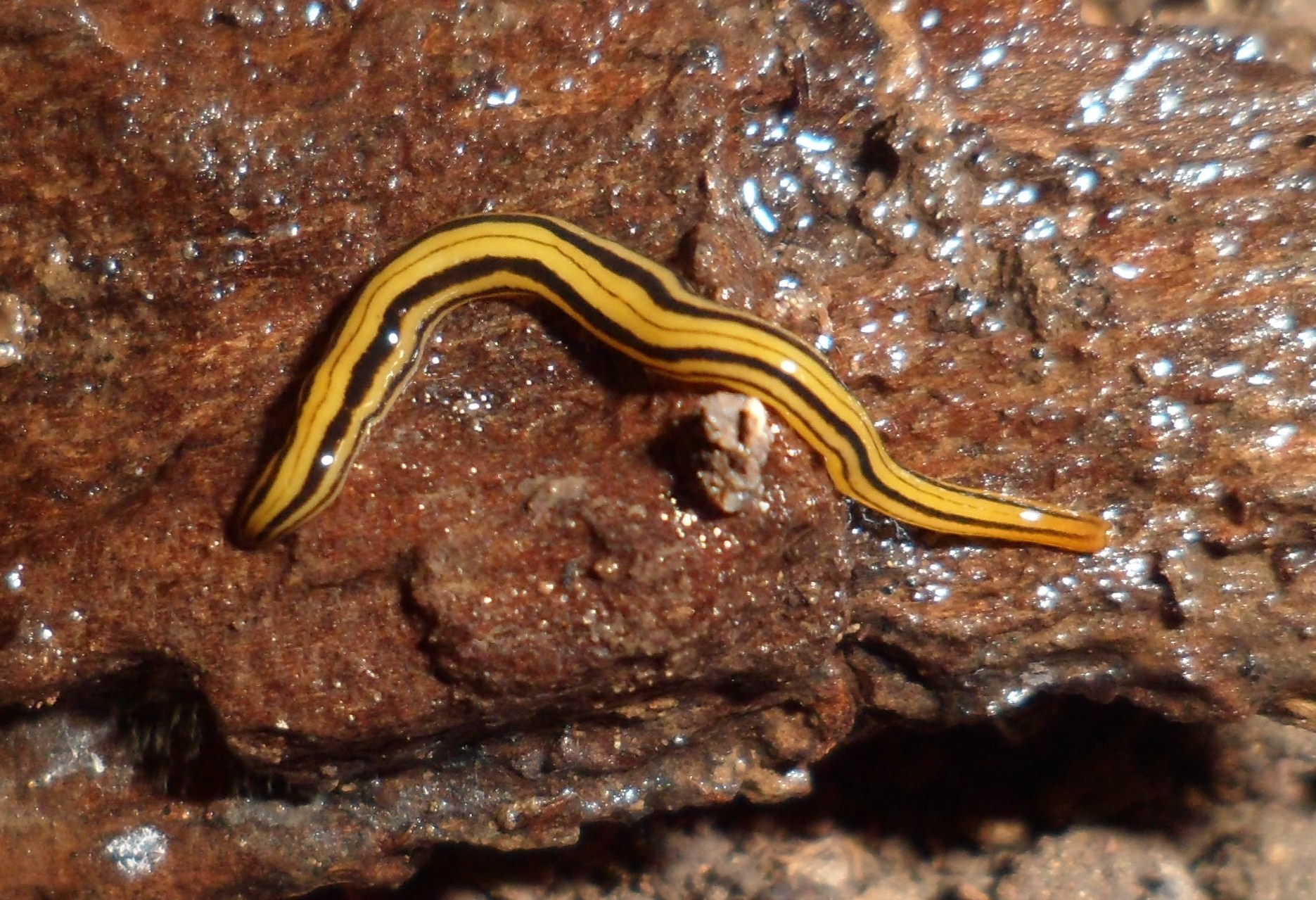
- Luteostriata graffi, head on the right

Scientific classification
- Kingdom: Animalia
- Phylum: Platyhelminthes
- Order: Tricladida
- Family: Geoplanidae
- Genus: Luteostriata
- Species: L. graffi

Binomial name
- Luteostriata graffi (Leal-Zanchet & Froehlich, 2006)

Synonyms
- Geoplana marginata Schultze & Müller, 1857 sensu von Graff, 1899 (in part); Notogynaphallia marginata Ogren, Kawakatsu & Froehlich, 1992; Notogynaphallia graffi Leal-Zanchet & Froehlich, 2006

= Luteostriata graffi =

Species of flatworm

Luteostriata graffi is a species of Brazilian land planarian in the subfamily Geoplaninae.

== Description ==
Luteostriata graffi is a relatively small land planarian, reaching up to 50 millimetres (2.0 in) in length when crawling. The dorsal color is gold-yellow with five black longitudinal stripes: one median, two paramedian and two lateral, the median being the thinnest and the paramedian the broadest. The anterior end has a slight orange tinge and the ventral side is yellowish white.

== Etymology ==
The specific epithet graffi honors the zoologist Ludwig von Graff, who first described the species, but misidentified it as Geoplana marginata Schultze & Müller, 1858.

== Distribution ==
Luteostrata graffi is known to occur in areas of Araucaria moist forest and Seasonal forests in the northeastern region of Rio Grande do Sul, Brazil. It occurs in the São Francisco de Paula National Forest and in the Aparados da Serra National Park.
