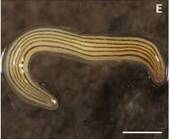
- Luteostriata ernesti from São Paulo

Scientific classification
- Kingdom: Animalia
- Phylum: Platyhelminthes
- Order: Tricladida
- Family: Geoplanidae
- Genus: Luteostriata
- Species: L. ernesti

Binomial name
- Luteostriata ernesti (Leal-Zanchet & Froehlich, 2006)

Synonyms
- Geoplana marginata Schultze & Müller, 1857 sensu Marcus, 1951 (in part); Notogynaphallia marginata Ogren, Kawakatsu & Froehlich, 1992; Notogynaphallia ernesti Leal-Zanchet & Froehlich, 2006

= Luteostriata ernesti =

Species of flatworm

Luteostriata ernesti is a species of Brazilian land planarian in the subfamily Geoplaninae.

== Description ==
Luteostriata ernesti is a medium to small land planarian, reaching up to 70 millimetres (2.8 in) in length when crawling. The dorsal color is light-yellow with five dark longitudinal stripes: one median, two paramedian and two lateral. The anterior end has a darker, often orange tinge and the ventral side is yellowish white.

== Etymology ==
The specific epithet ernesti honors the zoologist Ernst Marcus, who first described the species, but misidentified it as Geoplana marginata Schultze & Müller, 1858.

== Distribution ==
Luteostrata ernesti is found in Brazil, from São Paulo to Paraná, in areas of Araucaria moist forest, Subtropical Atlantic forest and Seasonal forests. It occurs in the São Paulo Botanical Garden. Populations found in the São Francisco de Paula National Forest in the state of Rio Grande do Sul, originally considered conspecific with L. ernesti, are now considered a separate species, L. dissimilis.
