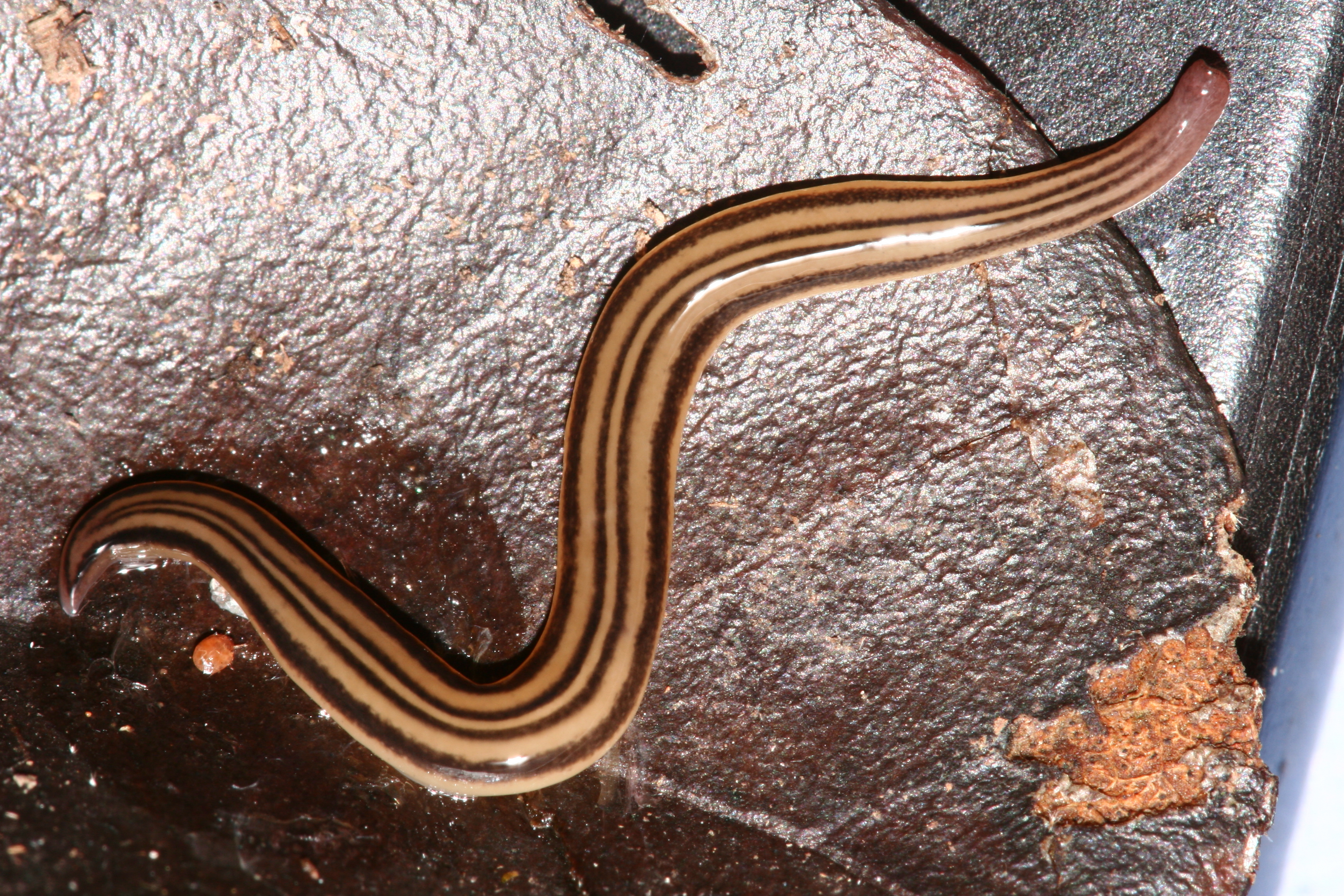
- Issoca rezendei

Scientific classification
- Kingdom: Animalia
- Phylum: Platyhelminthes
- Order: Tricladida
- Family: Geoplanidae
- Subfamily: Geoplaninae
- Genus: Issoca; Froehlich, 1955

Type species
- Geoplana rezendei Schirch, 1929

= Issoca =

Genus of flatworms

Issoca is a genus of land planarians found in Brazil.

== Description ==
Species of the genus Issoca are characterized by the presence of a spoon-shaped head having a cephalic retractor muscle, which allows those animals to pull their anterior end upwards and backwards. Associated to the muscle are cephalic glands, forming a so-called cephalic musculo-glandular organ in a way similar to the one found in the genera Choeradoplana and Luteostriata. The copulatory apparatus usually lacks a permanent penis papilla, i. e., the penis is formed during copulation by folds in the male cavity which are pushed outwards.

== Etymology ==
The name Issoca comes from Tupi içoca (worm, maggot).

== Species ==
There are five described species in the genus Issoca:

- Issoca assanga Araujo & Carbayo, 2018
- Issoca jandaia Froehlich, 1955
- Issoca piranga Froehlich, 1955
- Issoca potyra Froehlich, 1957
- Issoca rezendei (Schirch, 1929)
- Issoca spatulata (Graff, 1899)
