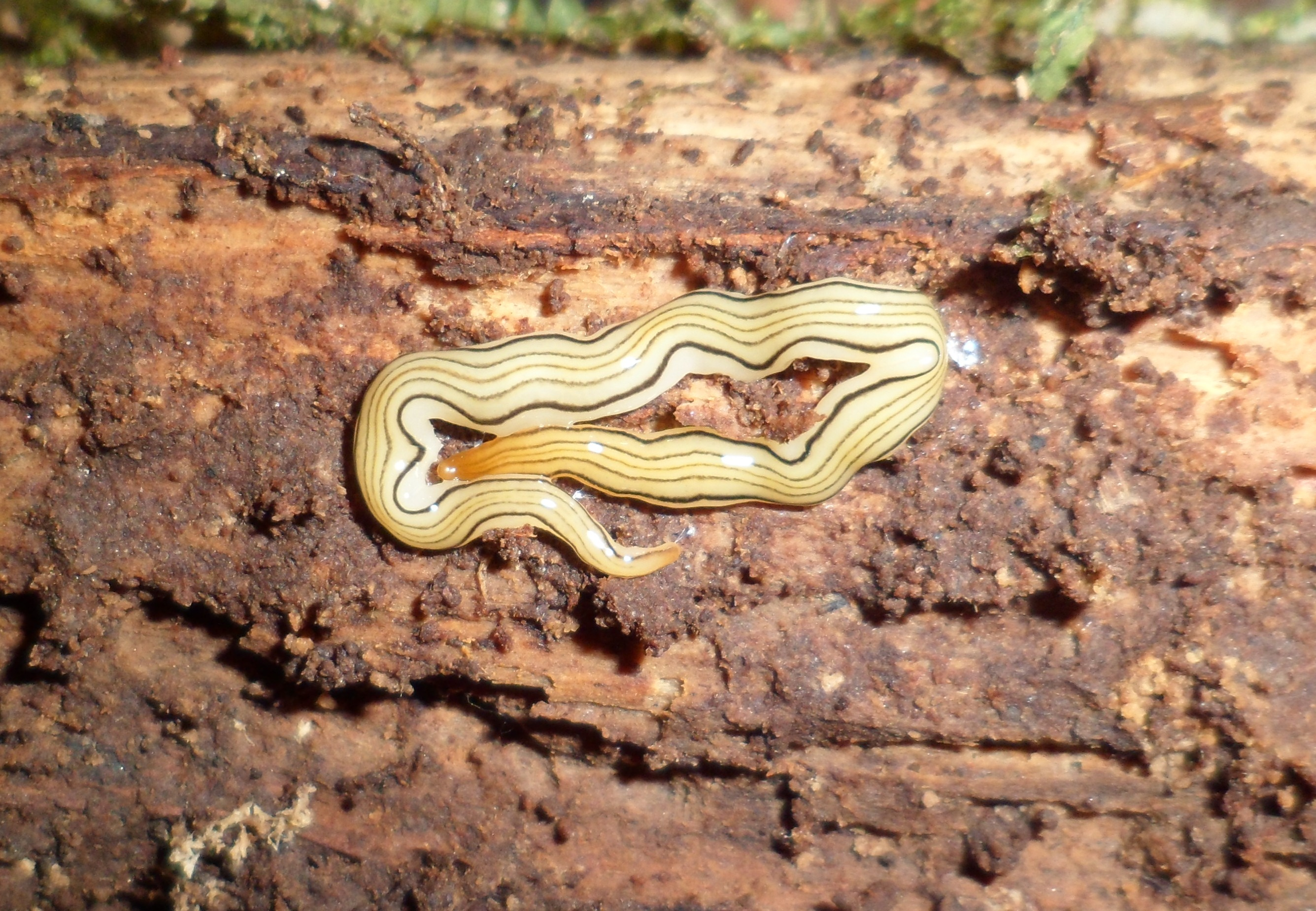
- Luteostriata dissimilis in the São Francisco de Paula National Forest

Scientific classification
- Kingdom: Animalia
- Phylum: Platyhelminthes
- Order: Tricladida
- Family: Geoplanidae
- Genus: Luteostriata
- Species: L. dissimilis

Binomial name
- Luteostriata dissimilis Iturralde & Leal-Zanchet, 2022

= Luteostriata dissimilis =

Species of flatworm

Luteostriata dissimilis is a species of Brazilian land planarian in the subfamily Geoplaninae.

== Description ==
Luteostriata dissimilis is a medium to small land planarian, reaching up to 60 millimetres (2.4 in) in length when crawling. The dorsal color is light-yellow with a more or less orange head and five dark longitudinal stripes: one median, two paramedian and two lateral. The median stripe begins behind the head and is often discontinuous along the body, whereas the other stripes start at the head and extend close to the posterior end. The lateral stripes are the widest and the median stripe the narrowest. The ventral side is pale yellow.

== Etymology ==
The specific epithet dissimilis (dissimilar, different), refers to the differences between this species and Luteostriata ernesti, with which it was originally considered conspecific.

== Distribution ==
Luteostrata dissimilis occurs in areas of Araucaria moist forest and Seasonal forests in the northeastern region of Rio Grande do Sul, Brazil. It occurs in the São Francisco de Paula National Forest, its type locality.
