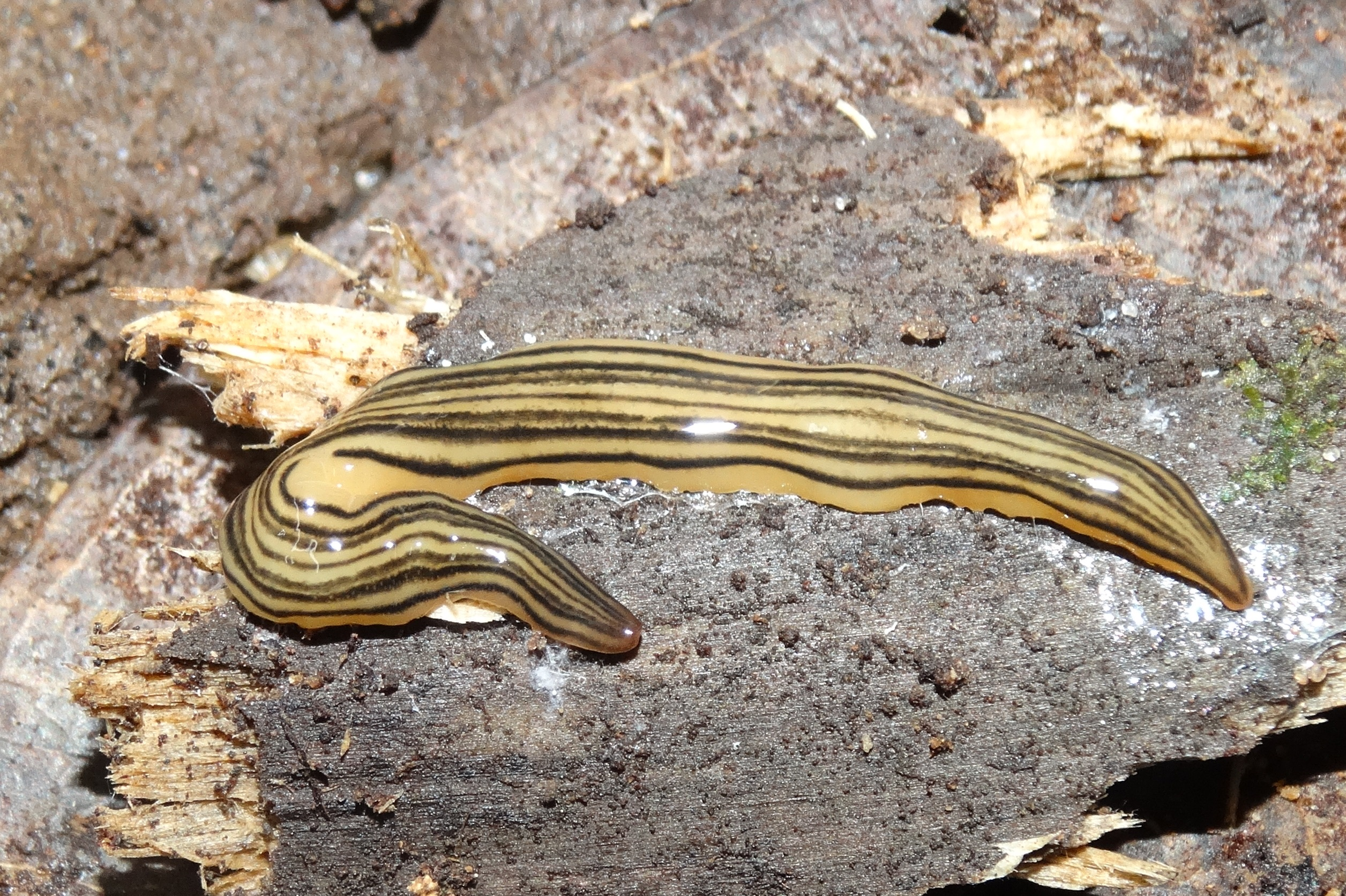

Scientific classification
- Kingdom: Animalia
- Phylum: Platyhelminthes
- Order: Tricladida
- Family: Geoplanidae
- Genus: Luteostriata
- Species: L. abundans

Binomial name
- Luteostriata abundans (von Graff, 1899)

Synonyms
- Geoplana marginata var. abundans von Graff, 1899; Geoplana abundans Froehlich, 1959; Notogynaphallia abundans Ogren & Kawakatsu, 1990

= Luteostriata abundans =

Species of flatworm

Luteostriata abundans is a species of Brazilian land planarian in the subfamily Geoplaninae. It is a common species in human-disturbed areas in Brazil's southernmost state, Rio Grande do Sul.

== Description ==
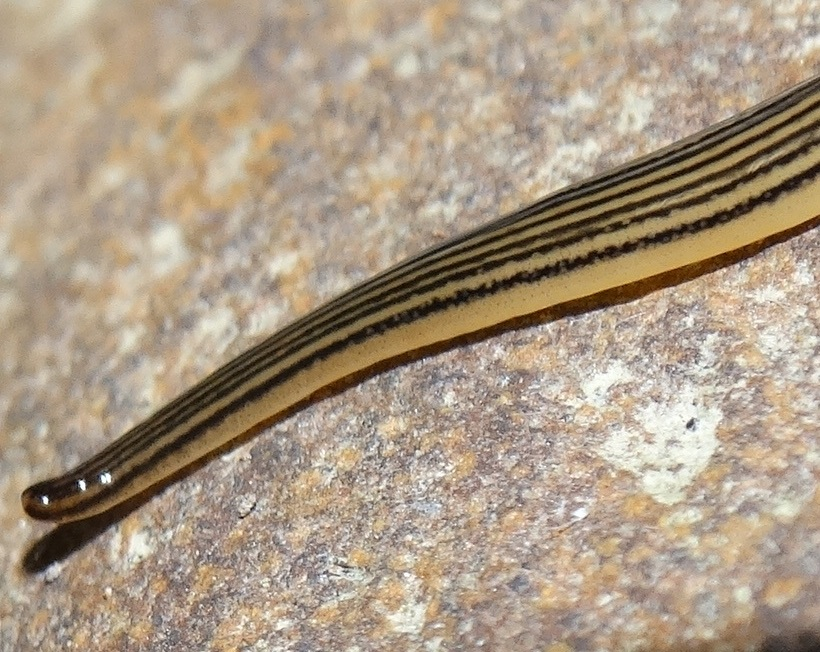
Detail of anterior region of L. abundans showing the small eyes and the clear halos around the dorsal eyes in the two most marginal stripes.

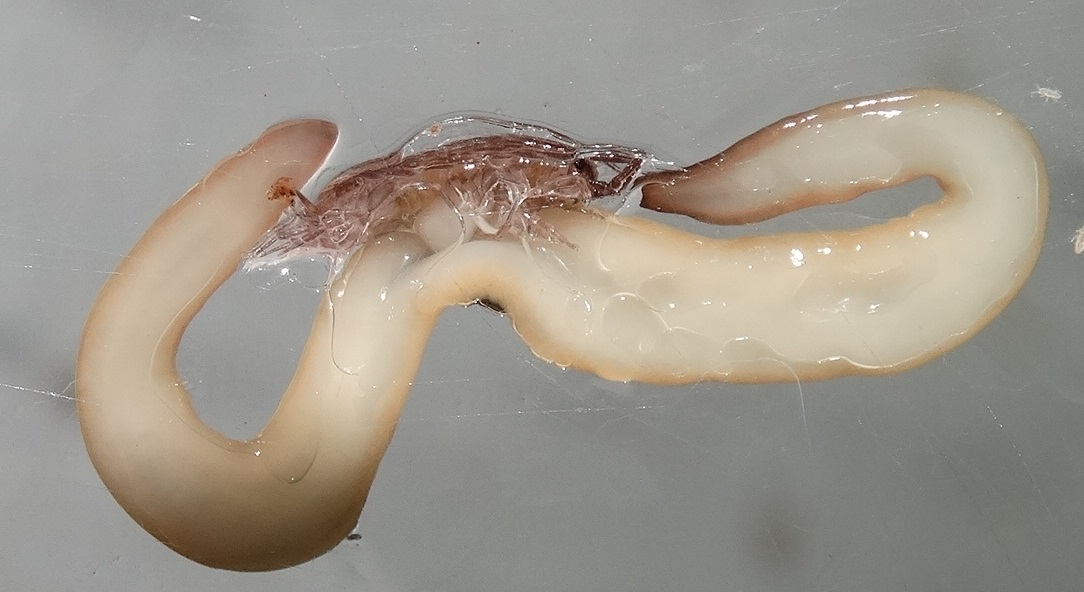
Ventral view of L. abundans eating a woodlouse. The pharynx can be seen penetrating the venter of the woodlouse.

Luteostriata abundans is a small to medium-sized land planarian with an elongate body and parallel margins. The largest specimens have a length of about 60 millimeters or more. The dorsum has a yellow tinge, varying from cream to dark yellow or light brown and is marked by seven longitudinal dark brown to black stripes. The ventral side is cream. The presence of seven stripes distinguishes it from other members of Luteostriata.

The numerous eyes are very small and hardly visible to the naked eye. They are distributed marginally on the first millimeters of the body and posteriorly become dorsal, covering the two most external stripes on each side. The eyes that cover the stripes are surrounded by halos, zones without pigmentation, which may be perceived as small clear dots.

Its prostatic vesicle is elongated and non-bifurcated.

== Distribution ==
Luteostriata abundans is found in human-disturbed areas and borders of semi-deciduous and deciduous seasonal forests in the region surrounding the Porto Alegre Metropolitan Area, state of Rio Grande do Sul, Brazil.

== Diet ==
In the laboratory, the diet of L. abundans includes exclusively woodlice, which seem to constitute the main or only prey of most species in the genus Luteostriata.

Luteostriata abundans captures the prey by the use of quick muscular movements and adhesive secretions. As soon as the planarian touches the prey, it coils around it and starts to secrete mucus. The planarian then glides over the prey to bring it to the level of the mouth and everts the pharynx, piercing the woodlouse between its segments and beginning the ingestion of its contents.
