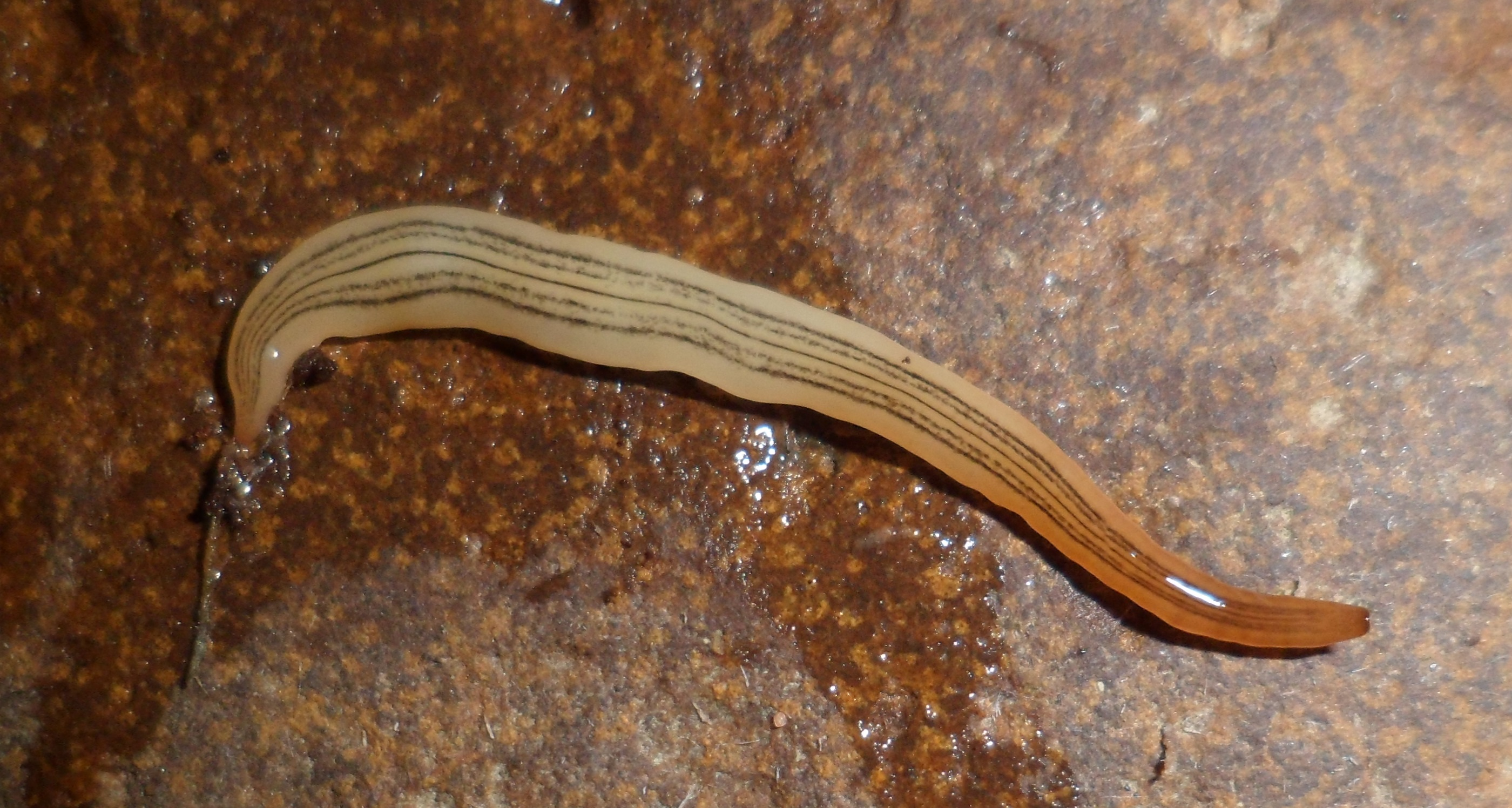
- Luteostriata ceciliae, head on the right

Scientific classification
- Kingdom: Animalia
- Phylum: Platyhelminthes
- Order: Tricladida
- Family: Geoplanidae
- Genus: Luteostriata
- Species: L. ceciliae

Binomial name
- Luteostriata ceciliae (Froehlich & Leal-Zanchet, 2003)

Synonyms
- Notogynaphallia ceciliae Froehlich & Leal-Zanchet, 2003

= Luteostriata ceciliae =

Species of flatworm

Luteostriata ceciliae is a species of Brazilian land planarian in the subfamily Geoplaninae.

== Description ==
Luteostriata ceciliae is a medium to small land planarian, reaching up to 63 millimetres (2.5 in) in length when crawling. The dorsal color is light-yellow with five dark longitudinal stripes: one median, two paramedian and two lateral. The median stripe is the thinnest and darkest, being well marked and delimited. The paramedian and lateral stripes are broader, but not well marked, being formed by a series of pigment spots and somewhat discontinuous. There are isolated pigment spots between the paramedian and lateral stripes. The anterior end of the body is marked by an orange tinge. The ventral side is yellowish white. There is a wide marginal zone without stripes, which sets L. ceciliae apart from other members of Luteostriata.

The numerous small eyes occur along the entire body, forming a single row on the body margins in the first millimetres and posteriorly spreading to the dorsum, reaching the lateral stripes.

The species' branched efferent ducts additionally distinguish it from other members of Luteostriata.

== Etymology ==
The specific epithet was given in honor of Maria Cecília Braun, for her contributions of land flatworm collections to the Instituto de Pesquisas de Planárias at Unisinos and her years dedicated to the study of that material.

== Distribution ==
The only known place of occurrence of L. ceciliae is the São Francisco de Paula National Forest in southern Brazil.
