= Walter Narchi =

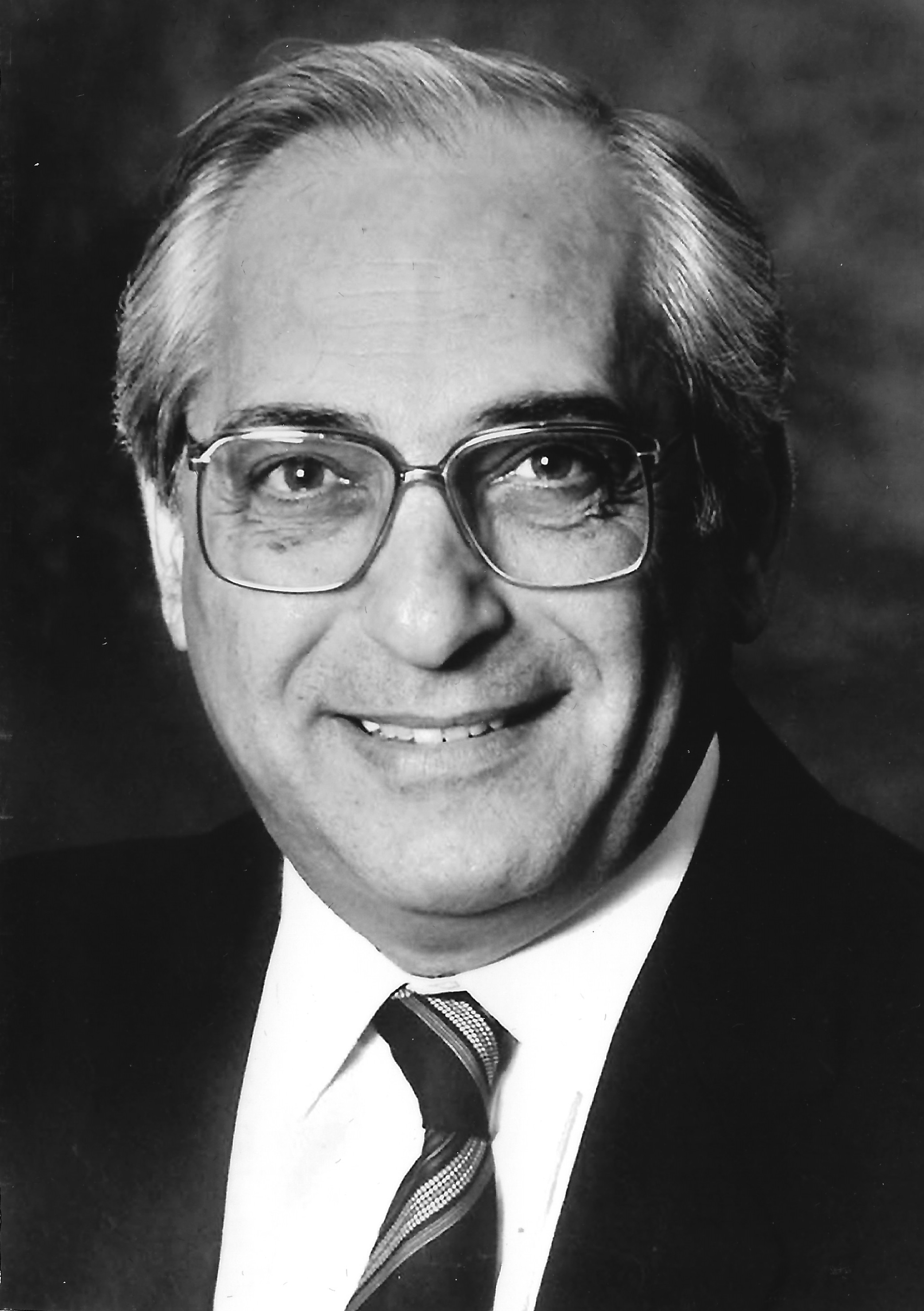
Walter Narchi 1981

Walter Narchi (September 2, 1929, in São Paulo – June 23, 2004, in São Paulo) was a Brazilian marine biologist. He mainly researched the anatomy of bivalvia and from 1960 to 2004 wrote over 60 papers, some with original descriptions of new species of this class.

== Life and accomplishments ==
=== Scientific career ===
Walter Narchi studied natural history at the University of São Paulo from 1951 to 1954. From 1955 to 1960 he studied foraminifera and in 1960 he graduated with the thesis Sobre Lagenidae e Nodosariidae recentes do Brasil (Foraminifera) (On extant Lagenidae and Nodosariidae of Brazil). His doctorate was supervised by the German scientist of Jewish ancestry Ernst Marcus (1893–1968), who emigrated to Brazil in 1936 with his wife Eveline du Bois-Reymond Marcus.

In 1967, Narchi was invited as a visiting scientist by the University of the Pacific in Stockton, California. From January to December 1967, he conducted research at the Pacific Marine Station, Dillon Beach, Marin County, California, where he was assisted by Director Edmund H. Smith.

Back in Brazil, Narchi accepted Paulo Sawaya's invitation in 1968 to found and oversee the zoology department of the Faculdade de Filosofia, Ciencias e Letras de Rio Claro, today Universidade Estadual Paulista, while at the same time working as a researcher in the zoology department of the University of São Paulo.

In 1977, at the invitation of Brian Morton from the University of Hong Kong, Narchi took part in the First International Workshop on the Malacofauna of Hong Kong and South China in Hong Kong. Research in Hong Kong resulted in two publications.

From 1977 to 1981 he was head of the zoological department of the Institute of Biosciences at the University of São Paulo. Narchi became a professor at the University of São Paulo in 1981. From 1981-1985 he was director of the institute for biosciences at his university as the successor to Diva Diniz Corrêa.

Narchi's numerous students include the later Brazilian environmental secretary Paulo Nogueira Neto.

=== Private and family ===
Narchi was born in 1929 to a Greek Orthodox family who emigrated to São Paulo from Homs, Syria. He married his wife Estela Aparecida Narchi (born Pasqualini, in Santa Ernestina, São Paulo, 1932), who also studied natural history at the University of São Paulo and taught biology as a high school teacher. The couple had three children. Narchi named the Brazilian bivalve Petricola stellae, which he discovered in 1975, after his wife Estela.

== Further activities ==
After field trips in the state of Bahia, Narchi recognized the need to create a marine national park in the Abrolhos region in 1969 and initiated this together with Aílton Brandão Joly and Eduardo Cyrino de Oliveira-Filho. In his constant commitment to the environment, Narchi was a member of the scientific committee of the Associação de Defesa da Flora e Fauna (ADFF) (Association for the Protection of the Fauna and Flora of Brazil) from 1973 to 1976, today: Associação de Defesa do Meio Ambiente (ADEMA- SP) and from 1979 to 1987 member of the board of the Fundação Parque Zoológico de São Paulo (FPZSP) (Foundation of São Paulo Zoological Garden). From 1981 to 1991, Narchi continued as president of the Sociedade Brasileira de Malacologia (SBM) (Brazilian Malacozoological Society) for environmental protection and for the promotion of malacology in Brazil.

== Species descriptions ==
- Lagena ycatupe Narchi, 1962
- Fissurina coacatu Narchi, 1962
- Fissurina evelinae Narchi, 1962
- Fissurina juruta Narchi, 1962
- Nodosaria boigra Narchi, 1962
- Saracenaria tayaçu Narchi, 1962
- Ceratobornia cema Narchi, 1966
- Petricola stellae Narchi, 1975
- Eutima sapinhoa Narchi & Hebling, 1975

== Dedication names ==
- Mysella narchii Passos & Domaneschi, 2006

== Selected works ==
- Narchi, W.; Dario, F. . Functional morphology of Tivela ventricosa (Gray, 1838) (Bivalvia: Veneridae). The Nautilus, Philadelphia, USA, Vol. 116, Nr.1, p. 13–24, 2002.
- Narchi, W.; Passos, F. D.; Domaneschi, O. . Bivalves Antárticos e Subantárticos coletados durante as Expedições Científicas Brasileiras à Antártica I a IX (1982–1991). Revista Brasileira de Zoologia, Brasilien, Vol. 19, Nr.3, p. 645–675, 2002.
- Narchi, W.; Lopes, S. G. B. C. Functional Anatomy of Nausitora fusticula (Jeffreys, 1860) (Bivalvia: Teredinidae). The Veliger, USA, Vol. 41, Nr.3, S. 274–288, 1998.
- Narchi, W.; Domaneschi, O. . An anomalous Specimen of Petricola stella (Narchi, 1975) from the Littoral of the State of São Paulo, Brazil. The Veliger, USA, Vol. 38, Nr.3, p. 270–272, 1995
- Narchi, W.. Functional Anatomy of a new Petricola (Mollusca: Bivalvia) from the Littoral of São Paulo, Brazil. Proceedings of the Malacological Society of London, England, Vol.41, Nr.5, p. 451–465, 1975.
- Narchi, W.; Hebling, N. J. . The Life Cicle of the Commensal Hydromedusa Eutima sapinhoa (new species). Marine Biology, USA, Vol.30, p. 73–78, 1975.
- Narchi, W.. Comparative Study of the functional morphology of Anomalocardia brasiliana (Gmelin, 1791) and Tivela mactroides (Born, 1778) (Bivalvia: Veneridae). Bulletin of Marine Sciences, USA, Vol. 22, Nr.3, p. 643–670, 1972.

In order to close gaps in Portuguese-language didactic literature, Narchi also published the following textbooks:

- Narchi, W.. A Cobra – Vertebrados – Edart Livraria Limitada – São Paulo 1973.
- Narchi, W.. Crustáceos – Estudos Práticos – Editora Polygono Limitada e EDUSP – São Paulo 1973.
- Narchi, W.. A Barata – Edart Livraria Limitada – São Paulo 1967.
