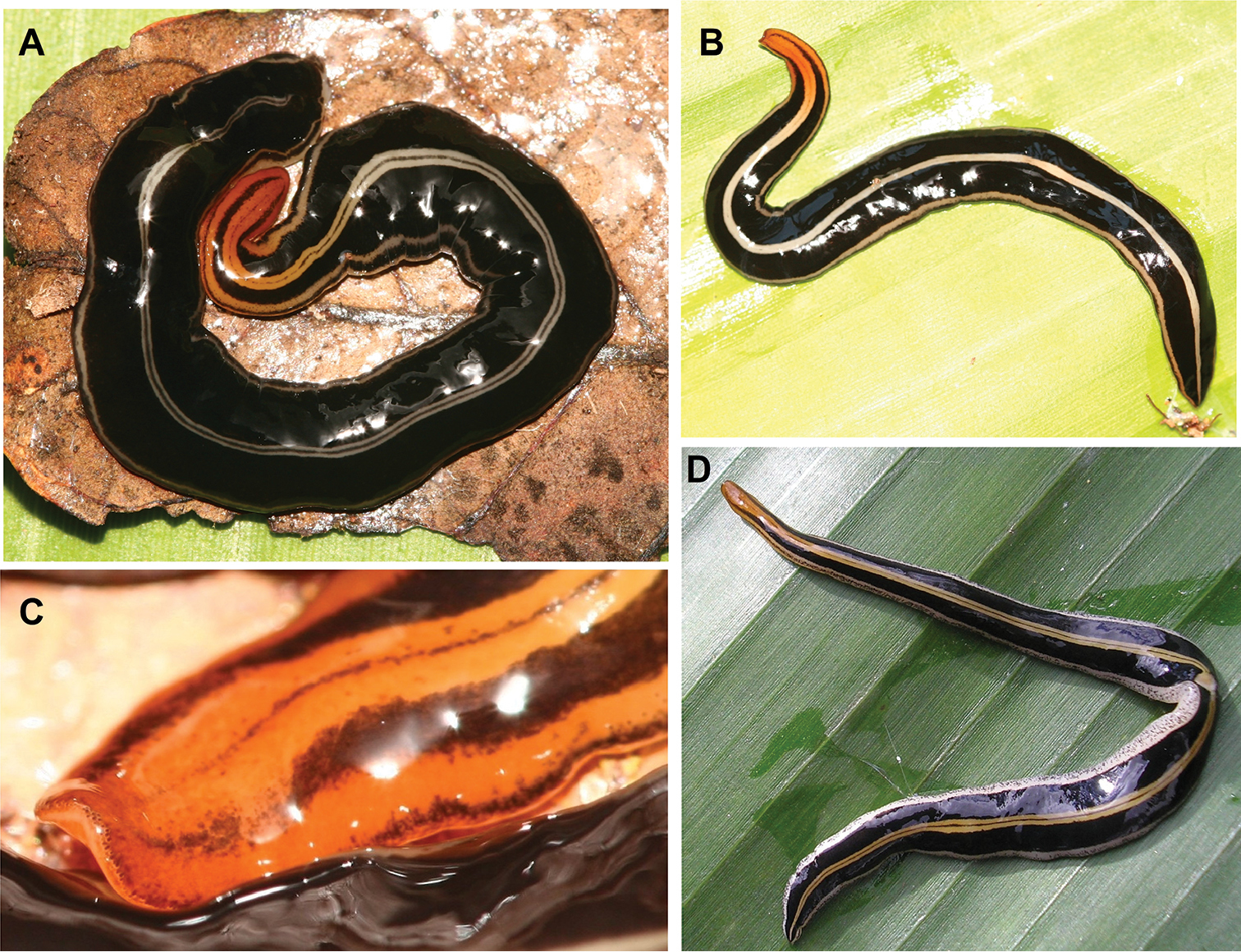

Scientific classification
- Kingdom: Animalia
- Phylum: Platyhelminthes
- Order: Tricladida
- Family: Geoplanidae
- Genus: Issoca
- Species: I. assanga

Binomial name
- Issoca assanga Araujo & Carbayo, 2018

= Issoca assanga =

Species of flatworm

Issoca assanga is a species of land planarian belonging to the subfamily Geoplaninae. It is known from specimens found in Brazil.

== Description ==
Issoca assanga is a flatworm that can reach up to 97 mm in length. The body is elongated with parallel margins; the front tip is rounded, while the back tip is pointed. The dorsal side of the body has a yellowish or cream-colored stripe running down the middle, which is divided by a discontinuous, tenuous thin black median line. The mid-stripe is bordered on each side by a black band, which is in turn bordered by a whitish stripe. The marginal zone either has a black stripe or mottled with black spots. The ventral side of the body is whitish. At the head region, the color of the body fades into orange, both dorsally and ventrally.

It can additionally be distinguished from other members of Issoca via its internal anatomy. Some cutaneous muscle bundles of the pre-pharyngeal region are sunk in. A feature that sets I. assanga apart from other members of Issoca is the fact that the cephalic retractor muscle and the sub-neural parenchymal muscle do not intersect; the intersection of such is a diagnostic feature of Issoca. Additionally, I. assanga has a long copulatory apparatus. The prostatic vesicle is extrabulbar, proximal, and lacking anastomoses. The ejaculatory duct is thin, with the opening at the tip of the penis papilla. The female atrium is spacious, with lateral folds; the common glandular duct is almost as long as the female atrium. A common muscle coat envelops both the female and male atria.

== Etymology ==
The specific epithet is derived from the Tupi language word assanga, meaning "dense, thick", in reference to the species' apparent cephalic glandulo-muscular organ.

== Distribution ==
Issoca assanga has been found within Brazil, in Desengano State Park and the Augusto Ruschi Biological Reserve.
