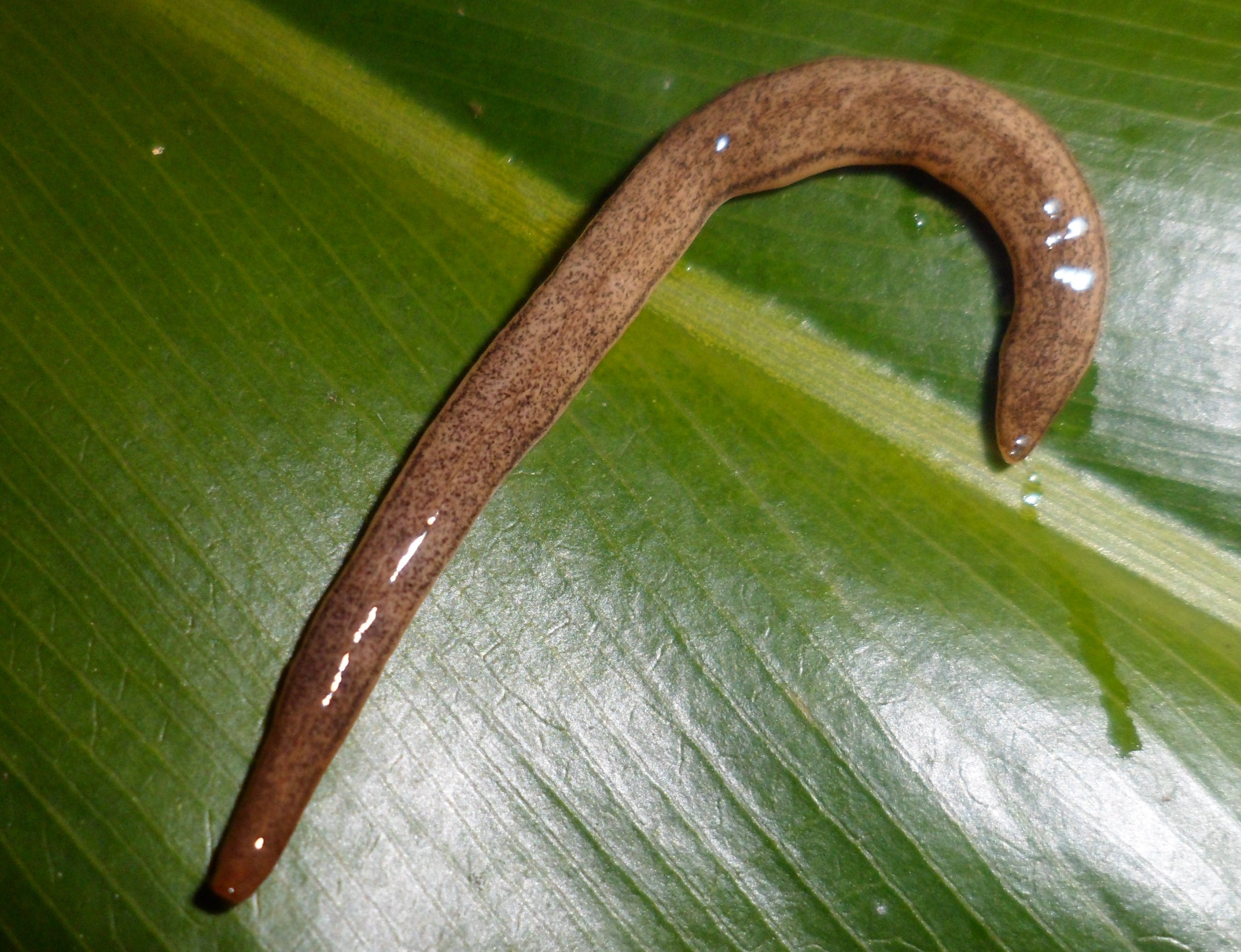
- Head at the bottom left

Scientific classification
- Kingdom: Animalia
- Phylum: Platyhelminthes
- Order: Tricladida
- Family: Geoplanidae
- Genus: Supramontana
- Species: S. irritata

Binomial name
- Supramontana irritata Carbayo & Leal-Zanchet, 2003

= Supramontana irritata =

Species of flatworm

Supramontana irritata is a species of Brazilian land planarian in the subfamily Geoplaninae. It is the type species of the genus Supramontana.

== Description ==
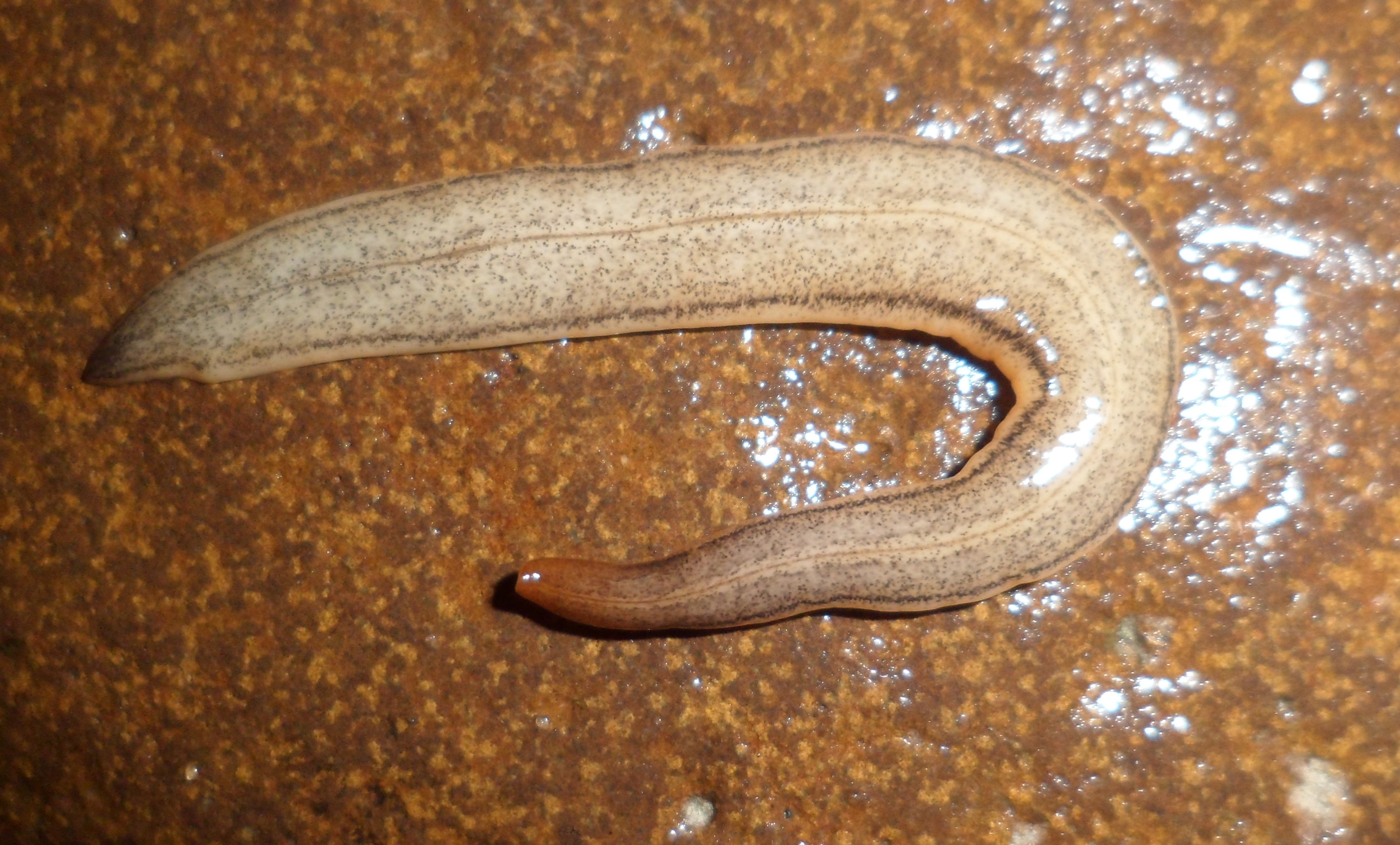
Dorsal view of Supramontana irritata

Supramontana irritata is a medium-sized land planarian up to 11 centimetres (4.3 in) in length when crawling. The dorsum has a light straw-yellow background color that is covered by very fine dark-brown to black spots. The spots form two wide diffuse lateral bands that become less marked towards the posterior end. The spots also concentrate at the margins of the bands, forming an irregular marginal stripe on each side of the body and two poorly marked paramedian stripes that run on each side of a thin median brown line. Sometimes the dark spots turn the median line inconspicuous, especially when the animal is contracted. The anterior end has an orange tinge that gradually fades posteriorly into the straw-yellow color of the dorsum. The ventral side is yellowish white.

The numerous eyes are very small and hardly visible to the naked eye. They are distributed marginally on the first millimeters of the body and posteriorly become dorsal, occupying about 20% of the body width on each side.

When crawling, S. irritata usually maintains the anterior end raised with the sides slightly curved downwards, giving it a U shaped in cross-section. In order to move forward, it usually stretches the anterior end, touches the substrate and contract the posterior region. If stimulated, it moves nervously and quickly, hence the name irritata (Latin for irritated).

== Distribution ==
The only known place of occurrence of S. irritata is the São Francisco de Paula National Forest in southern Brazil.
