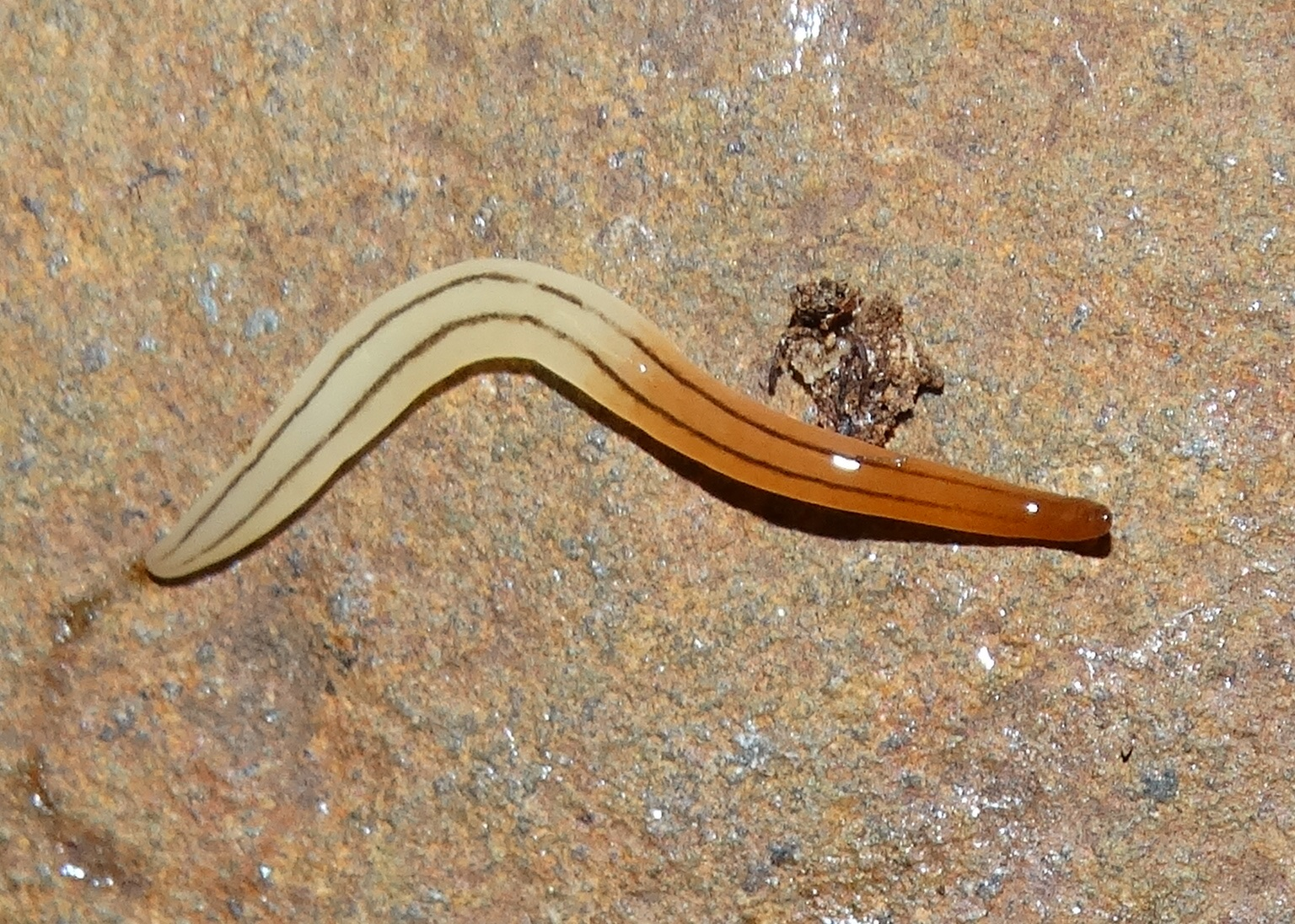
- Luteostriata subtilis

Scientific classification
- Kingdom: Animalia
- Phylum: Platyhelminthes
- Order: Tricladida
- Family: Geoplanidae
- Genus: Luteostriata
- Species: L. subtilis

Binomial name
- Luteostriata subtilis Boll, Amaral & Leal-Zanchet, 2019

= Luteostriata subtilis =

Species of flatworm

Luteostriata subtilis is a species of land planarian belonging to the subfamily Geoplaninae. It is known from specimens found in Brazil.

== Description ==
Luteostriata subtilis has an elongate body with parallel margins, reaching up to 62 mm in length. The dorsum is a light yellow color with two black lateral stripes. Under a stereomicroscope, three inconspicuous, discontinuous stripes can be seen: one median and two paramarginal. These are usually invisible to the naked eye. The ventral side of the body is a pale yellow color. The head region is an orange color that fades into the light yellow of the rest of the body.

The pharynx is bell-shaped, reaching about 5% of the body length. Below, rather than above, the opening of the ejaculatory duct, a large fold in the male atrium distinguishes the species from others in the genus.

== Etymology ==
The specific epithet of L. subtilis is derived from the Latin word subtilis (fine, slender, precise), in reference to the species' subtle, thin stripes on the dorsum, as well as the very subtle internal differences between it and L. ceciliae.

== Distribution ==
Luteostriata subtilis is only known from its type locality, which is the municipality of Cambará do Sul in Rio Grande do Sul, Brazil.
