= São Francisco de Paula, Rio Grande do Sul =

Municipality of Rio Grande do Sul, Brazil

São Francisco de Paula
- Municipality
- Municipality of São Francisco de Paula
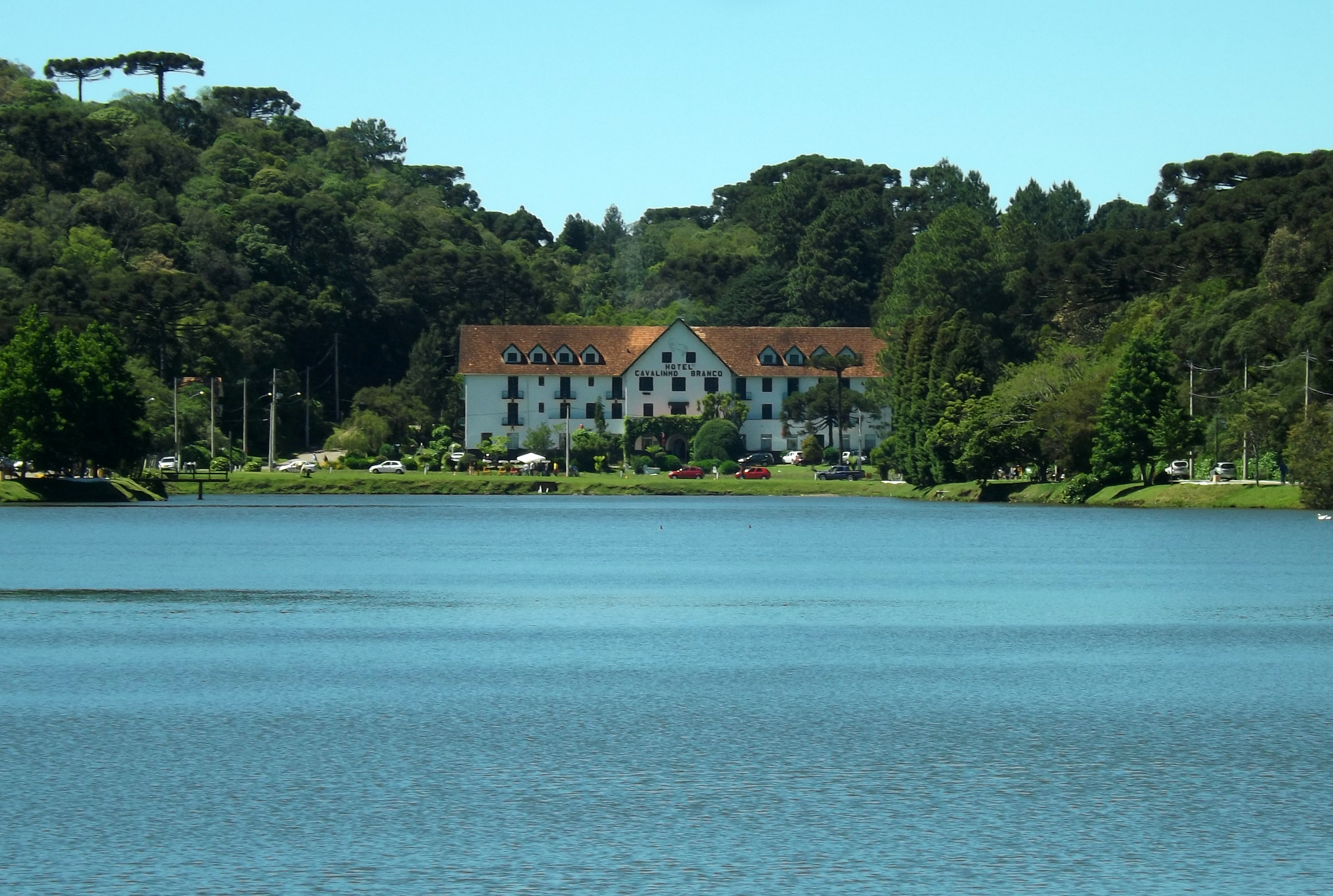
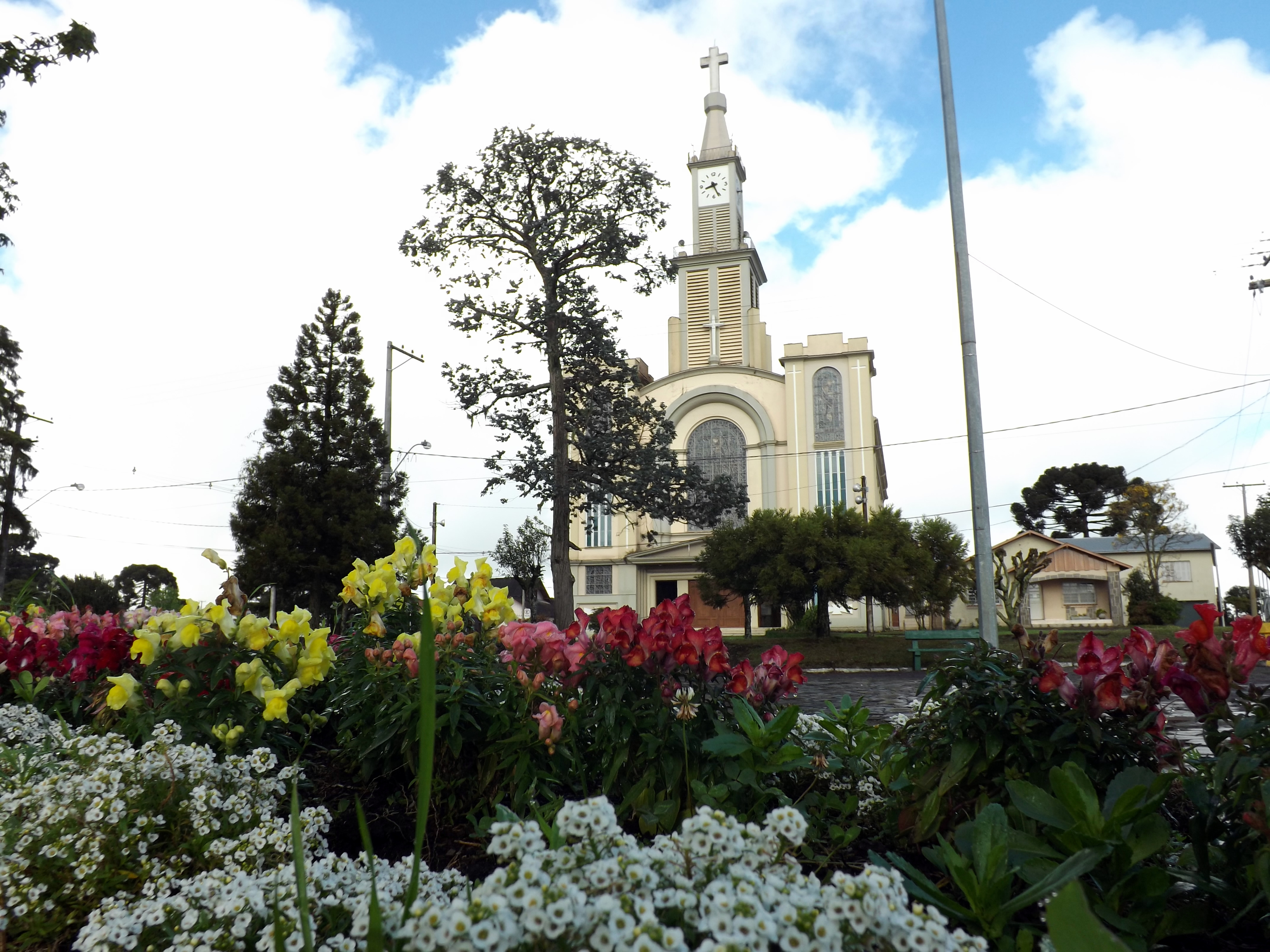
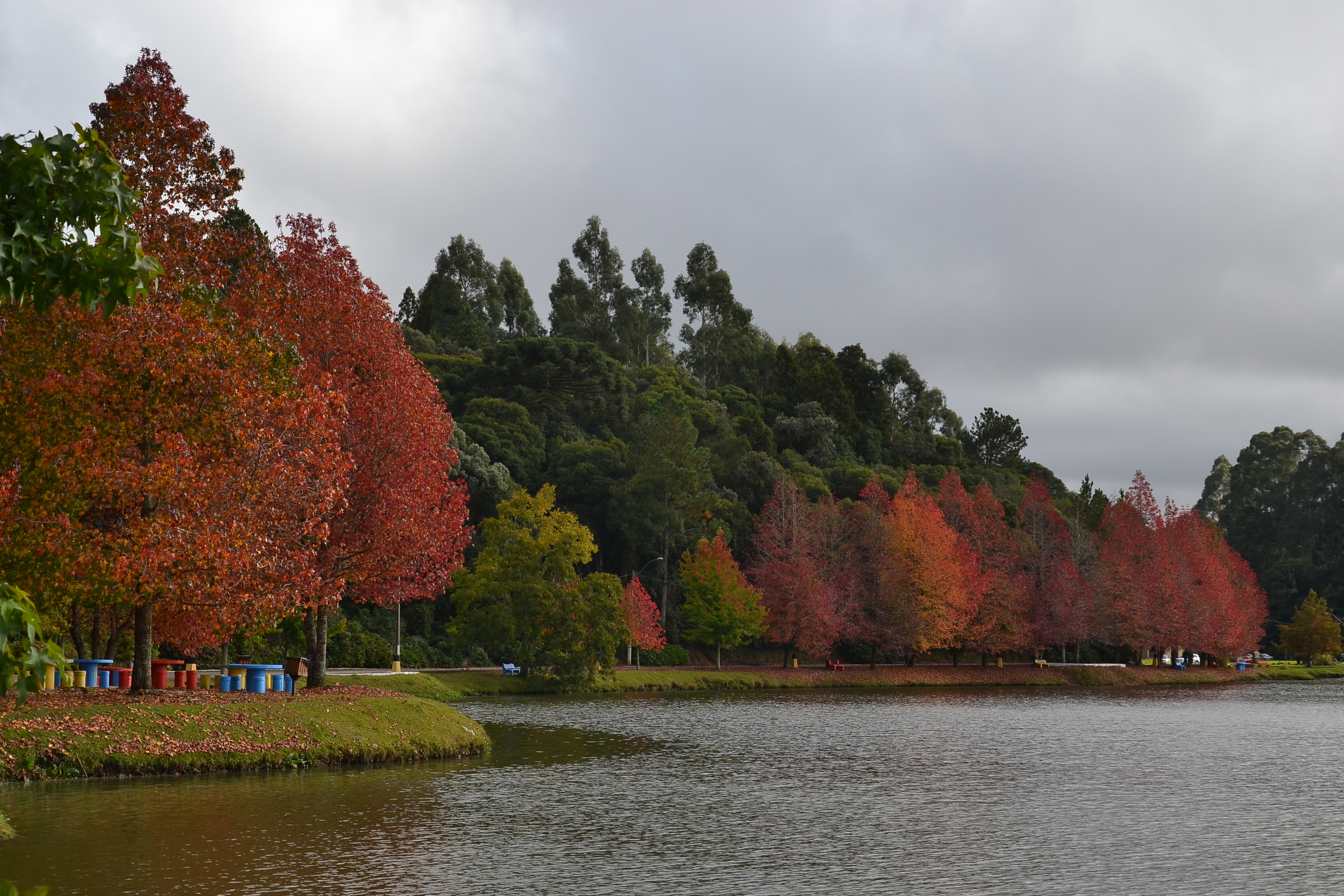
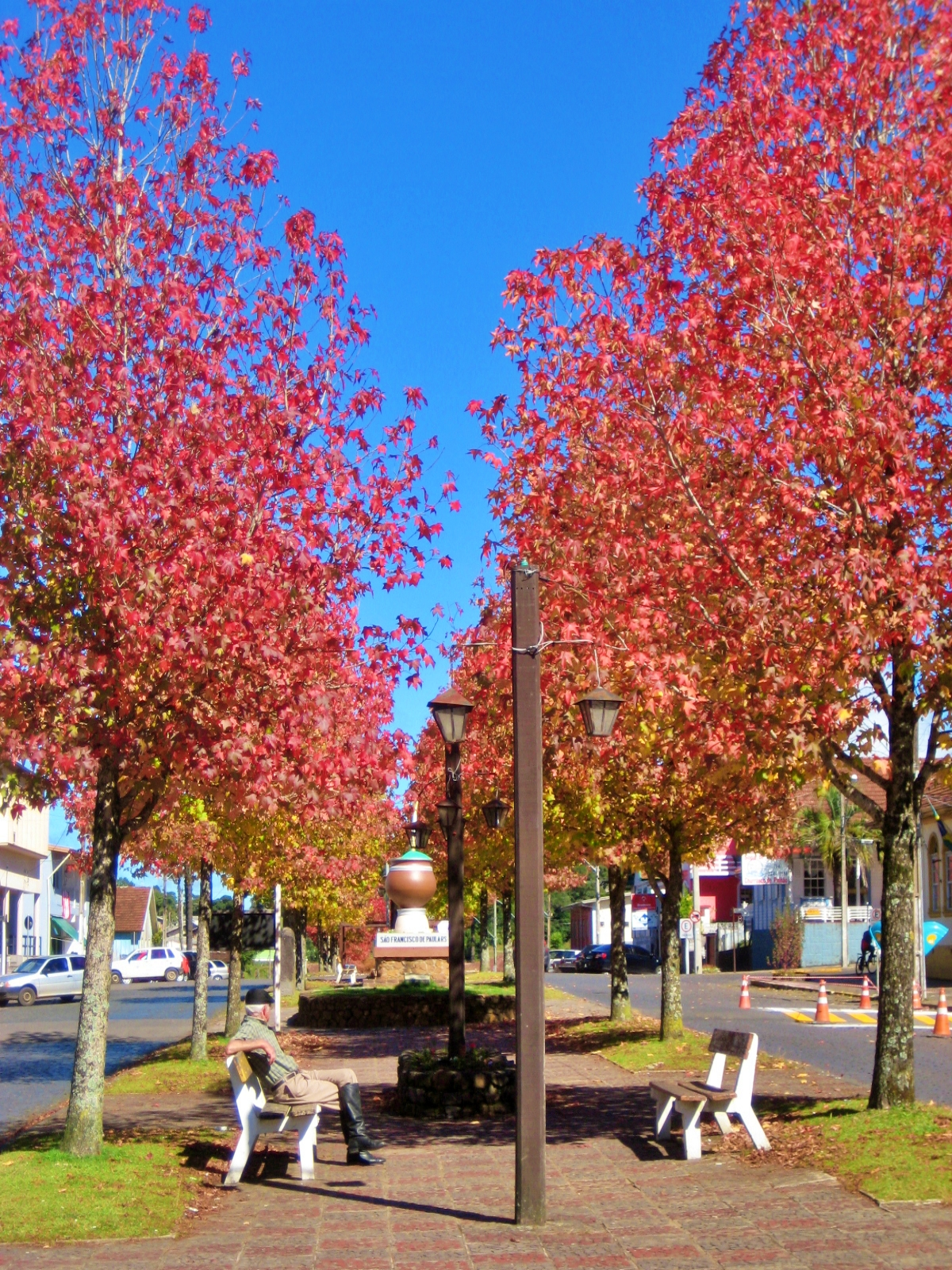
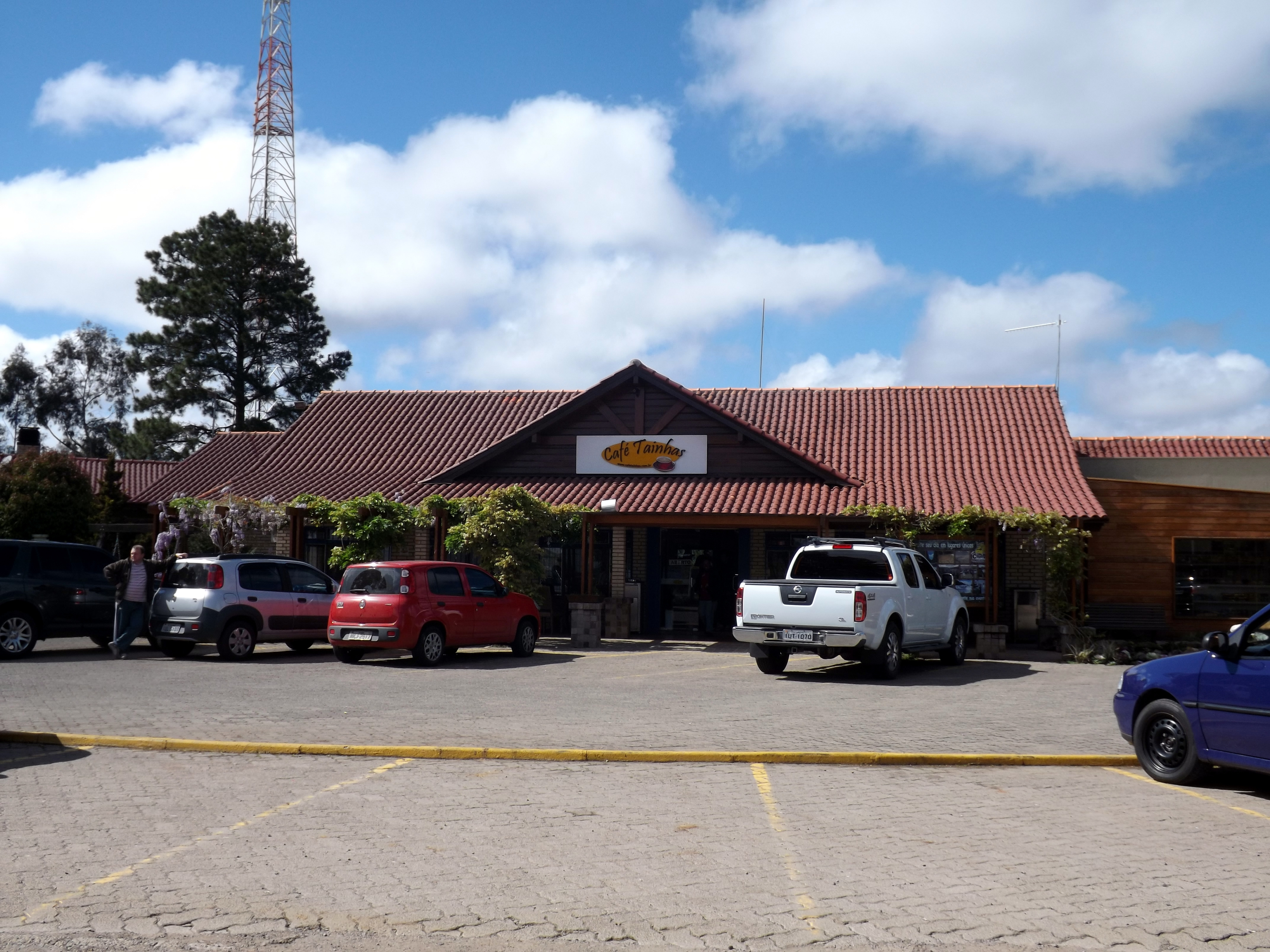
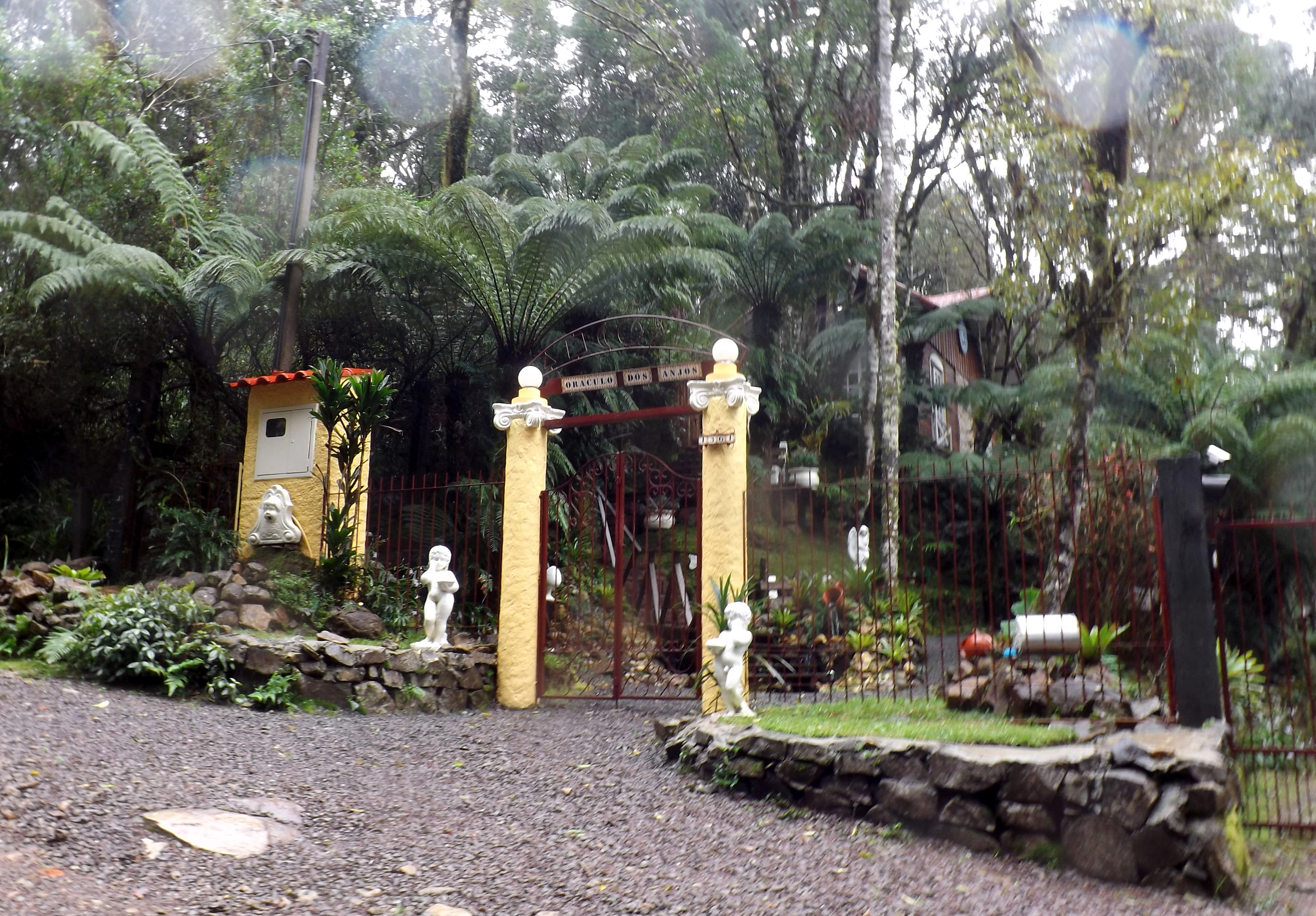
- São Bernardo Lake in São Chico

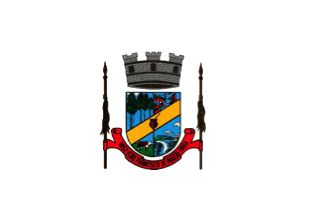
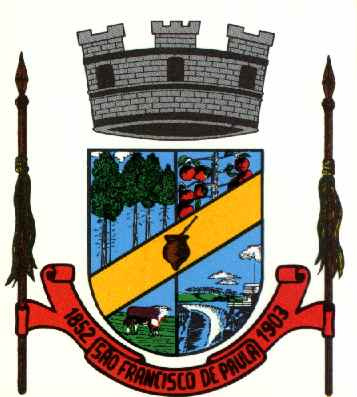
- Flag Coat of arms
- Nickname: São Chico
- Location in Rio Grande do Sul

- Location in Brazil
- Coordinates: 29°26′40″S 50°34′50″W
- Country: Brazil
- Region: South
- State: Rio Grande do Sul
- Founded: May 21, 1878

Government
  - Mayor: Antonio Juarez Hampel Schlichting (PTB)

Area
  - Total: 3,273.498 km^{2} (1,263.905 sq mi)
- Elevation: 907 m (2,976 ft)

Population (2020)
  - Total: 21,801
  - Density: 6.6598/km^{2} (17.249/sq mi)
- Time zone: UTC−3 (BRT)
- HDI (2010): 0.685 – medium
- Website: saofranciscodepaula.rs.gov.br

São Francisco de Paula is a city in the Serra Gaúcha of the state of Rio Grande do Sul, Brazil. The municipality covers about 3,289.7 km^{2} (1,270.2 sq mi) and sits about 112 km (70 mi) from Porto Alegre. As of 2020, the city's population was estimated to be 21,801. The municipality was originally created on December 23, 1902.

The city is a tourist destination and is a link along two official scenic tourist routes: the Região das Hortênsias and the Rota Romântica.

The municipality contains the São Francisco de Paula National Forest, a 1,616 hectares (3,990 acres) sustainable use conservation area created in 1968. It also contains part of the 6,655 hectares (16,440 acres) Tainhas State Park, created in 1975.

== Geography ==
=== Climate ===
São Francisco de Paula features a temperate oceanic climate (Köppen: Cfb), with mild summers and cool winters. Snowfalls may occur during winter between July and August. It is the wettest place in Rio Grande do Sul State with more than 2,100 millimetres (83 in) of rain precipitation per year.

Climate data for São Francisco de Paula (1961 - 2014)
Month	Jan	Feb	Mar	Apr	May	Jun	Jul	Aug	Sep	Oct	Nov	Dec	Year
Mean daily maximum °C (°F)	24.9 (76.8)	24.2 (75.6)	23.0 (73.4)	19.9 (67.8)	17.6 (63.7)	16.3 (61.3)	16.3 (61.3)	17.3 (63.1)	18.1 (64.6)	20.0 (68.0)	22.0 (71.6)	23.3 (73.9)	20.2 (68.4)
Daily mean °C (°F)	19.8 (67.6)	19.4 (66.9)	18.2 (64.8)	15.2 (59.4)	12.9 (55.2)	11.7 (53.1)	11.3 (52.3)	12.3 (54.1)	13.4 (56.1)	15.0 (59.0)	16.8 (62.2)	18.0 (64.4)	15.3 (59.5)
Mean daily minimum °C (°F)	14.8 (58.6)	14.7 (58.5)	13.5 (56.3)	10.5 (50.9)	8.3 (46.9)	7.1 (44.8)	6.4 (43.5)	7.4 (45.3)	8.7 (47.7)	10.1 (50.2)	11.6 (52.9)	12.7 (54.9)	10.5 (50.9)
Average precipitation mm (inches)	187.0 (7.36)	182.0 (7.17)	182.0 (7.17)	169.0 (6.65)	165.0 (6.50)	191.0 (7.52)	170.0 (6.69)	170.0 (6.69)	201.0 (7.91)	188.0 (7.40)	139.0 (5.47)	166.0 (6.54)	2,110 (83.07)
Source: Climate Data.

== Gallery ==
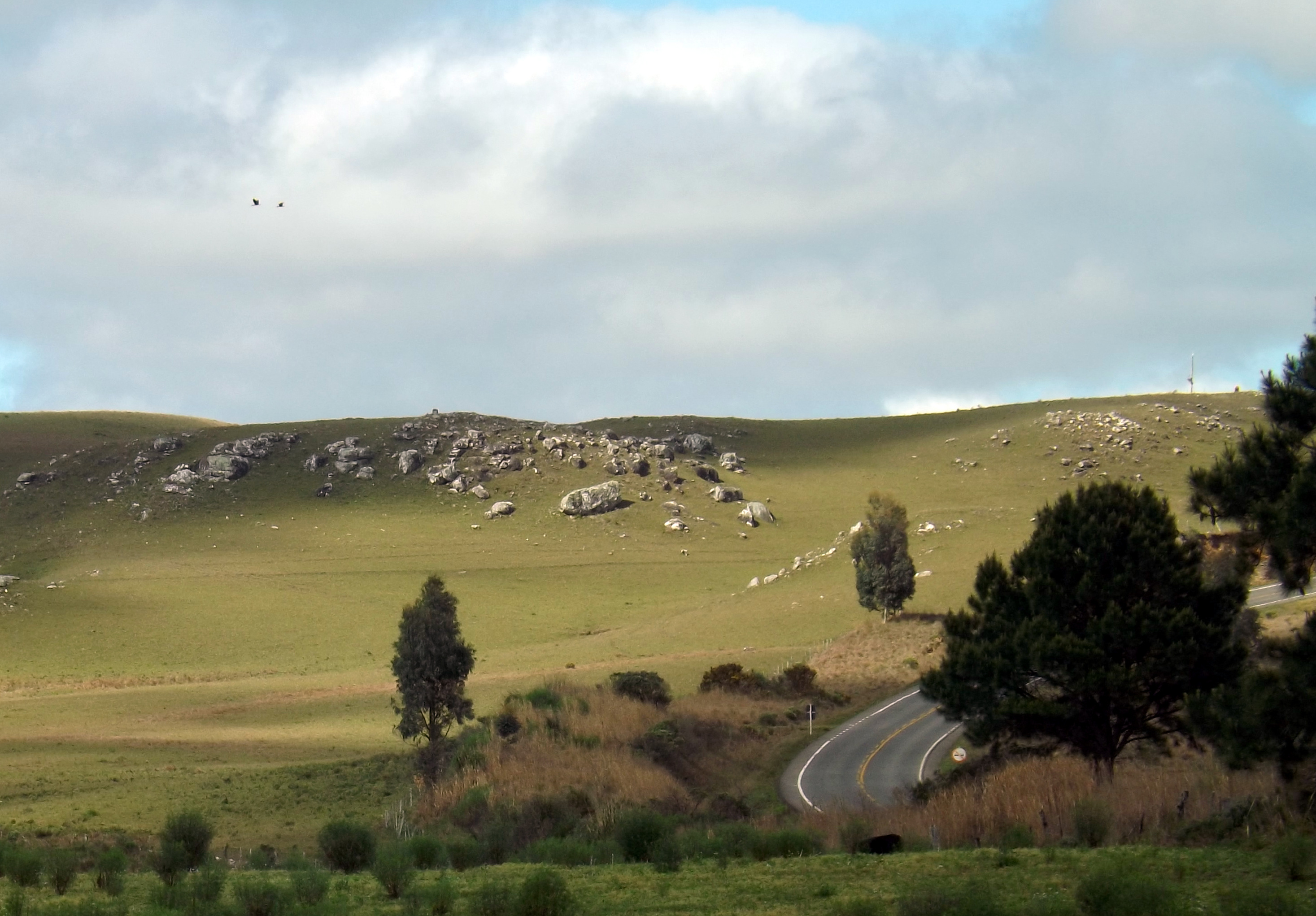
RS-020 Highway in São Francisco de Paula

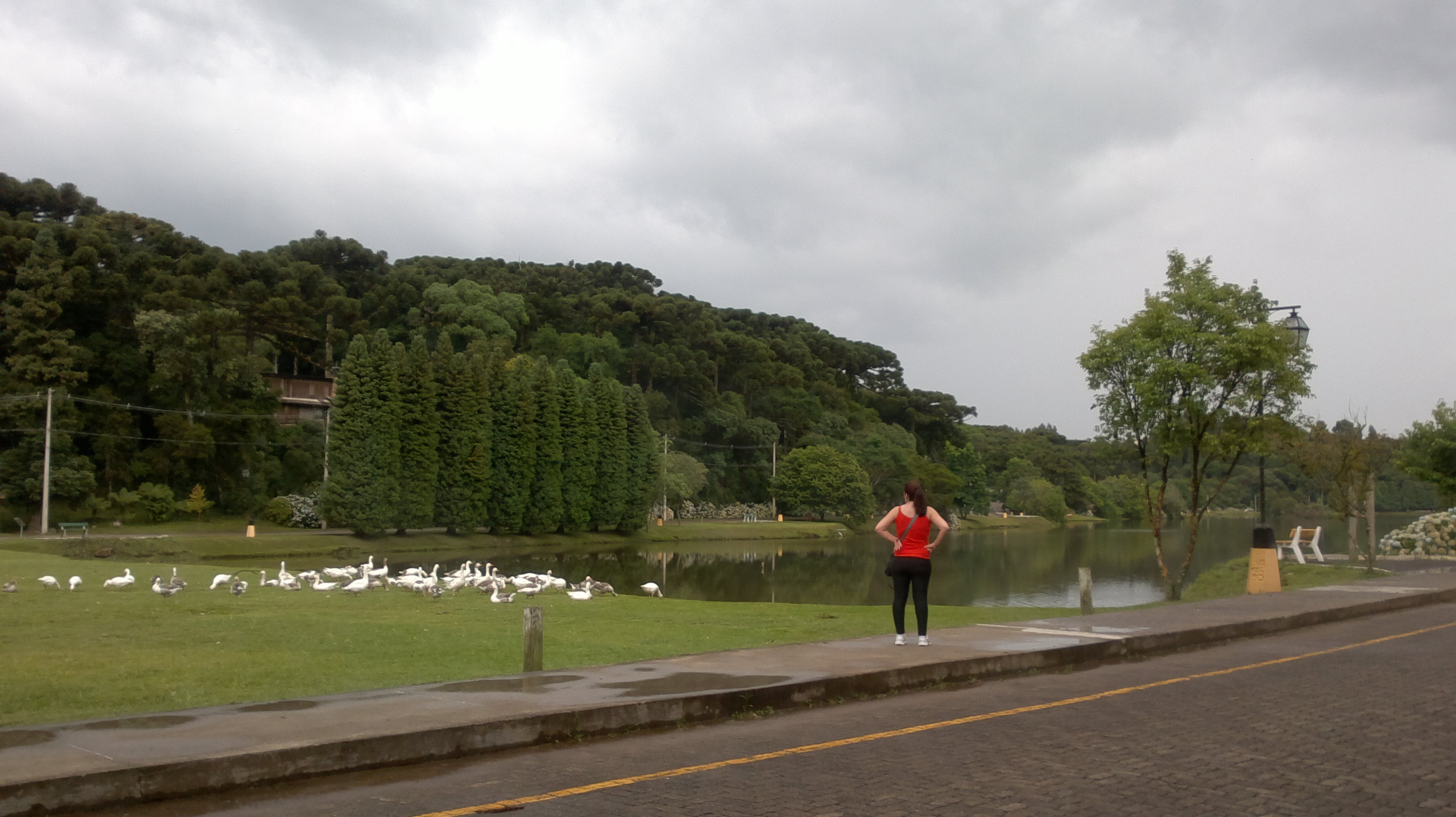
São Francisco de Paula

== See also ==
- List of municipalities in Rio Grande do Sul
