= Ernst Marcus (zoologist) =

German zoologist

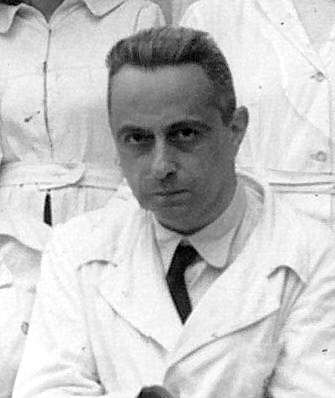
- Ernst Marcus in 1943
- Born: Ernst Gustav Gotthelf Marcus; 8 June 1893; Berlin
- Died: 30 June 1968 (aged 75)
- Citizenship: German, Brazilian
- Education: Berlin University
- Spouse: Eveline Du Bois-Reymond Marcus
- Scientific career
- Fields: Zoology, Bryozoology, Malacology
- Workplaces: University of São Paulo
- Doctoral students: Eudóxia Maria Froehlich, Claudio Gilberto Froehlich Walter Narchi
- Author abbrev. (zoology): Er. Marcus

Ernst Gustav Gotthelf Marcus (8 June 1893 – 30 June 1968) was a German zoologist, occupant of the chair of zoology at the University of São Paulo from 1936 to 1963, and co-founder of the Oceanographic Institute of the University of São Paulo.

== Life ==
Marcus was born in Berlin in a Jewish family, the son of Georg Marcus, a jurist, and Regina Schwartz. As a child, he lived near the Berlin Zoo, where he observed all kinds of animals, and collected beetles. He studied at the Kaiser Friedrich Gymnasium and later entered the Friedrich Wilhelm University to study zoology.

He began his doctoral studies in the Entomology Department at the Berlin Museum and, in 1914, he published his first zoological work. However, his studies were later delayed due to World War I, where he fought as a soldier, and his second work, a thesis on Coleoptera, was published only in 1919, when he received his doctorate. After graduation, he continued to work at the museum and was assigned to the Bryozoa collection. Without a resident specialist to teach him, he learned everything about the group on his own.

In 1923, Marcus obtained the 'Privat-Dozent', a credential that permitted him to teach at the university level. Thus, he became a professor at the Friedrich Wilhelm University. As an assistant to Karl Heider, Marcus became interested in Developmental Mechanics.

In 1924, aged 31, he married Eveline Du Bois-Reymond, granddaughter of Emil Du Bois-Reymond, and together they published several zoological works. In 1929, he was appointed Associate Professor at the Zoological Institute. That year, he published a monograph of the tardigrades, described by Hartmut Greven in 2018 as "comprehensive" and "unsurpassed today".

With the rise of Nazism in Germany, Marcus was dismissed as an assistant to Heider in 1935. In March 1936, he received a telegram from São Paulo offering him a professorship. This offer came due to the efforts of the Society for the Protection of Science and Learning, Ltd, a group that tried to find jobs for displaced Jewish scientist. Later that month, Marcus moved to Brazil with his wife, arriving on 1 April. He started to teach zoology at the University of São Paulo, occupying the chair that was vacant by the death of Professor Ernst Bresslau, and began studying the Brazilian bryozoan fauna.

With the start of World War II, Marcus was forbidden to go to the coast because of his German origins, making him turn his attention to freshwater bryozoans and other freshwater and terrestrial invertebrates, especially oligochaetes and turbellarians. In 1945, he became full professor of zoology and presented a large thesis about microturbellarians. After the war ended, Marcus was invited to go back to Germany, but he declined, saying that he was not willing to reconstruct his life a third time. Allowed to return to the coast, he continued to work on bryozoans, but focused more on turbellarians and later on opisthobranchs.

With Eveline, Marcus published 162 papers between 1936 and 1968, the first ones in Portuguese. Later works were published in English and covered invertebrate groups such as flatworms, annelids, onychophorans, nemertines, phoronids, gastropods, and pycnogonids.

Marcus died in 1968, and his wife continued their research until her death.

== Selected works ==
- Marcus, Ernst (1920). "Notizen über einiges Material mariner Bryozoen des Berliner Zoologischen Museums". Sitzungsberichte der Gesellschaft Naturforschender Freunde zu Berlin. 7: 255–284.
- Marcus, Ernst (1921). "Über die Verbreitung der Meeresbryozoen". Zoologischer Anzeiger. 53 (9–10). Leipzig: 205–221.
- Marcus, Ernst (1923). "Hydrostatik bei Meeresbryozoen". Verhandlungen der Deutschen Zoologischen Gesellschaft. 29. Leipzig: 39–41.
- Marcus, Ernst (1924). "Zur vergleichenden Embryologie der Bryozoen". Mitteilungen aus dem Zoologischen Museum in Berlin. 11 (1): 157–166.
- Marcus, Ernst (1925). "Zum Polymorphismus der Bryozoen". Verhandlungen der Deutschen Zoologischen Gesellschaft. 30. Leipzig: 152–159.
- Marcus, Ernst (1927). "Zur Anatomie und Ökologie mariner Tardigraden" [On Anatomy and Ecology of Underwater Tardigrades]. Zoologische Jahrbücher, Abteilung für Systematik (in German). 53: 487–558.
- Marcus, Ernst (1929). "Tardigrada". In Dahl, F. (ed.). Bronns Klassen und Ordnungen des Tierreichs. Vol. 5. Leipzig: Akademische Verlagsgesellschaft.
- Marcus, Ernst (1936). "Sobre alguns phenomenos da vida dos Bryozoarios Marinhos". Arquivos do Instituto Biológico, São Paulo. 7: 207–208.
- Marcus, Ernst (1937–1939). "Bryozoarios marinhos brasileiros". Boletim da Faculdade de Filosofia, Ciências e Letras da Universidade de São Paulo. Série Zoologia. 1–3.
- Marcus, Ernst (1945). "Sobre Catenulida Brasileiros". Boletim da Faculdade de Filosofia, Ciências e Letras da Universidade de São Paulo. Série Zoologia. 10: 3–133.
- Marcus, Ernst (1947–1952). "Turbellaria Brasileiros". Boletim da Faculdade de Filosofia, Ciências e Letras da Universidade de São Paulo. Série Zoologia. 12–17.
- Marcus, Ernst (1955). "Opisthobranchia from Brazil". Boletim da Faculdade de Filosofia, Ciências e Letras da Universidade de São Paulo. Série Zoologia. 20: 89–261.

== Species named in his honour ==
Several species have been named after Ernst Marcus, such as the land planarians Luteostriata ernesti and Imbira marcusi.
