= Claudio Gilberto Froehlich =

Brazilian zoologist and academic

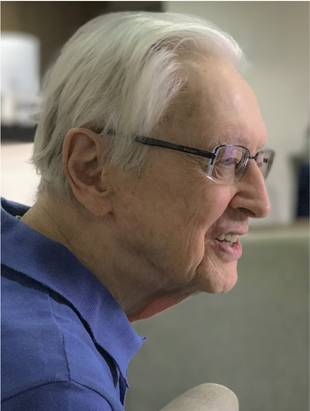
- Claudio Gilberto Froehlich in 2017
- Born: Claudio Gilberto Froehlich; 10 June 1927; São Paulo, Brazil
- Died: 27 November 2023 (aged 96); Ribeirão Preto, Brazil
- Scientific career
- Fields: Zoology, Helminthology, Entomology
- Workplaces: Universidade de São Paulo
- Doctoral advisor: Ernst Marcus
- Author abbrev. (zoology): Froehlich C. G. Froehlich

Claudio Gilberto Froehlich (10 June 1927 – 27 November 2023) was a Brazilian zoologist.

== Life ==
Froehlich was born in 1927 in São Paulo, Brazil. In 1951 he started his doctoral studies at the Universidade de São Paulo together with Eudóxia Maria de Oliveira Pinto, who later would become his wife. They both had Ernst Marcus as their advisor. Marcus suggested that they should work on the taxonomy of land planarians since it was a poorly studied but highly diverse group in the region. Later, in 1960, he received his post-doctoral degree from Lund University.

After his first academic years studying land planarians, Froehlich started to work with freshwater invertebrates, especially stoneflies.

== Homages ==
The beetle genus Claudiella Reichard & Vanin, 1976 and the stonefly genus Claudioperla Illies, 1963 were named after him.

== Selected works ==
- Froehlich, Claudio G. (1955). "Notas sobre geoplanas brasileiras". Papéis Avulsos de Zoologia. 12 (7): 198.
- Froehlich, Claudio G. (1955). "Sobre morfologia e taxonomia das Geoplanidae". Zoologia, São Paulo. 19: 195–279.
- Froehlich, Claudio G. (1955). "On the biology of land planarians". Boletim da Faculdade de Filosofia, Ciências e Letras da Universidade de São Paulo, Série Zoologia. 20 (20): 263–271. doi:10.11606/issn.2526-3382.bffclzoologia.1955.120214.
- Froehlich, Claudio G. (1956). "Turbellaria Terricola das regiões de Teresópolis e Ubatuba". Papéis Avulsos de Zoologia. 12 (16): 313–344.
- Froehlich, Claudio G. (1956). "Planárias Terrestres do Paraná". Dusenia. 7 (4): 173–191.
- Brinck, P.; Froehlich, Claudio G. (1960). "On The Stonefly Fauna Of Western Lule Lappmark, Swedish Lappland". Kungl. Fys. Sallsk., Lund Forhandl. 30 (1): 1–19.
- Froehlich, Claudio G. (1963). "A Peripatus From Barbados". Boletim da Faculdade de Filosofia, Ciências e Letras da Universidade de São Paulo, Série Zoologia. 24 (24): 325–333. doi:10.11606/issn.2526-3382.bffclzoologia.1962.120594.
- Froehlich, Claudio G. (1968). "On some Brazilian Onychophores". Beiträge zur Neotropischen Fauna. 5 (3): 160–171. doi:10.1080/01650526809360404. ISSN 0005-8130.
- Froehlich, Claudio (1969). "Caenis cuniana sp. n., a Parthenogenetic Mayfly". Studies on Neotropical Fauna and Environment. 6 (2): 103–108. doi:10.1080/01650526909360420. ISSN 0165-0521.
- Froehlich, Claudio G. (1969). "Studies on Brazilian Plecoptera 1. Some Gripopterygidae from the biological station at Paranapiacaba, state of Sao Paulo". Beiträge zur Neotropischen Fauna. 6 (1): 17–39. doi:10.1080/01650526909360412. ISSN 0005-8130.
- Froehlich, Claudio G. (2008). "Brazilian Plecoptera 2. Species of the serrana‐group of Kempnyia (Plecoptera)". Aquatic Insects. 6 (3): 137–147. doi:10.1080/01650428409361176. ISSN 0165-0424.
- Froehlich, Claudio G. (1984). "Brazilian Plecoptera 3. Macrogynoplax veneranda sp. n. (Perlidae : Acroneuriinae)". Annales de Limnologie. 20 (1–2): 39–41. doi:10.1051/limn/1984016. ISSN 0003-4088.
- Froehlich, Claudio G. (1984). "Brazilian Plecoptera 4. Nymphs of perlid genera from south-eastern Brazil". Annales de Limnologie. 20 (1–2): 43–47. doi:10.1051/limn/1984018. ISSN 0003-4088.
- Froehlich, Claudio G. (1988). "Brazilian Plecoptera 5. Old and new species of Kempnyia (Perlidae)". Aquatic Insects. 10 (3): 153–170. doi:10.1080/01650428809361324. ISSN 0165-0424.
- Froehlich, Claudio G. (1990). "Brazilian Plecoptera 6. Gripopteryx from Campos do Jordão, State of São Paulo (Gripopterygidae)". Studies on Neotropical Fauna and Environment. 25 (4): 235–247. doi:10.1080/01650529009360823. ISSN 0165-0521.
- Froehlich, Claudio G. (1993). "Brazilian Plecoptera 7. Old and new species of Gripopteryx (Gripopterygidae)". Aquatic Insects. 15 (1): 21–38. doi:10.1080/01650429309361496. ISSN 0165-0424.
- Froehlich, Claudio G. (1994). "Brazilian Plecoptera 8. On Paragripopteryx (Gripopterygidae)". Aquatic Insects. 16 (4): 227–239. doi:10.1080/01650429409361559. ISSN 0165-0424.
- Froehlich, Claudio G. (1998). "Seven New Species of Tupiperla (Plecoptera: Gripopterygidae) from Brazil, With a Revision of the Genus". Studies on Neotropical Fauna and Environment. 33 (1): 19–36. doi:10.1076/snfe.33.1.19.2170. ISSN 0165-0521.
- Froehlich, Claudio G. (1999). "Biometric notes on Tupiperla Froehlich (Plecoptera, Gripopterygidae)". Revista Brasileira de Zoologia. 16: 181–183. doi:10.1590/S0101-81751999000600018. ISSN 0101-8175.
- Froehlich, C. G. (2000). "Biological observations on Tupiperla (Plecoptera: Gripopterygidae)" (PDF). Revista Brasileira de Biologia. 60 (3): 447–450. doi:10.1590/S0034-71082000000300009. ISSN 0034-7108. PMID 11188870.
- Froehlich, Claudio G. (2002). "Two New Species of Tupiperla (Plecoptera: Gripopterygidae) from the Missions Area of Argentina and Paraguay". Aquatic Insects. 24 (1): 37–40. doi:10.1076/aqin.24.1.37.4906. ISSN 0165-0424. S2CID 84820499.
- Froehlich, Claudio G. (2003). "Stoneflies (Plecoptera: Perlidae) from the Brazilian Amazonia with the description of three new species and a key to Macrogynoplax". Studies on Neotropical Fauna and Environment. 38 (2): 129–134. doi:10.1076/snfe.38.2.129.15929. ISSN 0165-0521. S2CID 86445880.
- Froehlich, Claudio G. (2004). "Anacroneuria (Plecoptera: Perlidae) from the Boracéia Biological Station, São Paulo State, Brazil". Aquatic Insects. 26 (1): 53–63. doi:10.1076/aqin.26.1.53.35377. ISSN 0165-0424. S2CID 86499512.
- Froehlich, Claudio G. (2011). "Kempnyia (Plecoptera) from the Mantiqueira Mountains of Brazil" (PDF). Zootaxa. 2999: 20–32. doi:10.11646/zootaxa.2999.1.2.
- Froehlich, Claudio G. (2016). "Tupiperla (Plecoptera: Gripopterygidae) from southwestern Minas Gerais State, Brazil, with the description of Tupiperla amorimi n.sp". Zootaxa. 4103 (2): 174–176. doi:10.11646/zootaxa.4103.2.7. ISSN 1175-5334. PMID 27394627.
