= Ludwig von Graff =

Austrian zoologist

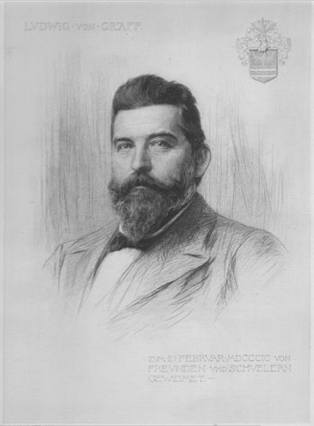
- Ludwig von Graff
- Born: Ludwig Bartholomäus Graff; January 2, 1851; Pancsova, Austrian Empire
- Died: February 6, 1924 (aged 73); Graz, Austria
- Scientific career
- Fields: Zoology, Helminthology
- Workplaces: University of Graz
- Author abbrev. (zoology): Graff; von Graff

Ludwig Graff de Pancsova (2 January 1851 – 6 February 1924), known as Ludwig von Graff, was an Austrian zoologist born in Pancsova.

In 1871, he received his medical degree in Vienna, afterwards studying zoology at the University of Graz. In 1872, he was an assistant at the zoological institute in Strasbourg, where he worked closely with Eduard Oscar Schmidt (1823–1886). In 1873, he relocated to Munich as an assistant to Karl Theodor Ernst von Siebold (1804–1885), gaining his habilitation during the following year. In 1876, he became a professor at the Academy of Forestry in Aschaffenburg, and from 1884 was a professor of zoology at the University of Graz. Here, he expanded the institute of zoology and its library. In 1896–97, he was rector of the university.

Graff was a leading expert on Turbellaria (flatworms), especially remembered for research of its morphology and biological systematics. He gathered material for his studies on numerous expeditions, which included journeys to Ceylon and Java (1893–94), the Arctic Ocean (1902), and North America (1907).

With Victor von Ebner (1842–1925) and others, he founded the Gesellschaft für Morphologie und Physiologie (1907). He was also a co-founder of the Deutschen Zoologischen Gesellschaft. The 1910 International Congress of Zoologists at Graz elected him an honorary president

== Selected writings ==
- Monographie der Turbellarien (Wien 1882, 1889); (Monograph of Turbellaria)
- Die Turbellarien als Parasiten und Wirte (Graz 1903); (Turbellaria as parasites and hosts)
- Das Schmarotzertum im Tierreich und seine Bedeutung für die Artbildung (Graz 1907); (Parasitism in animals and its importance for speciation).
