= Robert E. Ogren =

American zoologist

- Born: February 9, 1922; Jamestown, New York
- Died: July 13, 2005 (aged 83); Chautauqua, New York
- Scientific career
- Fields: Zoology, Parasitology, Helminthology
- Workplaces: Wilkes University
- Author abbrev. (zoology): Ogren

Robert Edward Ogren (February 9, 1922 – July 13, 2005) was an American zoologist.

== Life ==
Ogren was born in 1922 in Jamestown, New York, son of David Paul and Mary Gladys (born Ahlstrom) Ogren. While in secondary school, he developed a strong interest in natural history and started to study microscopic biology at home.

He earned a bachelor's degree in Zoology in 1947 from Wheaton College and a master's degree from Northwestern University in 1948. He married his wife, Jean Blose Jackson, on 28 August 1948, and their first son, Paul Robert Ogren, was born on 24 June 1949.

In 1953 he received a Ph.D. degree in Zoology and Physiology from the University of Illinois. His doctoral thesis was entitled "Concepts of Early Tapeworm Development Derived From Comparative Embryology of Oncospheres".

He began his academic career in 1953 as an assistant professor of biology at Ursinus College, remaining until 1957. During this time he had his second son, Philip Edward Ogren, born in 1955.

From 1957 to 1963, he worked also as an assistant professor of biology at Dickinson College, acting as chairman of the biology department from 1959 to 1960. In 1963 he moved to Wilkes College (currently Wilkes University) as an associate professor of biology, becoming full professor in 1981 and an emeritus professor in 1986. During his tenure, he developed basic research in the development of tapeworm hexacanth embryos. From 1980 on he also started to work on the biology of land planarians.

In 1987 he began a series of publications in association with Dr. Masaharu Kawakatsu entitled the "Land Planarian Indices Series" where they reviewed the taxonomy of all land planarian species known at the time.

He died in his sleep on 13 July 2005 while on vacation at the Chautauqua Institution, New York.

== Selected works ==
- Ogren, Robert E. (1956). "Development and Morphology of the Oncosphere of Mesocestoides corti, a Tapeworm of Mammals". The Journal of Parasitology. 42 (4): 414–428. doi:10.2307/3274524. ISSN 0022-3395. JSTOR 3274524. PMID 13346431.
- Ogren, Robert E. (1955). "Ecological Observations on the Occurrence of Rhynchodemus, a Terrestrial Turbellarian". Transactions of the American Microscopical Society. 74 (1): 54–60. doi:10.2307/3223842. ISSN 0003-0023. JSTOR 3223842.
- Ogren, Robert E. (1956). "Physiological observations on movement and behavior of the land planarian Rhynchodemus sylvaticus (Leidy)". Proceedings of the Pennsylvania Academy of Science. 30: 218–225.
- Ogren, Robert E. (1957). "Morphology and Development of Oncospheres of the Cestode Oochoristica symmetrica Baylis, 1927". The Journal of Parasitology. 43 (5): 505–520. doi:10.2307/3274469. ISSN 0022-3395. JSTOR 3274469. PMID 13476299.
- Ogren, Robert E. (1957). "Developmental observations, the egg capsule and sexual maturity of the land planarian Rhynchodemus sylvaticus". Transactions of the American Microscopical Society. 76 (1): 42–57. doi:10.2307/3223919. JSTOR 3223919.
- Ogren, Robert E. (1982). "The identification and reproductive apparatus of the land planarian, Microplana atrocyaneus (Walton) from Pennsylvania (Platyhelminthes: Turbellaria)". Proceedings of the Pennsylvania Academy of Science. 56: 39–43.
- Ogren, Robert E. (1983). "Reproductive complex and sexual maturity of the land planarian, Rhynchodemus sylvaticus (Leidy) in the United States". Proceedings of the Pennsylvania Academy of Science. 57: 69–73.
- Ogren, Robert E. (1984). "The Land Planarian Microplana terrestris (Platyhelminthes: Turbellaria) from the United States". Transactions of the American Microscopical Society. 103 (2): 130–136. doi:10.2307/3226235. JSTOR 3226235.
- Ogren, Robert E. (1986). "Development of the reproductive apparatus of the land planarian Rhynchodemus sylvaticus (Turbellaria: Tricladida) and its significance for classification in the genus". Hydrobiologia. 132 (1): 175–180. Bibcode:1986HyBio.132..175O. doi:10.1007/BF00046245. ISSN 0018-8158. S2CID 25774248.
- Ogren, Robert E.; Kawakatsu, Masaharu (1987). "Index to the species of the genus Bipalium (Turbellaria, Tricladida, Terricola)". The Bulletin of Fuji Women's College. Series 2. 25: 79–119.
- Ogren, Robert E.; Kawakatsu, Masaharu (1988). "Index to the species of the family Rhynchodemidae (Turbellaria, Tricladida, Terricola) Part I: Rhynchodeminae". The Bulletin of Fuji Women's College. Series 2. 26: 39–91.
- Ogren, Robert E.; Kawakatsu, Masaharu (1989). "Index to the species of the family Rhynchodemidae (Turbellaria, Tricladida, Terricola) Part II: Microplaninae". The Bulletin of Fuji Women's College. Series 2. 27: 53–111.
- Ogren, Robert E. (1989). "Identification Features of the Two-Lined Land Planarian Rhynchodemus sylvaticus, with Evidence That Rhynchodemus americanus Is Conspecific". Transactions of the American Microscopical Society. 108 (1): 40–44. doi:10.2307/3226204. ISSN 0003-0023. JSTOR 3226204.
- Ogren, Robert E.; Kawakatsu, Masaharu (1990). "Index to the species of the family Geoplanidae (Turbellaria, Tricladida, Terricola) Part I: Geoplaninae". The Bulletin of Fuji Women's College. Series 2. 28: 79–166.
- Ogren, Robert E.; Kawakatsu, Masaharu (1991). "Index to the species of the family Geoplanidae (Turbellaria, Tricladida, Terricola) Part II: Caenoplaninae and Pelmatoplaninae". The Bulletin of Fuji Women's College. Series 2. 29: 35–58.
- Ogren, Robert E. (1987). "Description of a New Three-Lined Land Planarian of the Genus Bipalium (Turbellaria: Tricladida) from Pennsylvania, U.S.A.". Transactions of the American Microscopical Society. 106 (1): 21–30. doi:10.2307/3226281. ISSN 0003-0023. JSTOR 3226281.
- Ogren, Robert E.; Darlington, Julian T. (1991). "Geoplana arkalabamensis n. sp., a Land Planarian from the Southern United States (Turbellaria: Tricladida: Geoplanidae)". Transactions of the American Microscopical Society. 110 (3): 226–236. doi:10.2307/3226657. ISSN 0003-0023. JSTOR 3226657.
- Ogren, Robert E. (1991). "Developmental sequence for the copulatory organs of Kontikia mexicana with remarks on taxonomic significance (Turbellaria: Tricladida: Geoplanidae)". Hydrobiologia. 227 (1): 139–144. Bibcode:1991HyBio.227..139O. doi:10.1007/BF00027593. ISSN 0018-8158. S2CID 37236077.
- Ogren, Robert E. (1991). "Land Planarians from Ontario and Quebec, Canada". Transactions of the American Microscopical Society. 110 (1): 27–36. doi:10.2307/3226737. ISSN 0003-0023. JSTOR 3226737.
- Oki, Iwashiro; Tamura, Sachiko; Ogren, Robert E.; Kawakatsu, Masaharu (1991). "Karyology of four land-planarian species of the genus Bipalium from Japan". Hydrobiologia. 227 (1): 163–167. Bibcode:1991HyBio.227..163O. doi:10.1007/BF00027597. ISSN 0018-8158. S2CID 12455334.
- Ogren, Robert E. (1995). "Predation behaviour of land planarians". Hydrobiologia. 305 (1–3): 105–111. Bibcode:1995HyBio.305..105O. doi:10.1007/BF00036370. ISSN 0018-8158. S2CID 31413150.
