= Eudóxia Maria Froehlich =

Brazilian zoologist

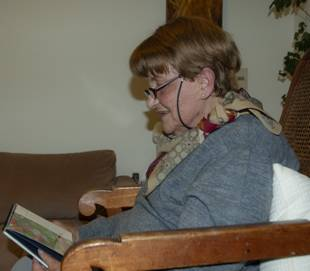
- Eudóxia Maria Froehlich in 2008
- Born: Eudóxia Maria de Oliveira Pinto; 21 October 1928; São Paulo, Brazil
- Died: 26 September 2015 (aged 86); São Paulo, Brazil
- Scientific career
- Fields: Zoology, Helminthology
- Workplaces: Universidade de São Paulo
- Doctoral advisor: Ernst Marcus
- Author abbrev. (zoology): Froehlich E. M. Froehlich

Eudóxia Maria Froehlich (21 October 1928 – 26 September 2015) was a Brazilian zoologist.

== Life ==
Born in 1928, Eudóxia Maria de Oliveira Pinto was the daughter of Alice Alves de Camargo and the ornithologist Olivério Mário de Oliveira Pinto. Since she was a child, her parents used to take her and her siblings to the wooded areas near São Paulo, which helped her to become interested in zoology, especially small animals.

After finishing High School, she spent six months in Rio de Janeiro with an uncle who was a physician and returned home interested in studying medicine. Her father did not approve the idea, considering it an inappropriate career for a woman, and suggested her to study natural history and so she did. During this time she became engaged to Claudio Gilberto Froehlich, one of her colleagues.

In 1951 she and Froehlich started their doctoral studies at the Universidade de São Paulo together, having Ernst Marcus as their advisor. Marcus suggested that they should work on the taxonomy of land planarians, since it was a poorly studied but highly diverse group in the region.

She continued her studies with land planarians until 1978 and then changed her attention to arachnids. She retired in 1988, but continued her work as an emerita professor, being active until her death in 2015.

== Homages ==
The land planarian genus Eudoxiatopoplana, as well as the species Obama eudoxiae, Obama eudoximariae and Notogynaphallia froehlichae, were named after her.

== Selected works ==
- Froehlich, Eudóxia Maria (1955). "Sobre Espécies Brasileiras do Gênero Geoplana". Bol Fac Filos Ciênc Let Univ São Paulo Sér Zool. 19 (19): 289–33. doi:10.11606/issn.2526-3382.bffclzoologia.1954.120096.
- Froehlich, Claudio Gilberto; Froehlich, Eudóxia Maria (1972). "Land planarians from the Amazonian region". Papéis Avulsos de Zoologia. 26 (2): 29–45.
- Froehlich, Eudóxia Maria (1978). "On a collection of Chilean landplanarians". Bol Zool Univ São Paulo. 3: 7–80.
- Froehlich, Eudóxia Maria; Leal-Zanchet, Ana Maria (2003). "A new species of terrestrial planarian of the genus Notogynaphallia Ogren & Kawakatsu (Platyhelminthes, Tricladida, Terricola) from south Brazil and some comments on the genus". Revista Brasileira de Zoologia. 20 (4): 745–753. doi:10.1590/S0101-81752003000400030. ISSN 0101-8175.
- Froehlich, Eudóxia Maria; Carbayo, Fernando (2011). "Catálogo dos "Turbellaria" (Platyhelminthes) do Estado de São Paulo". Biota Neotropica. 11: 503–514. doi:10.1590/S1676-06032011000500019. ISSN 1676-0603.
