= São Francisco de Paula National Forest =

- Floresta Nacional de São Francisco de Paula
- IUCN category VI (protected area with sustainable use of natural resources)
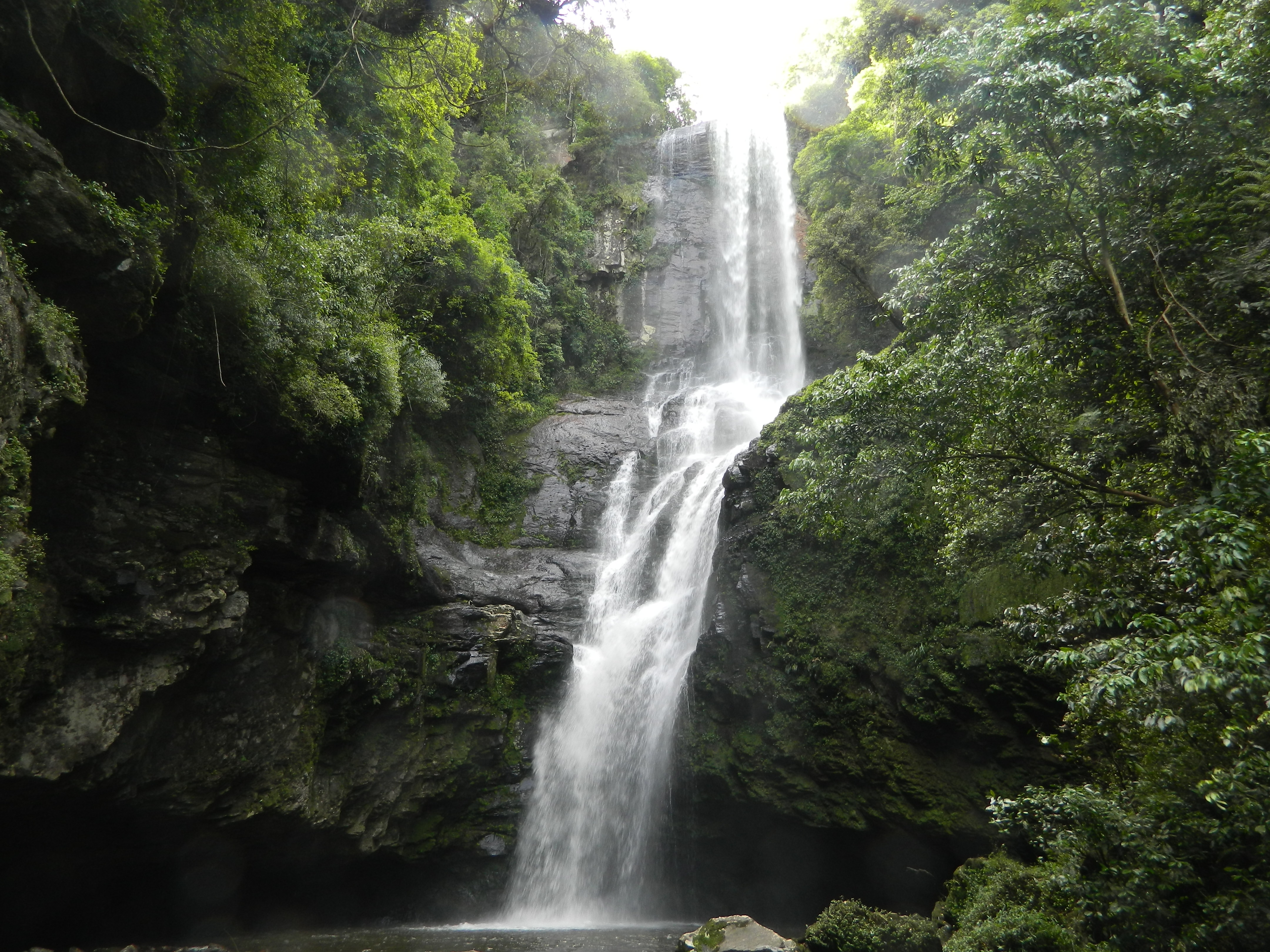

- Location within Brazil
- Nearest city: São Francisco de Paula
- Coordinates: 29°25′22″S 50°23′11″W
- Area: 1,615.59 hectares (3,992.2 acres)
- Designation: National forest
- Established: 1968
- Governing body: Chico Mendes Institute for Biodiversity Conservation

The São Francisco de Paula National Forest (Portuguese: Floresta Nacional de São Francisco de Paula) is a national forest in the state of Rio Grande do Sul, Brazil.

== Origins ==
Decree law 3.124 of 19 March 1941 created the National Pine Institute (Instituto Nacional do Pinho), a federal agency concerned with pine trees. Among its duties it created what would become the national forests of the south and south east of Brazil. By ordinance 561 of 25 October 1968 these became the forest parks of the National Pine Institute, and were classed as national forests under the Forest Code of 1965.

== Location ==
The São Francisco de Paula National Forest is in the Atlantic Forest biome. It has an area of 1,615.59 hectares (3,992.2 acres). It is located in the municipality of São Francisco de Paula, Rio Grande do Sul.

- Altitudes range from 630 to 922 metres (2,067 to 3,025 ft).
- Average annual rainfall is 2,468 millimetres (97.2 in).
- Average temperature is 15 °C (59 °F).

The National Pine Institute planted zones of reforestation with exotic species. Half the area is native Atlantic forest.

More than 20 endangered species of wildlife have been recorded in or around the forest, as well as threatened species of shrubs and trees. Besides Atlantic Forest species there are trees of Andean and Antarctic origin such as Drimys winteri and Araucaria angustifolia. There are two nature trails where visitors may be given scheduled tours by a guide, and five hostels for students and researchers with 50 beds in all. The forest preserves the sources of the Sinos River basin.

== Conservation ==
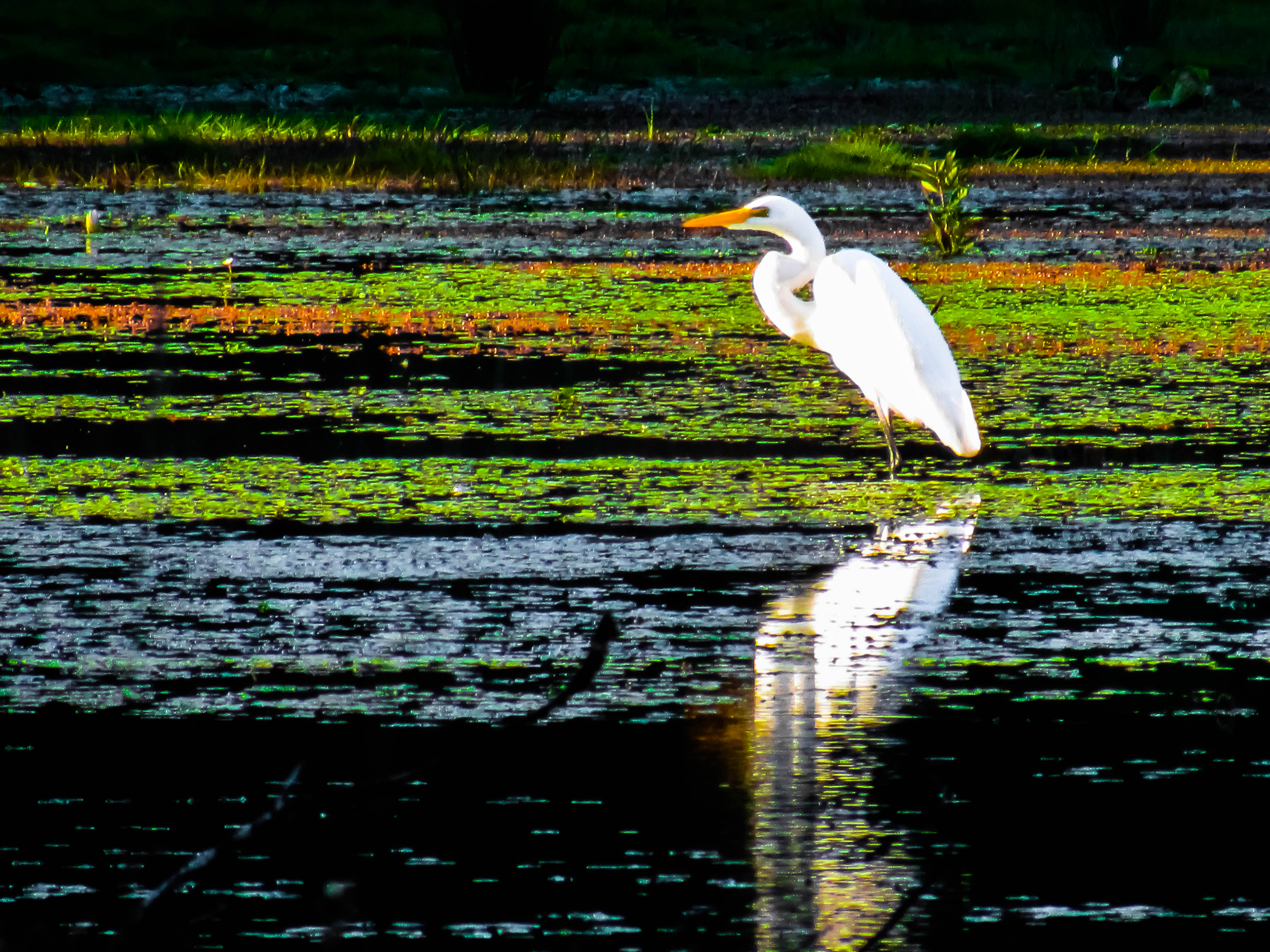
Great Egret (Ardea alba) in Brazil

The forest is classed IUCN protected area category VI (protected area with sustainable use of natural resources). The objectives are to support multiple forms of sustainable use of forest resources and scientific research, with emphasis on sustainable exploitation of native forests. The management plan allows for annual production of 10,000 mst (Note: 1 mst – metro estéreo – of wood is a stack of logs that would fit in a 1 metre (3 ft 3 in) cube. Depending on the species, it corresponds to one half to two thirds of a cubic metre of solid wood.) of wood, and also for sustainable harvesting non-wood products such as pine nuts.

The forest is part of the core area of the Atlantic Forest Biosphere Reserve. It is within the Sinos River ecological corridor between the Caí River and Tainhas River ecological corridors. The various existing or planned protected areas form an important arc and biodiversity corridor along the slopes of the plateau. Protected species in the forest include the maned wolf (Chrysocyon brachyurus), oncilla (Leopardus tigrinus), ocelot (Leopardus pardalis), cougar (Puma concolor), red myotis (Myotis ruber) bat, black-capped piprites (Piprites pileata), vinaceous-breasted amazon (Amazona vinacea), red-spectacled amazon (Amazona pretrei) and Chaco eagle (Buteogallus coronatus).

== Sources ==
- Flona de São Francisco de Paula (in Portuguese), Chico Mendes Institute for Biodiversity Conservation
- Unidade de Conservação: Floresta Nacional de São Francisco de Paula (in Portuguese), MMA: Ministério do Meio Ambiente
