= Ihering's Atlantic spiny rat =

Ihering's Atlantic spiny-rat

Conservation status
- Least Concern (IUCN 3.1)

Scientific classification
- Kingdom: Animalia
- Phylum: Chordata
- Class: Mammalia
- Order: Rodentia
- Family: Echimyidae
- Subfamily: Euryzygomatomyinae
- Genus: Trinomys
- Species: T. iheringi

Binomial name
- Trinomys iheringi (Thomas, 1911)

Synonyms
- Proechimys iheringi

Species of rodent

Ihering's Atlantic spiny-rat or Ihering's spiny rat (Trinomys iheringi) is a spiny rat species from Brazil.

== Taxonomy ==
It was first described by Oldfield Thomas in 1911, who placed it in Proechimys. It was named in honor of Hermann von Ihering, who collected the type specimen.

In 1948, João Moojen described six subspecies (bonafidei, denigratus, gratiosus, iheringi, panema, and paratus), though he was unhappy with his population sample and expected some of them may have been properly full species based on geographic isolation and physical differences. A seventh (eliasi) was described in 1992 by Reis et al. In 2000, Proechimys iheringi was moved to Trinomys by Lara and Patton, who also reclassified the former subspecies based on genetic analysis. Trinomys eliasi and T. paratus became separate species, as did T. gratiosus with bonafidei as a subspecies. dengiratus became a subspecies of T. setosus. The study was unable to examine any specimens of panema. As of 2025, the species has no named subspecies.

A 2016 analysis based on phenotypic traits found that it was most closely related to T. dimidatus, from which it diverged an estimated 6.5 million years ago.

== Description ==
Trinomys iheringi is a medium-sized rat, with an average head and body length of 191 millimetres (7.5 in) with a 171 millimetres (6.7 in) tail. They weigh about 209 grams (7.4 oz). The fur on the top of the body is "cinnamon-buff", which lightens to white on the stomach. The tail has a brown base and white tip. Like other spiny rats, the coat is mixed with long stiff furs, or spines, about 21 millimetres (0.83 in) in length along the back.

T. iheringi has 30 pairs of standard chromosomes, as well as a variable number of additional "dot-like" supernumerary chromosomes.

It is found in Atlantic rainforest in Brazil, near the coasts, in the states of Sao Paulo and Rio de Janeiro. The Rio de Janeiro population, located on the island of Ilha Grande, is genetically distinct, and may represent a separate species. The two populations diverged about 0.6 million years ago, possibly due to glacial cycling occurring at the time.

They have unusually large home ranges for rodents of their size, an average of 1.37 hectares (13,700 m^{2}) for males and 0.86 hectares (8,600 m^{2}) for females. The females reach full maturity at approximately eight months, and the lifespan is up to 30 months. They can reproduce year-round, but more commonly do so during the rainy season. They are likely polygynous.

It is listed by the IUCN as a species of least concern due to its wide distribution and large population.
