= Oecomys sydandersoni =

Scientific classification
- Domain: Eukaryota
- Kingdom: Animalia
- Phylum: Chordata
- Class: Mammalia
- Order: Rodentia
- Family: Cricetidae
- Subfamily: Sigmodontinae
- Genus: Oecomys
- Species: O. sydandersoni

Binomial name
- Oecomys sydandersoni Carleton, Emmons, & Musser, 2009
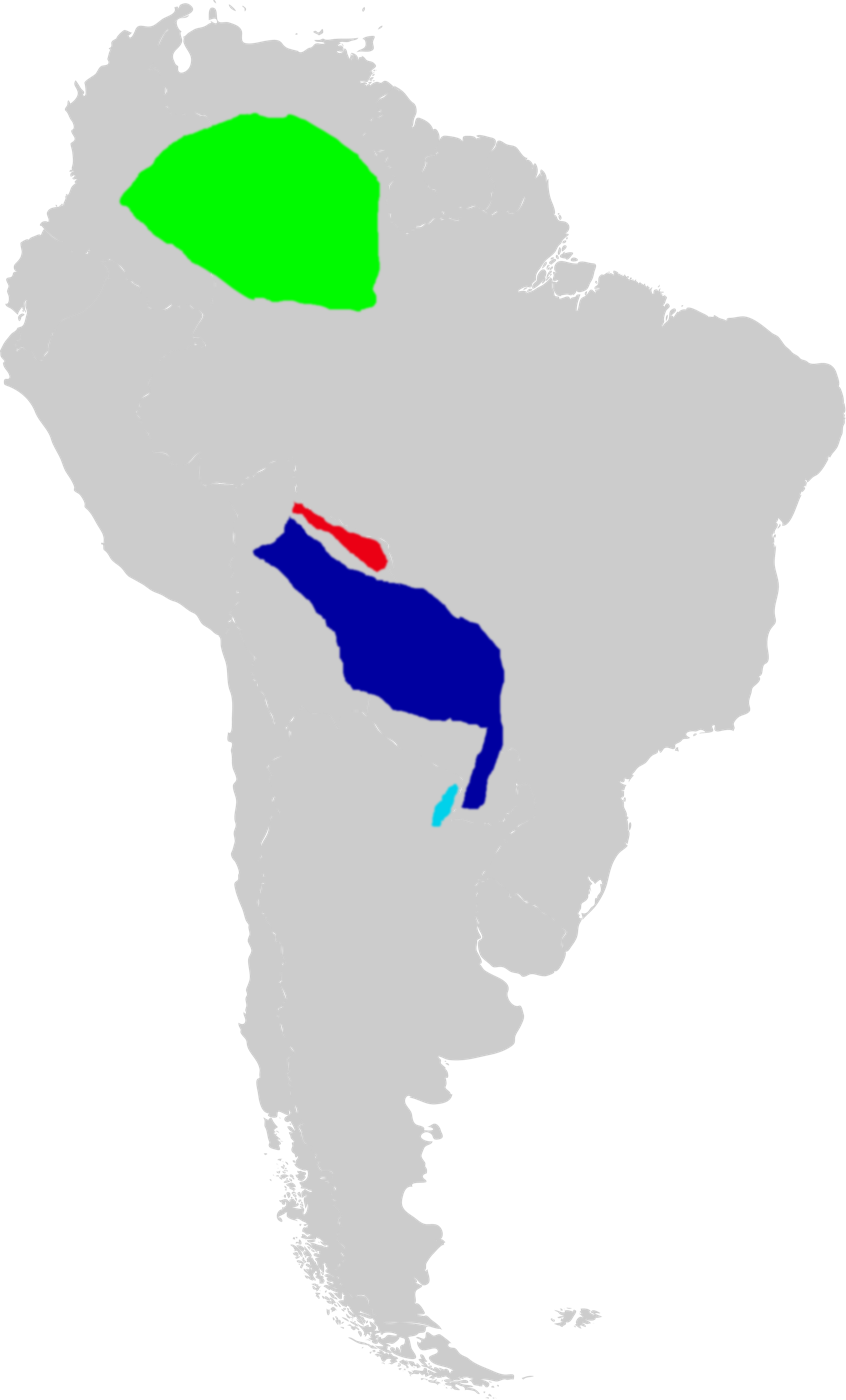
- Distribution of Oecomys sydandersoni (in red) and related species (green, Oecomys concolor; dark blue, Oecomys mamorae; light blue, Oecomys close to O. mamorae).

Species of rodent

Oecomys sydandersoni is an arboreal species of rodent in the genus Oecomys. It lives in forest patches in a small area in eastern Bolivia. It is a medium-sized species, weighing about 45 g (1.6 oz), with mostly grayish and brownish fur and short and broad hindfeet with well-developed pads.

First collected in 1964, it was formally described in 2009. The species may be most closely related to O. concolor and O. mamorae, which are distributed further north and south in South America. Among other characters, the three share a particular arrangement of the arteries of the head. Virtually nothing is known of its biology.

== Taxonomy ==
An American Museum of Natural History expedition led by Sydney Anderson collected the first three specimens of Oecomys sydandersoni in 1964 and 1965. The material was mentioned in passing in a report on the chiggers of the region and tentatively identified as O. concolor in publications of the 1990s. During studies in the Noel Kempff Mercado National Park (NKMNP) from 1997 to 2006, Smithsonian zoologist Louise Emmons and coworkers obtained large series of Oecomys, including four species—Oecomys bicolor, Oecomys roberti, Oecomys trinitatis, and a fourth species they could not identify to species level. In 2009, Michael Carleton, Louise Emmons, and Guy Musser described the latter as a new species, Oecomys sydandersoni, referring to it the specimens collected in the 1960s and previously identified as O. concolor. They named the new species after Sydney Anderson in honor of his work on the Bolivian mammal fauna, including the first collection of O. sydandersoni.

Its closest relatives may be O. concolor from the northern Amazon rainforest, including northwestern Brazil, southern Venezuela, and eastern Colombia, and O. mamorae from Bolivia, Paraguay, nearby Brazil, and possibly northeastern Argentina. The three share a particular configuration of the arteries in the head known as the derived carotid arterial circulatory pattern, which is unique within the genus Oecomys, and a general similarity in other traits. However, O. sydandersoni differs from the other two in characters of the fur and in metric characters. Whether the three species are truly closely related needs to be determined using molecular data.

All three are part of the genus Oecomys, which includes about fifteen species distributed in rainforest habitats in South America and into southern Central America. Oecomys is one of the genera of the tribe Oryzomyini ("rice rats"), a diverse assemblage of American rodents of over a hundred species, and on higher taxonomic levels is classified in the subfamily Sigmodontinae of family Cricetidae, along with hundreds of other species of mainly small rodents.

== Description ==
Oecomys sydandersoni is medium-sized for its genus, being larger than, for example, O. bicolor, but smaller than O. concolor and O. mamorae. Its short, soft, and fine fur is bright ochraceous brown to pale tawny on the upperparts, changing moderately abruptly into the generally gray underparts. The fur on the chin, throat, and part of the belly is entirely white. The head is more grayish than the rest of the upperparts and the eyelids are black. Short hairs thinly cover the external ears, which are brown to gray-brown in color. The short and broad hindfeet are dirty white and show some characters that are typical of the genus, including well-developed pads and tufts of hair on the digits and a long fifth digit. The tail is slightly longer than the head and body on average, but relatively short for the genus. It is uniformly brown, but with a somewhat paler portion below near its base. Sparsely haired, the tail ends in a rudimentary pencil. There is no evidence for sexual dimorphism.

Measurements from 20 specimens.
Measurement	Range	Average
Head and body length	109 to 166 mm (4.3 to 6.5 in)	125.0 mm (4.92 in)
Tail length	115 to 145 mm (4.5 to 5.7 in)	132.8 mm (5.23 in)
Hindfoot length	21 to 27 mm (0.83 to 1.06 in)	24.1 mm (0.95 in)
Ear length	15 to 19 mm (0.59 to 0.75 in)	16.4 mm (0.65 in)
Mass	30 to 57 g (1.1 to 2.0 oz)	44.9 g (1.58 oz)

The skull shows a short front part (rostrum) and a broad interorbital region (located between the eyes). The roof of the braincase is marked by supraorbital shelves. The incisive foramina, which perforate the front part of the palate, are very broad and extend between the first molars. The zygomatic plates, the flattened anterior portions of the zygomatic arches (cheekbones), are expansive and show well-developed notches at their front ends. The palate itself is flat and ends a little behind the third molars. The posterolateral palatal pits, located near the third molars, are well developed. The mesopterygoid fossa, the opening behind the end of the palate, is rounded at the frond and broad. An extension of the alisphenoid bone known as the alisphenoid strut is usually present, separating two foramina (openings), the foramen ovale accessorium and the masticatory-buccinator foramen. The roof of the tympanic cavity, the tegmen tympani, is small.

The upper incisors are opisthodont, with the chewing edge located behind the vertical plane of the incisors. As is usual for the genus, the molars are brachyodont, low-crowned, and bunodont, with the cusps higher than the connecting crests, and accessory crests such as mesolophs are present. On the upper first molar, the frontmost cusp, the anterocone, is divided into two small cusps in young individuals, connected by a crest, but the two fuse with wear.

== Distribution and ecology ==
O. sydandersoni is known from the departments of Beni and Santa Cruz in eastern Bolivia, including the Noel Kempff Mercado National Park (NKMNP), where the type locality is located. All but a few specimens come from pockets of woodland in seasonally flooded grasslands, where it is the most frequently encountered rodent; the related oryzomyine Hylaeamys acritus, the spiny rat Proechimys longicaudatus, and the opossum Marmosa murina were found in the same habitat. It is absent in other, more contiguous forests and in other grasslands without large forest patches. Thus, O. sydandersoni is a narrow habitat specialist with a limited distribution. It joins several other species with restricted ranges found in the NKMNP, including Hylaeamys acritus, the akodontine rodents Juscelinomys guaporensis and J. huanchae, and an opossum, Cryptonanus unduaviensis.

All specimens from the NKMNP were caught above the ground in vegetation, suggesting that the species is arboreal like the other members of its genus. The chigger Eutrombicula batatas has been found on O. sydandersoni. Nothing else is known about ecology, behavior, diet, reproduction, or conservation status.

== Literature cited ==
- Anderson, S. 1997. Mammals of Bolivia, taxonomy and distribution. Bulletin of the American Museum of Natural History 231:1–652.
- Brennan, J.M. 1970. Chiggers from the Bolivian-Brazilian border (Acarina: Trombiculidae) (subscription required). Journal of Parasitology 56:807–812.
- Carleton, M.D., Emmons, L.H. and Musser, G.G. 2009. A new species of the rodent genus Oecomys (Cricetidae: Sigmodontinae: Oryzomyini) from eastern Bolivia, with emended definitions of O. concolor (Wagner) and O. mamorae (Thomas). American Museum Novitates 3661:1–32.
- Emmons, L.H., Chávez, V., Rocha, N., Phillips, B., Phillips, I., Aguila, L.F. del and Swarner, M.J. 2006. The non-flying mammals of Noel Kempff Mercado National Park (Bolivia). Revista Boliviana de Ecología 19:23–46.
- Musser, G.G. and Carleton, M.D. 2005. Superfamily Muroidea. pp. 894–1531 in Wilson, D.E. and Reeder, D.M. (eds.). Mammal Species of the World: a taxonomic and geographic reference. 3rd ed. Baltimore: The Johns Hopkins University Press, 2 vols., 2142 pp. ISBN 978-0-8018-8221-0
- Weksler, M. 2006. Phylogenetic relationships of oryzomyine rodents (Muroidea: Sigmodontinae): separate and combined analyses of morphological and molecular data. Bulletin of the American Museum of Natural History 296:1–149.
