= Molelike mouse =

Scientific classification
- Kingdom: Animalia
- Phylum: Chordata
- Class: Mammalia
- Order: Rodentia
- Family: Cricetidae
- Subfamily: Sigmodontinae
- Genus: Juscelinomys
- Species: J. vulpinus

Binomial name
- Juscelinomys vulpinus Winge, 1888

Species of rodent

The molelike mouse, Juscelinomys vulpinus, is a rodent species from South America. It is found in Brazil.
