= João Moojen =

Brazilian zoologist

- Born: December 1, 1904; Leopoldina
- Died: March 31, 1985; Rio de Janeiro

João Moojen de Oliveira (December 1, 1904 in Leopoldina, MG, Brazil – March 31, 1985 in Rio de Janeiro, RJ, Brazil) was a zoologist dedicated to the systematics of Brazilian mammals, particularly rodents and primates. He was also interested in birds. He collected extensively between the 1930s and 50s and wrote "Os Roedores do Brasil" in 1952, a key book on Brazilian rodents. He was an authority on spiny rats of the genus Phyllomys.

As well as performing research, Moojen worked significantly as a teacher and technical advisor; positions held include: head of the Biology Department of Escola Superior de Agricultura e Veterinária do Estado de Minas Gerais, in Viçosa; Professor-Head of Natural History of Colégio Universitário da Universidade do Brasil; Naturalist of Vertebrate and Invertebrate Zoology Division of Museu Nacional including headed this division into two stages and collected most of the mammals deposited in this collection and in Universidade do Estado do Rio de Janeiro; zoologist of the Rockefeller Foundation; member of Society of the Sigma Xi for the Promotion of Research in Science, the American Society of Mammalogists, the Cooper Ornithological Club and Phi Sigma Biological Society; commissioned by the Federal Government to organize the Brasília Zoo-Botanical, and was also Director of the Department for Nature Protection of Brasília.

== Genus and species of Rodents described by Moojen ==
Genus

- Juscelinomys Moojen, 1965

Species and sub-species

- Trinomys paratus Moojen, 1948
- Trinomys gratiosus Moojen, 1948
  - T. g. gratiosus Moojen, 1948
  - T. g. bonafidei Moojen, 1948
- Phyllomys kerri Moojen, 1950
- Juscelinomys candango Moojen, 1965
- Kerodon acrobata Moojen, Locks & Langguth, 1997

== Genus and species in honor of Moojen ==
- Pisces – Characidae: Moojenichthys Ribeiro, 1956
- Opilionida – Gonyleptidae: Moojenia Mello Leitão, 1935
- Diplopoda – Vanhoeffeniidae: Moojenodesmus Schubart, 1944
- Reptilia – Viperidae: Bothrops moojeni Hoge, 1965
- Scorpinida – Bothriuridae: Bothriurus moojeni Mello Leitão, 1945
- Scolopendromorpha – Scolopendridae: Scolopendra angulata moojeni Bücherl, 1941
- Rodentia – Echimyidae: Trinomys moojeni Pessôa, Oliveira & Reis, 1992
- Rodenia – Cricetidae: Oligoryzomys moojeni Weksler & Bonvicino, 2005
