= Oligoryzomys moojeni =

Conservation status
- Data Deficient (IUCN 3.1)

Scientific classification
- Kingdom: Animalia
- Phylum: Chordata
- Class: Mammalia
- Order: Rodentia
- Family: Cricetidae
- Subfamily: Sigmodontinae
- Genus: Oligoryzomys
- Species: O. moojeni

Binomial name
- Oligoryzomys moojeni Weksler & Bonvicino, 2005

Species of rodent

Oligoryzomys moojeni is a species of rodent from South America in the genus Oligoryzomys of family Cricetidae. It is known only from central Brazil, where it is found in the cerrado and gallery forests. It is named after twentieth-century Brazilian zoologist João Moojen. Its karyotype has 2n = 70 and FNa = 84.

== Literature cited ==
- Musser, G. G.; Carleton, M. D. (2005). "Superfamily Muroidea". In Wilson, D. E.; Reeder, D. M. (eds.). Mammal Species of the World: A Taxonomic and Geographic Reference (3rd ed.). Johns Hopkins University Press. pp. 894–1531. ISBN 978-0-8018-8221-0. OCLC 62265494.
