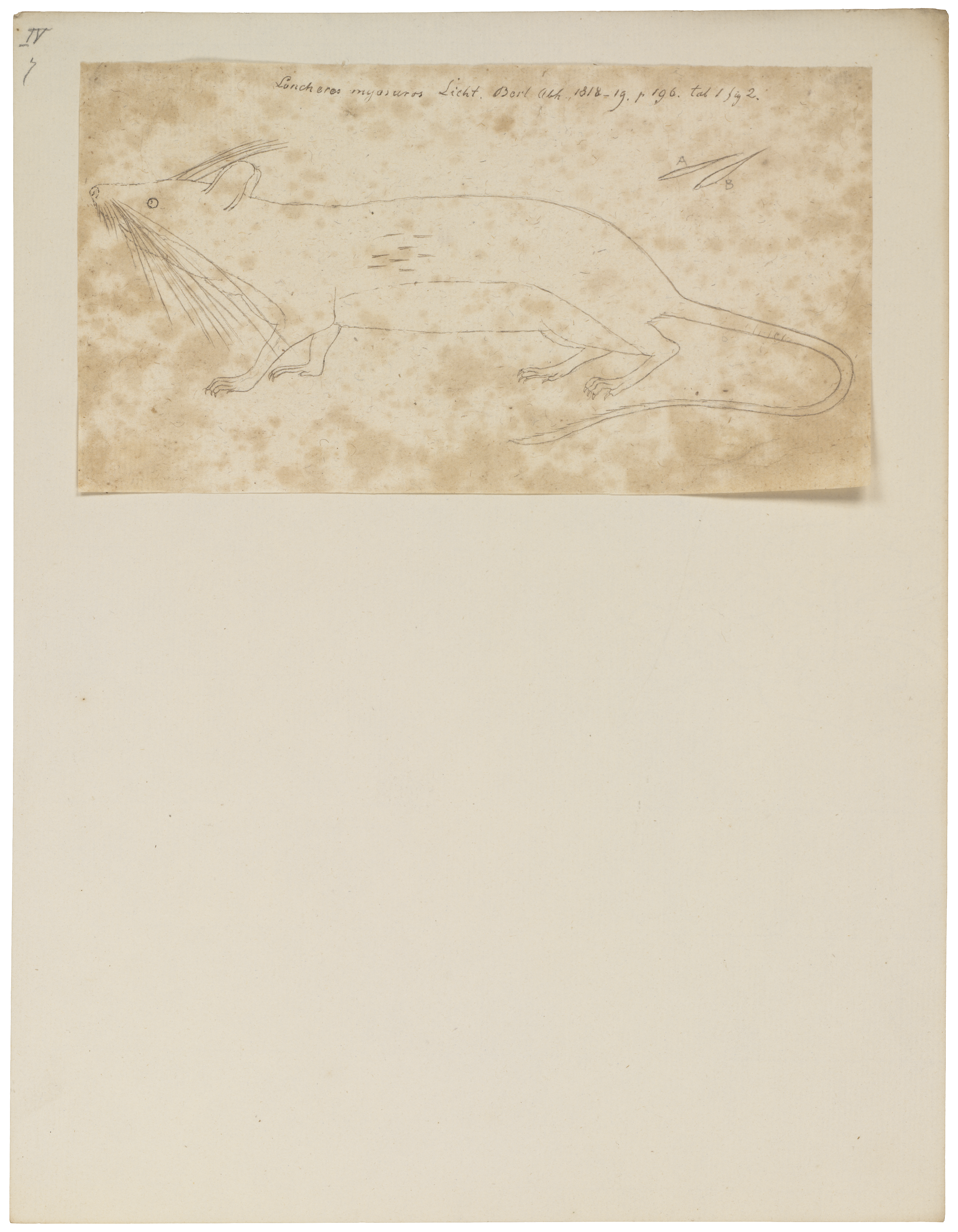

Conservation status
- Least Concern (IUCN 3.1)

Scientific classification
- Kingdom: Animalia
- Phylum: Chordata
- Class: Mammalia
- Infraclass: Placentalia
- Order: Rodentia
- Family: Echimyidae
- Subfamily: Euryzygomatomyinae
- Genus: Trinomys
- Species: T. myosuros

Binomial name
- Trinomys myosuros (Lichtenstein, 1830)
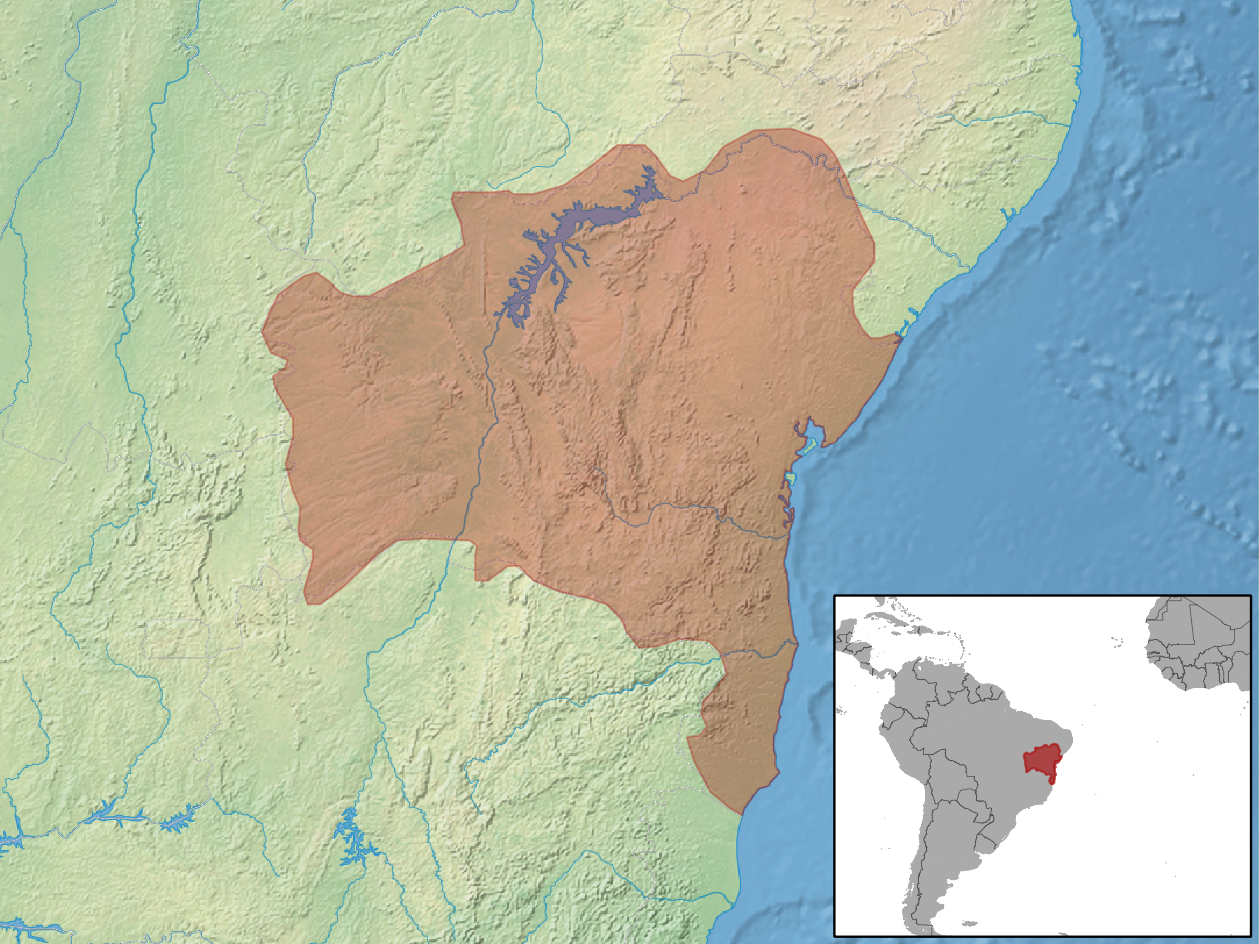

Synonyms
- Proechimys myosuros

= Mouse-tailed Atlantic spiny rat =

Mouse-tailed Atlantic spiny-rat

Species of rodent

The mouse-tailed Atlantic spiny-rat (Trinomys myosuros) is a spiny rat species from South America. It is found in Brazil.
