= Moojen's Atlantic spiny rat =

Moojen's Atlantic spiny-rat

Conservation status
- Endangered (IUCN 3.1)

Scientific classification
- Kingdom: Animalia
- Phylum: Chordata
- Class: Mammalia
- Order: Rodentia
- Family: Echimyidae
- Subfamily: Euryzygomatomyinae
- Genus: Trinomys
- Species: T. moojeni

Binomial name
- Trinomys moojeni Pessôa, Oliveira and Reis, 1992
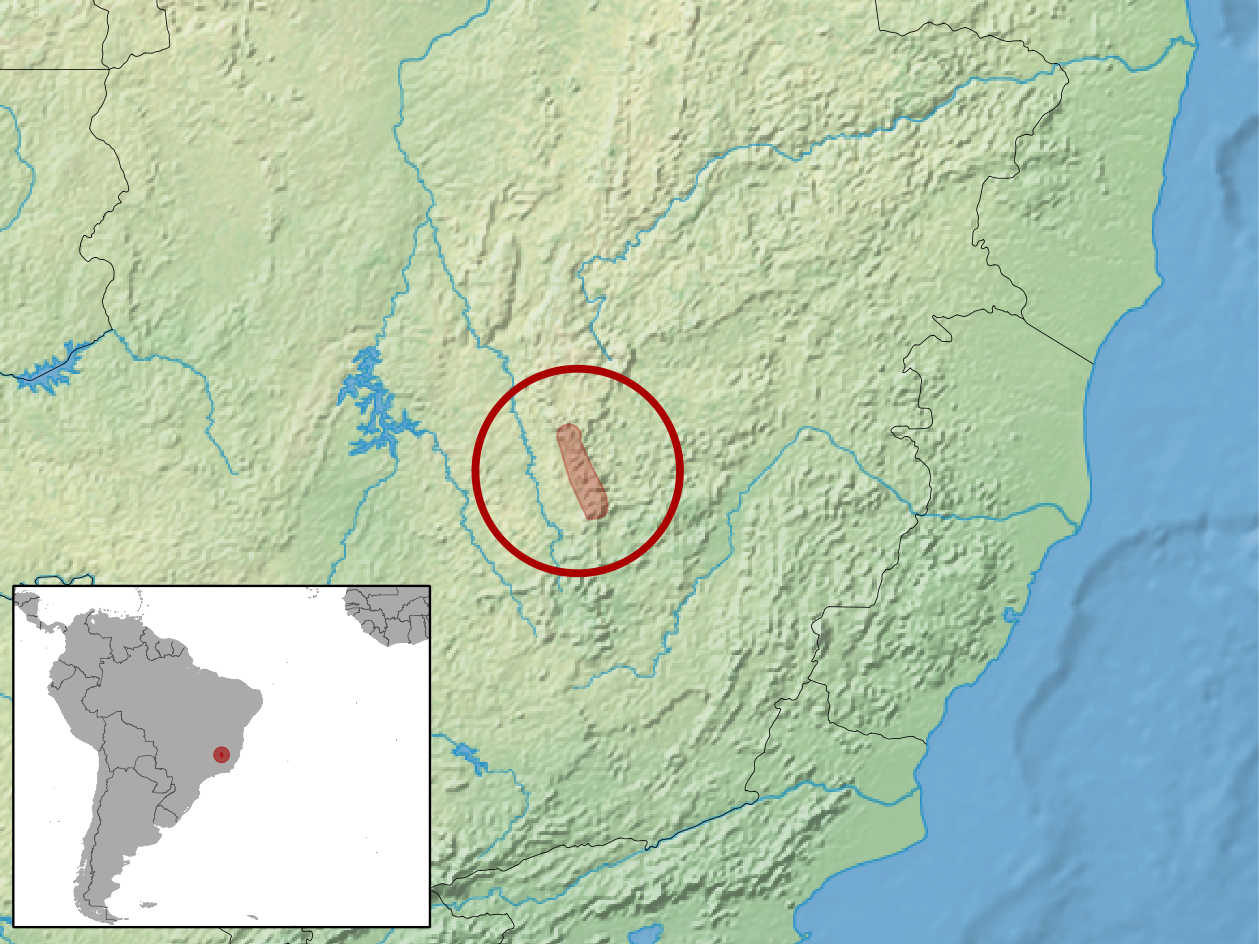

Species of rodent

Moojen's Atlantic spiny-rat, (Trinomys moojeni) is a spiny rat species from South America. It is found in Brazil. It is named after twentieth-century Brazilian zoologist João Moojen.

It is a small caviomorph rodent locally known as "Rabo-de-facho" (Portuguese) due to its retiform hairs and long penciled tail. The maximum head and body length of this species is 177mm.

These species is threatened by habitat loss and restricted geographical distribution. These rodents have a nocturnal habits, using hollow logs, and holes in the ground as shelters during the day. Their diet consists of seeds, fruits, fungi, leaves, and insects.
