= White-spined Atlantic spiny rat =

Conservation status
- Least Concern (IUCN 3.1)

Scientific classification
- Kingdom: Animalia
- Phylum: Chordata
- Class: Mammalia
- Order: Rodentia
- Family: Echimyidae
- Subfamily: Euryzygomatomyinae
- Genus: Trinomys
- Species: T. albispinus

Binomial name
- Trinomys albispinus (I. Geoffroy, 1838)

Subspecies
- See text
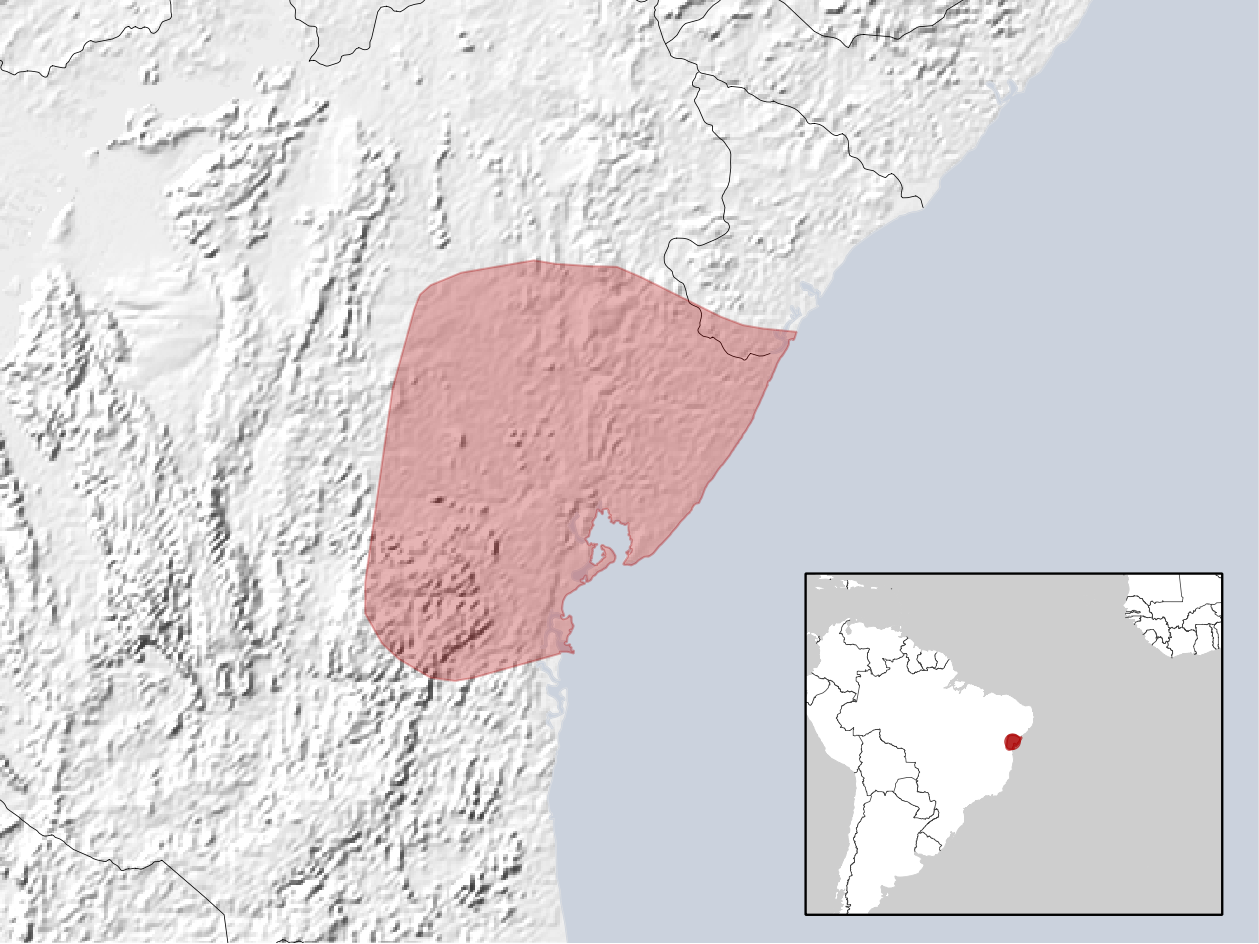

Synonyms
- Proechimys albispinus

Species of rodent

The white-spined Atlantic spiny rat (Trinomys albispinus) is a spiny rat species endemic to Brazil.

== Description ==
This is one of the smaller spiny rats, with a head-body length of 15 to 21 cm (5.9 to 8.3 in), and a tail 12 to 18 centimetres (4.7 to 7.1 in) long. Adult weight can be anything from 120 to 230 g (4.2 to 8.1 oz). The fur on the upper body and flanks is tawny to buff, interspersed with much paler (although usually not pure white) spines. The underparts, including the lower surface of the tail, are white.

Females are pregnant between January and June, and give birth to litters of up to four young.

== Distribution and habitat ==
T. albispinus is found in a relatively small region of eastern Brazil, in the states of Sergipe and Bahia. Compared with other spiny rats, they are adapted for a relatively dry climate, and the region is dominated semi-arid caatinga forest with a mix of deciduous trees and cactuses, among other plants.

Three subspecies are recognised from different parts of this region:

- T. a. albispinus - southern coastal parts of the range
- T. a. minor - inland parts of the range
- T. a. sertonius - northern coastal parts of the range
