= Oecomys concolor =

Conservation status
- Least Concern (IUCN 3.1)

Scientific classification
- Kingdom: Animalia
- Phylum: Chordata
- Class: Mammalia
- Order: Rodentia
- Family: Cricetidae
- Subfamily: Sigmodontinae
- Genus: Oecomys
- Species: O. concolor

Binomial name
- Oecomys concolor Wagner, 1845
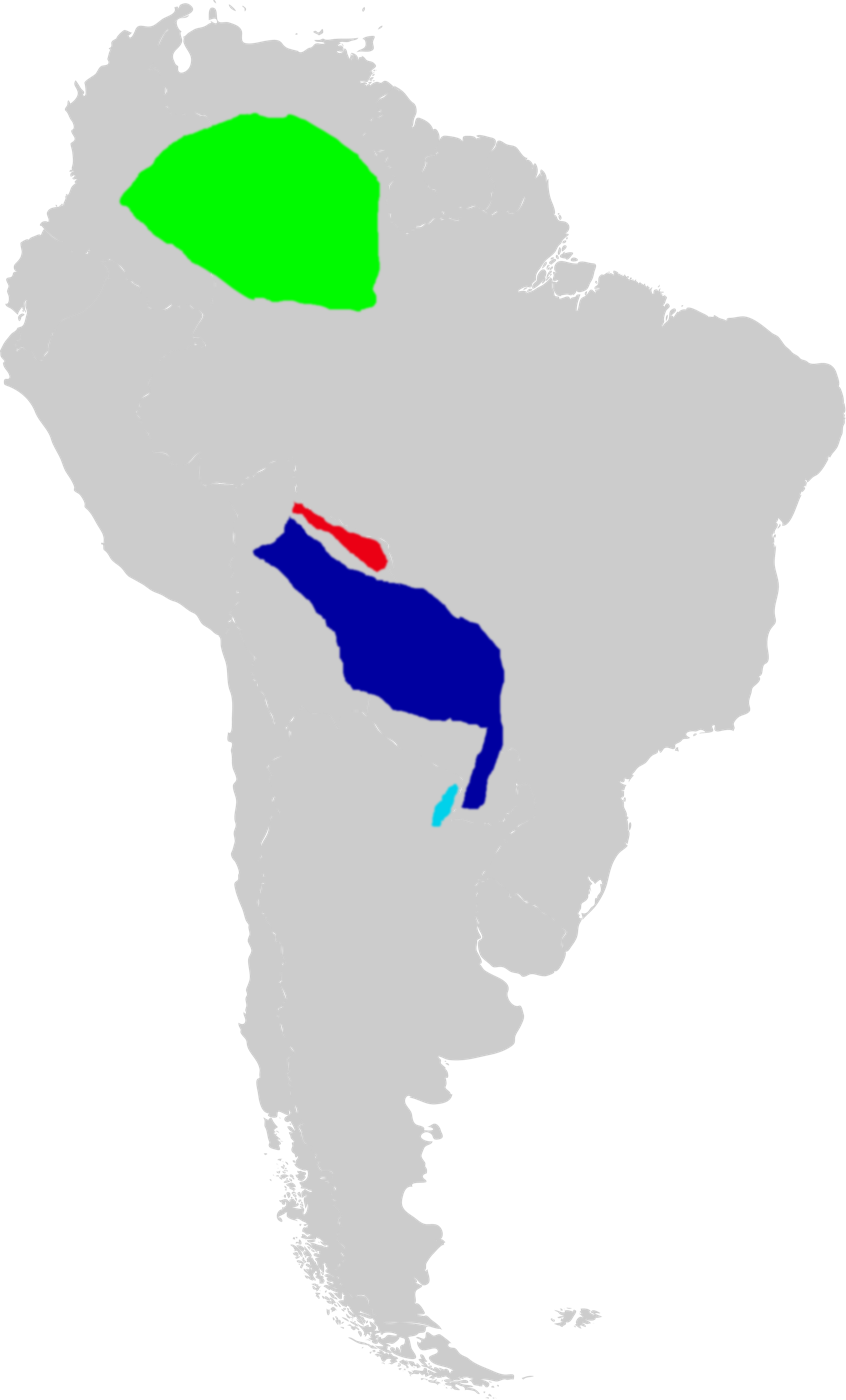
- Distribution of Oecomys concolor (in green) and related species (red, Oecomys sydandersoni; dark blue, Oecomys mamorae; light blue, Oecomys close to O. mamorae).

Species of rodent

Oecomys concolor, also known as the unicolored oecomys, unicolored rice rat, or unicolored arboreal rice rat, is a species of rodent in the genus Oecomys of family Cricetidae. It is found in tropical rainforest in the Amazon biome, but its range is poorly documented; it has been recorded in northwestern Brazil, southeastern Colombia, and southern Venezuela.

== Literature cited ==
- Carleton, M.D.; Emmons, L.H.; and Musser, G.G. (2009). "A new species of the rodent genus Oecomys (Cricetidae: Sigmodontinae: Oryzomyini) from eastern Bolivia, with emended definitions of O. concolor (Wagner) and O mamorae (Thomas)". American Museum Novitates (3661): 1–32. doi:10.1206/612.1. hdl:2246/5984.
- Musser, G. G.; Carleton, M. D. (2005). "Superfamily Muroidea". In Wilson, D. E.; Reeder, D. M. (eds.). Mammal Species of the World: A Taxonomic and Geographic Reference (3rd ed.). Johns Hopkins University Press. pp. 894–1531. ISBN 978-0-8018-8221-0. OCLC 62265494.
