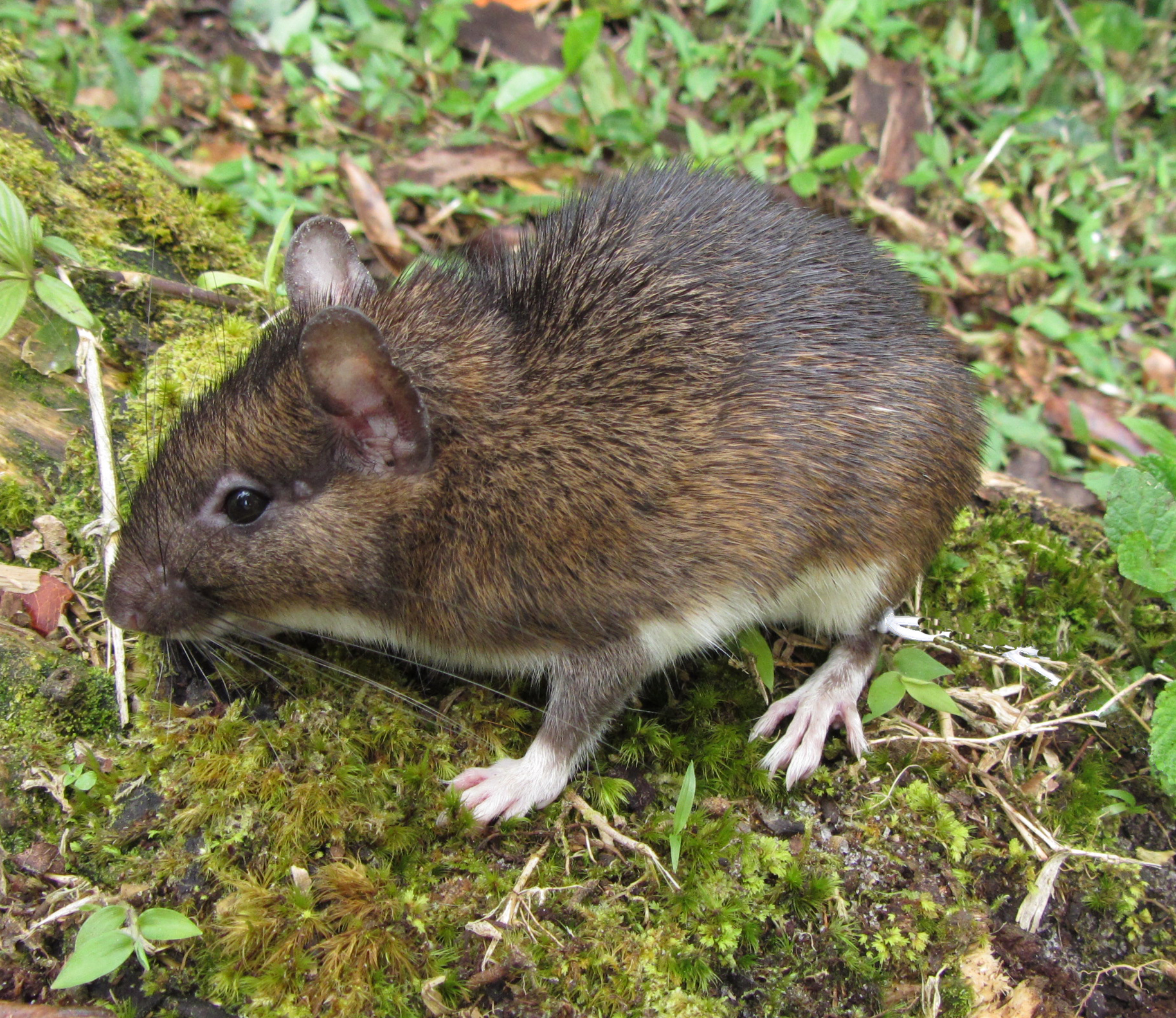

Scientific classification
- Kingdom: Animalia
- Phylum: Chordata
- Class: Mammalia
- Infraclass: Placentalia
- Order: Rodentia
- Family: Echimyidae
- Subfamily: Euryzygomatomyinae
- Genus: Trinomys; Thomas, 1921

Type species
- Echimys albispinus I. Geoffroy, 1838

Species
- Trinomys albispinus Trinomys dimidiatus Trinomys eliasi Trinomys gratiosus Trinomys iheringi Trinomys mirapitanga Trinomys moojeni Trinomys myosuros Trinomys paratus Trinomys setosus Trinomys yonenagae
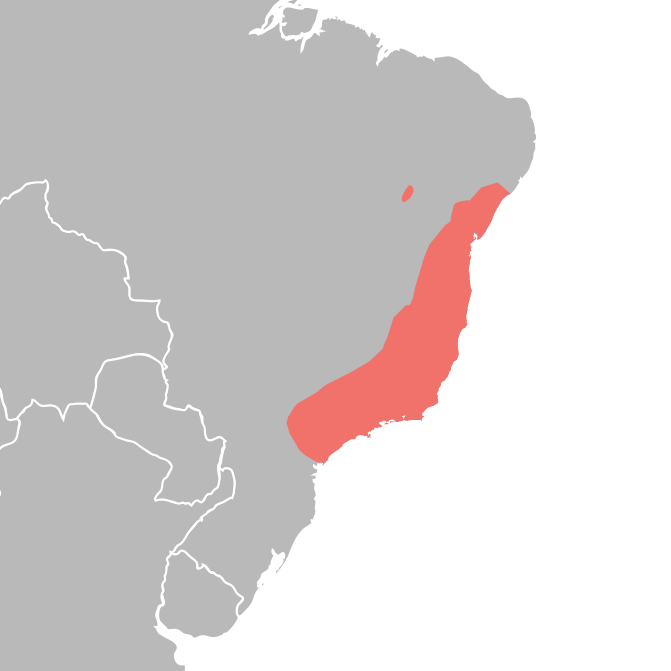
- Trinomys distribution

= Atlantic spiny rat =

Genus of mammals belonging to the spiny rat family of rodents

The Atlantic spiny rats are all found in the genus Trinomys. They are a group of South American spiny-rats in the family Echimyidae.

== Extant species of Trinomys ==
Based on Natureserve.

Trinomys albispinus	White-spined Atlantic spiny rat
Trinomys dimidiatus	Soft-spined Atlantic spiny rat
Trinomys eliasi	Elias's Atlantic spiny rat
Trinomys gratiosus	Gracile Atlantic spiny rat
Trinomys iheringi	Ihering's Atlantic spiny rat
Trinomys mirapitanga	Dark-caped Atlantic spiny rat
Trinomys moojeni	Moojen's Atlantic spiny rat
Trinomys myosuros	Mouse-tailed Atlantic spiny rat
Trinomys paratus	Spiked Atlantic spiny rat
Trinomys setosus	Hairy Atlantic spiny rat
Trinomys yonenagae	Yonenaga's Atlantic spiny rat

The species of spiny rats in the genus Trinomys are apparently all Brazilian. In particular many of them are endemic to the Atlantic Forest of southeastern Brazil. Not much is known for certain about their ranges however, which still are being investigated, with frequent extensions to the recorded distributions of several species in various ecological classes of forest and dry land. They do not however appear to occur at high altitudes, and several of their ranges appear to be parapatric. Most species of Trinomys are terrestrial and ambulatory, though Trinomys yonenagae is unusual that it is semi-fossorial, living in colonial burrows, and exhibits incipient specializations for saltatorial locomotion.

== Phylogeny ==
=== Genus level ===
Trinomys is the sister genus to the fossorial genera Clyomys and Euryzygomatomys. In turn, these three genera — forming the clade of Euryzygomatomyinae — share phylogenetic affinities with a clade containing Carterodon and members of the family Capromyidae.

Cladogram of the Euryzygomatomyinae
with their relationship to Carterodon and Capromyidae.

- Octodontoidea
  - Euryzygomatomyinae
    - Trinomys (Atlantic spiny rats)
    - - Clyomys
      - Euryzygomatomys (guiaras)
  - - Carterodon (Owl's spiny rat)
    - Capromyidae
      - Plagiodontini
        Plagiodontia
      - Capromyini
        - Geocapromys
        - - Capromys (Desmarest's hutia)
          - - Mesocapromys
            - Mysateles

The cladogram has been reconstructed from mitochondrial and nuclear DNA characters.
