= Rio Guaporé mouse =

Conservation status
- Data Deficient (IUCN 3.1)

Scientific classification
- Kingdom: Animalia
- Phylum: Chordata
- Class: Mammalia
- Order: Rodentia
- Family: Cricetidae
- Subfamily: Sigmodontinae
- Genus: Juscelinomys
- Species: J. guaporensis

Binomial name
- Juscelinomys guaporensis Emmons, 1999

Species of rodent

The Rio Guaporé mouse or Guaporé akodont (Juscelinomys guaporensis) was formerly considered a rodent species in the family Cricetidae. It is known only from a small savanna in eastern Bolivia near the Rio Guaporé. However, in 2012 it was described as being conspecific with J. huanchacae.
