= Yonenaga's Atlantic spiny rat =

Yonenaga's Atlantic spiny-rat

Conservation status
- Endangered (IUCN 3.1)

Scientific classification
- Kingdom: Animalia
- Phylum: Chordata
- Class: Mammalia
- Order: Rodentia
- Family: Echimyidae
- Subfamily: Euryzygomatomyinae
- Genus: Trinomys
- Species: T. yonenagae

Binomial name
- Trinomys yonenagae (Rocha, 1995)
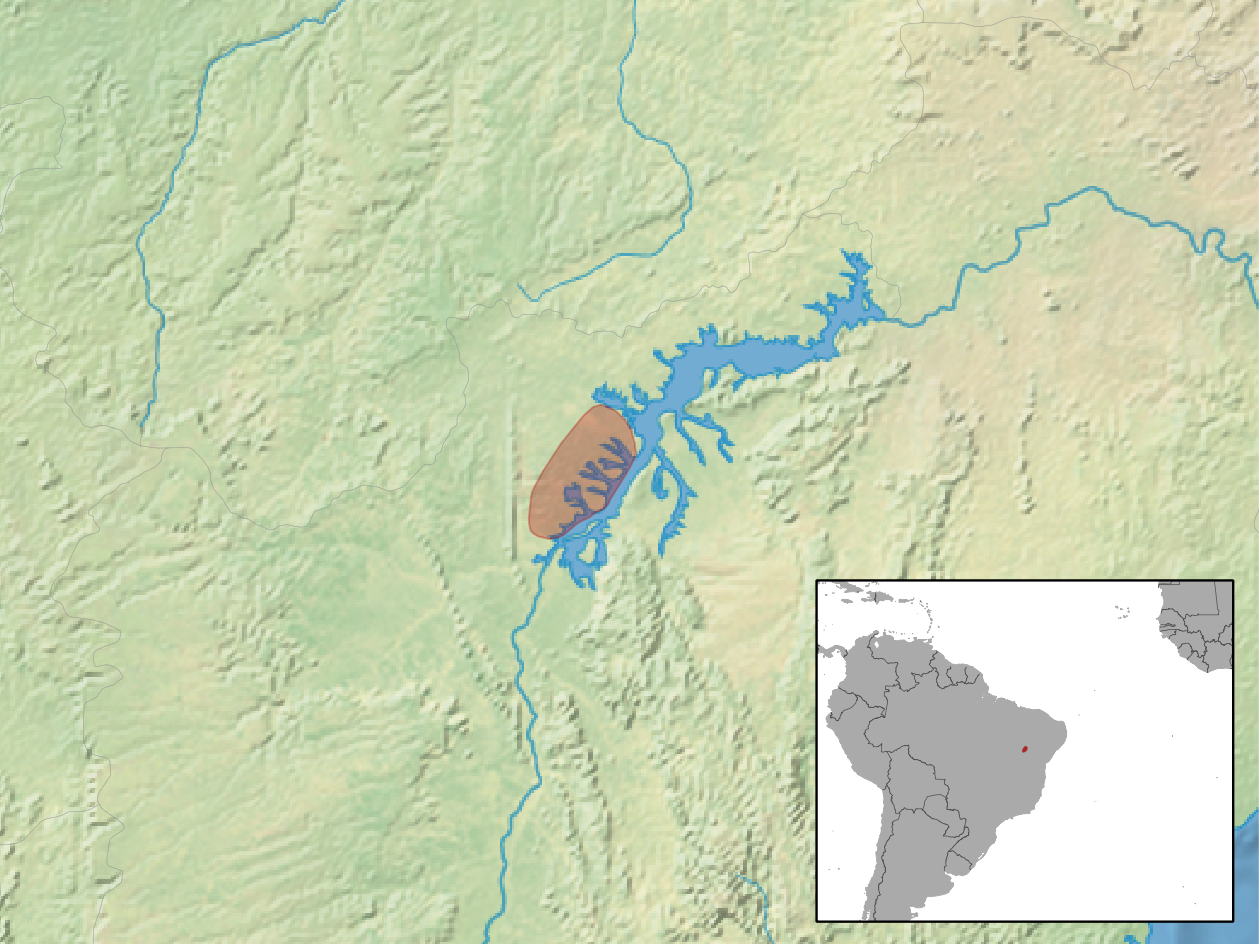

Synonyms
- Proechimys yonenagae Rocha, 1995

Species of rodent

Yonenaga's Atlantic spiny-rat (Trinomys yonenagae) or torch-tail spiny rat is a spiny rat species endemic to Brazil. Locally, it is known as rabo de facho. Named for Yatiyo Yonenaga-Yassuda, a cytogenetics researcher, it is considered an endangered species due to its highly restricted distribution and ongoing habitat loss. Genetic evidence shows that it diverged from its closest living relative, the hairy Atlantic spiny rat, around 8.5 million years ago, during the Late Miocene.

== Description ==
This is a comparatively small spiny rat, with an average head and body length of 16 centimetres (6.3 in) and a tail that averages 19 centimetres (7.5 in) long. It has large hind feet which, together with the long tail, are likely related to the fact that it mainly moves by hopping. The ears are also unusually large, as are the bony structures surrounding the inner ear. The fur is near-white on the underparts, but is otherwise grey in infants, changing to a richer brown colour as the animal reaches adulthood. Despite the name, the fur is mostly soft, although there are longer, flexible, dark-coloured bristles scattered across the body that correspond to the spines on most other spiny rats. An enlarged and modified sebaceous gland is present near the anus, and produces a secretion described as having a "tutti-frutti-like" odour.

== Distribution and habitat ==
Yonenaga's Atlantic spiny rat is known only from an approximately 130 kilometres (81 mi) stretch of the west bank of the São Francisco River in Bahia state, Brazil. This region is covered by sandy dunes on the border between the cerrado and caatinga habitats of eastern Brazil. It is considered a semi-arid habitat, with the sparse local plant life dominated by cactuses and bromeliads.

== Behaviour ==
Despite living in a hot, dry, and sandy environment, Yonenaga's Atlantic spiny rat has few of the anatomic and physiologic adaptations expected of a desert-dwelling animal and instead relies on its behaviour to avoid the worst of the local conditions. It is nocturnal, and unlike other, closely related, spiny rats, digs burrows in which it spends the day. The burrows are shared communally, typically located in valleys between sand dunes where plants can provide local shade, and may extend 15 metres (49 ft) below the surface. They are omnivorous, eating some insects, but primarily feeding on the local vegetation, including araçá-boi fruit, from which they obtain much of their water.

Each burrow system is shared by up to eight adults, plus a variable number of young. The species does not appear to be territorial, and multiple females living in the same burrow raise young simultaneously. While aggression between neighbours is occasionally seen, most social behaviours are affiliative, including grooming, nose-to-nose or nose-to-ear rubbing and huddling. Even when intruders of the same species enter the burrow system, aggression is limited, and the individuals are more likely to huddle together than to fight. As vision is limited in their environment, in addition to vocal communication and drumming with their feet as warning signals, they rely on scents from anal glands to provide cues to identify and discern intentions of other rodents in the colony.

== Reproduction ==
Yonenaga's Atlantic spiny rat breeds throughout the year, although young born during the dry season are much less likely to survive. Courtship involves foot-stamping, calls, and neck-biting by the males. The species is thought to be monogamous, but individuals of both sexes have been recorded helping to care for young that are not their biological offspring within the communal burrows. Pregnancy lasts for three months, and typically results in the birth of two young. The young are born with fine grey fur, with their eyes open and already able to move around. Sexual maturity occurs between three and four months of age, and the young may remain in the burrow of their birth well into adulthood, rather than dispersing to establish a new colony. In captivity they have been reported to live for up to 13 years, unusually long for a rodent of their size.
