= Caatinga =

Type of desert vegetation and an ecoregion in northeastern Brazil

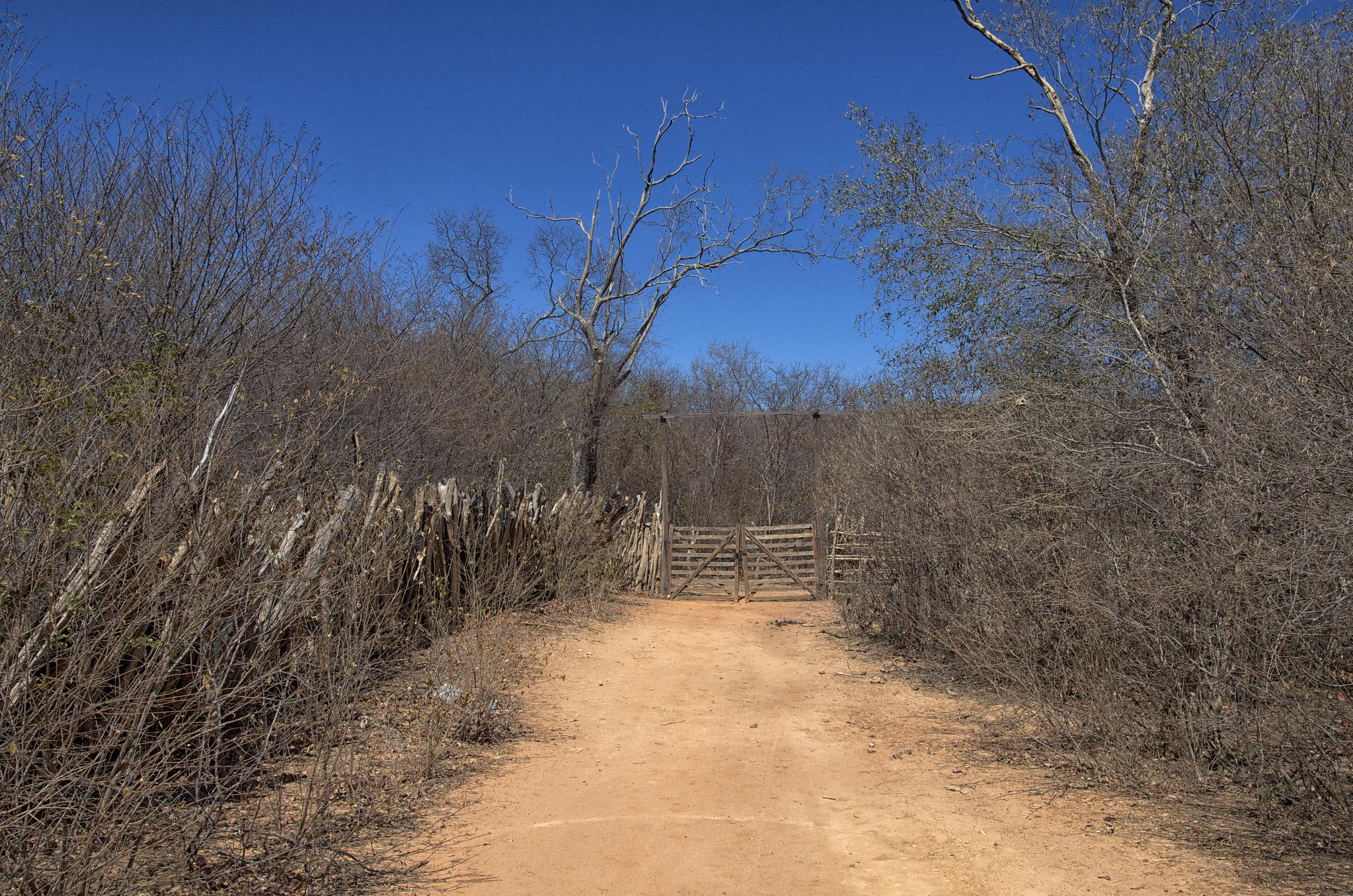
- Landscape

- Map of the Caatinga ecoregion.

Ecology
- Realm: Neotropical
- Biome: deserts and xeric shrublands
- Borders: List: Atlantic Coast restingas; Atlantic dry forests; Bahia interior forests; Caatinga moist-forest enclaves; Campos rupestres; Cerrado; Maranhão Babaçu forests; Northeastern Brazil restingas; Pernambuco coastal forests; Pernambuco interior forests

Geography
- Area: 730,850 km^{2} (282,180 mi^{2})
- Countries: Brazil
- States: List: Alagoas; Bahia; Ceará; Minas Gerais; Paraíba; Pernambuco; Piauí; Rio Grande do Norte; Sergipe
- Coordinates: 7.612796°S 39.433699°W

Conservation
- Conservation status: Vulnerable
- Protected: 44,133 km² (6%)

Caatinga (/kəˈtɪŋɡə, ˌkɑːˈtʃɪŋɡə/; [kaaˈt͡ʃĩɡɐ]) is a type of semi-arid tropical vegetation, and an ecoregion characterized by this vegetation in interior northeastern Brazil. The name "Caatinga" comes from the Old Tupi word ka'atinga, meaning 'white forest' (ka'a = 'forest, vegetation'; tinga = 'white'). The Caatinga is a xeric shrubland and thorn forest, which consists primarily of small, thorny trees that shed their leaves seasonally. Cacti, thick-stemmed plants, thorny brush, and arid-adapted grasses make up the ground layer. Most vegetation experiences a brief burst of activity during the three-month-long rainy season.

The Caatinga falls entirely within earth's tropical zone and is one of six major biomes of Brazil. It covers 912,529 km², nearly 10% of Brazil's territory. It is home to 26 million people and over 2,000 species of plants, fish, reptiles, amphibians, birds, and mammals.

The Caatinga is the only exclusively Brazilian biome, which means that a large part of its biological heritage cannot be found anywhere else on the planet.

== Geography ==
The Caatinga covers the interior portion of northeastern Brazil bordering the Atlantic seaboard (save for a fringe of Atlantic Forest), extending across nine states: Piauí, Ceará, Rio Grande do Norte, Paraíba, Pernambuco, Alagoas, Sergipe, Bahia, and parts of Minas Gerais. Altogether, the Caatinga comprises 850,000 km², about 10% of the surface area of Brazil. By comparison, it is over nine times the surface area of Portugal, whence came Brazil's early European settlers.

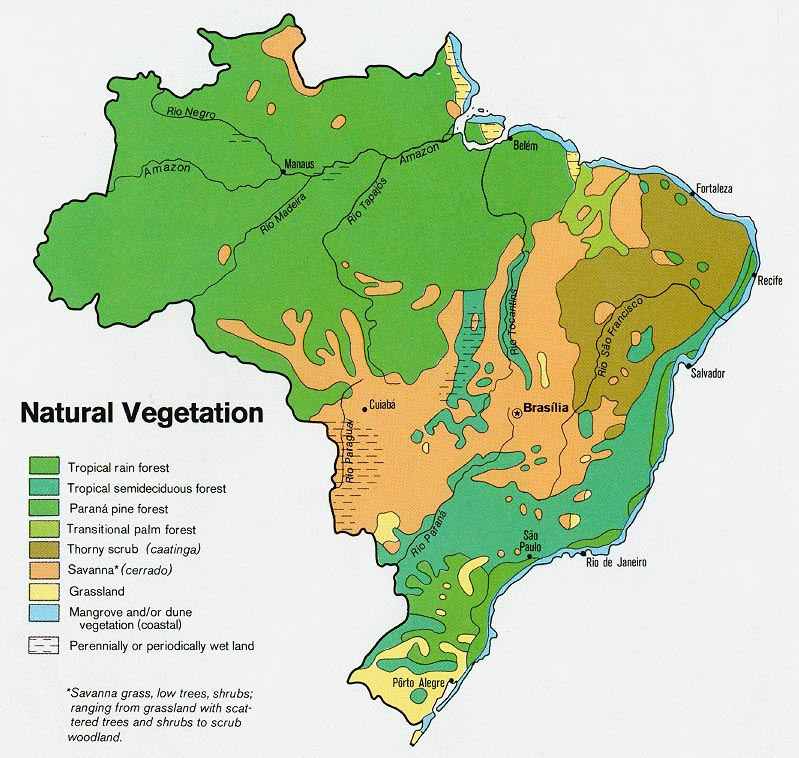
Approximate vegetation map of Brazil. The Caatinga is brown.

Located between 3°S 45°W and 17°S 35°W, the Caatinga experiences irregular winds from all directions. Rainfall is thus intermittent but intense, totaling 20–80 cm (7.9–31.5 in) on average. Although the climate is typically hot and semi-arid, the Caatinga includes several enclaves of humid tropical forest, with trees 30–35 m (98–115 ft) tall.

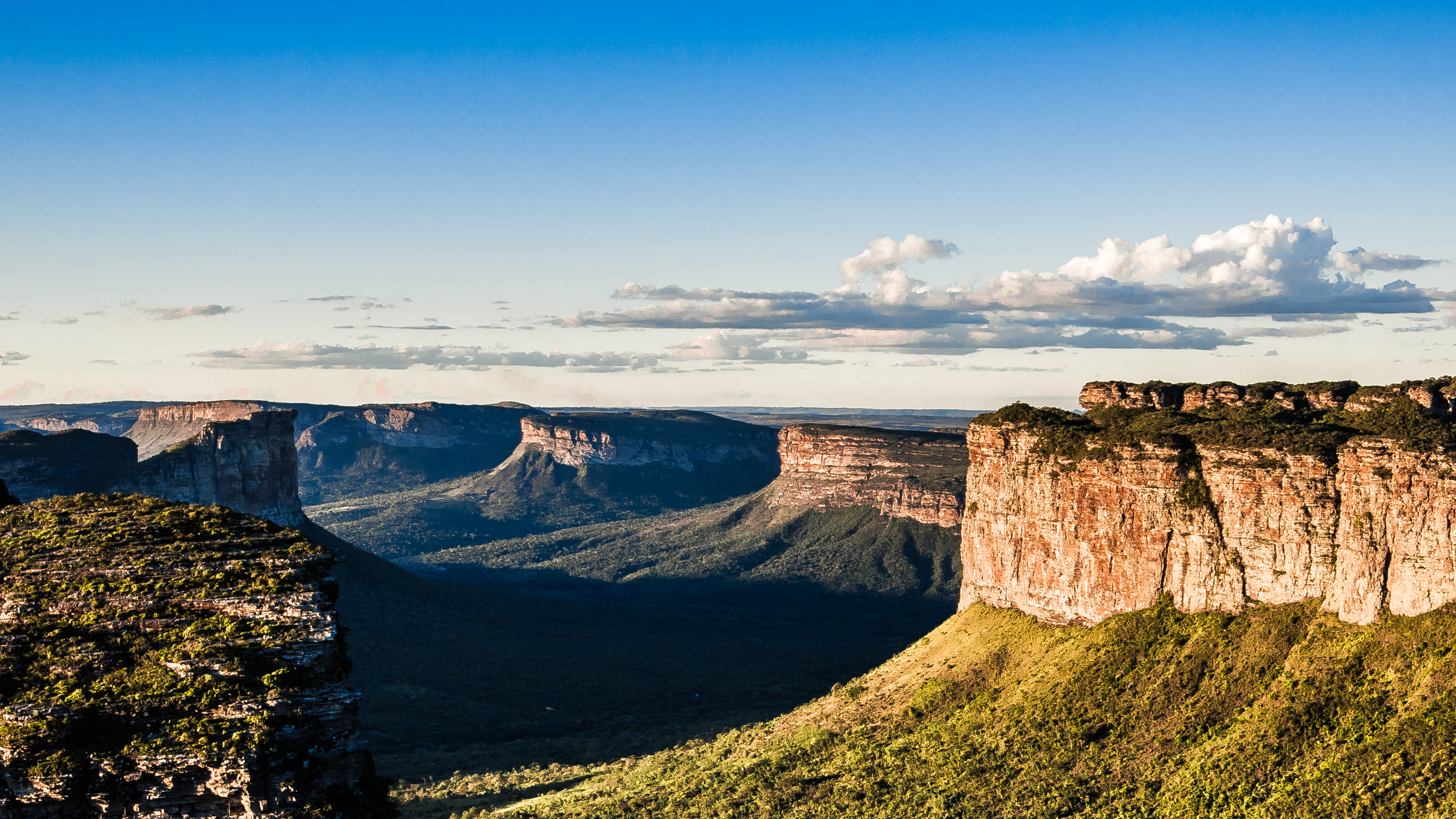
Chapada Diamantina in Bahia state, in Brazil

To the northwest, the Caatinga is bounded by the Maranhão Babaçu forests; to the west and southwest, the Atlantic dry forests and Cerrado savannas; to the east, the humid Atlantic coastal forests; and to the north and northeast, the Atlantic Ocean.

== Climate ==
During the dry winter periods there is no foliage or undergrowth, as plants try to conserve water. Roots protrude through the surface of the stony soil, to absorb water before it is evaporated. Leaves fall off the trees to reduce transpiration. With all the foliage and undergrowth dead during the drought periods and all the trees having no leaves the Caatinga has a yellow-grey, desert-like look. During the peak periods of drought the Caatinga's soil can reach temperatures of up to 60 °C.

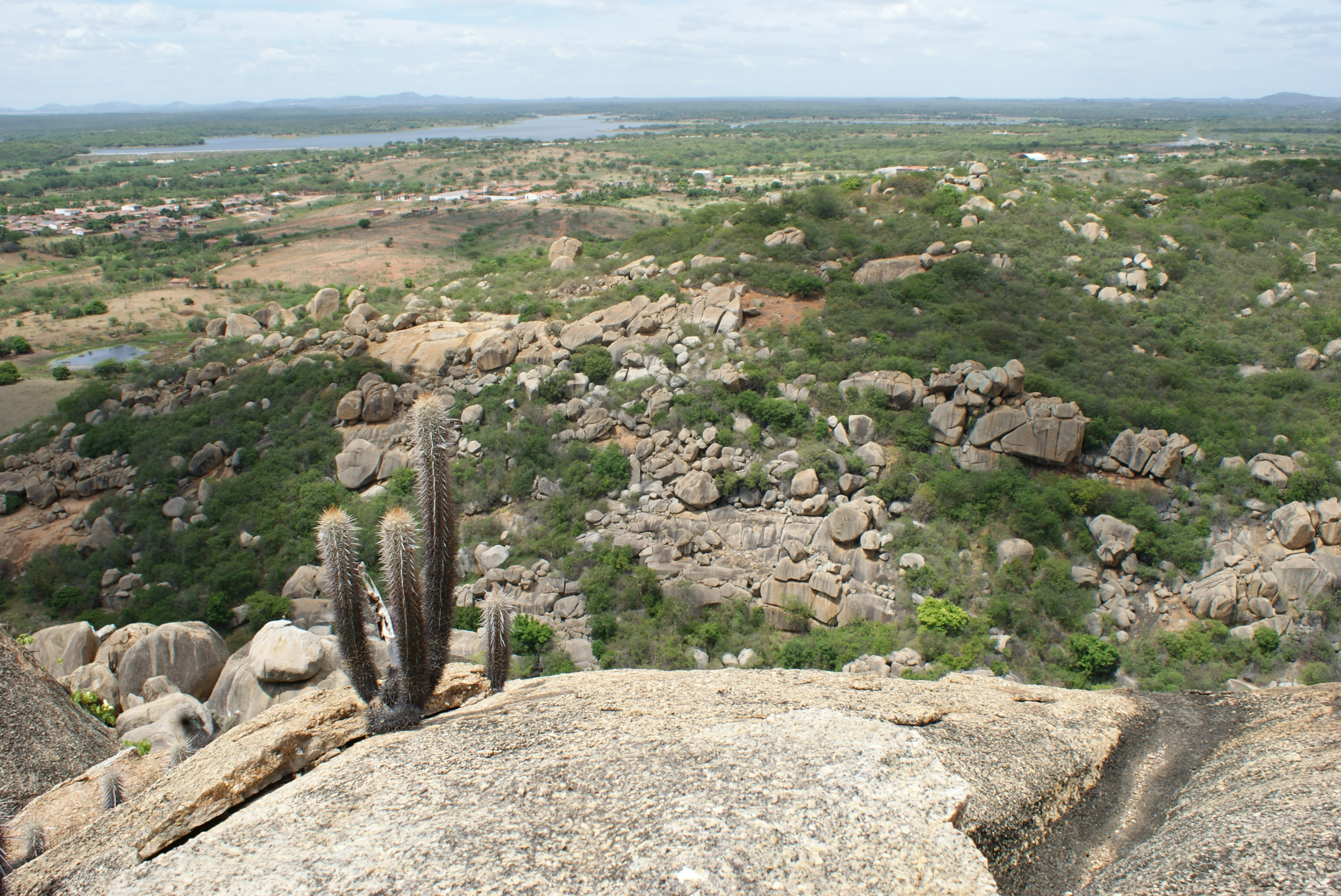
Common rock formations in the caatinga, during the rainy season.

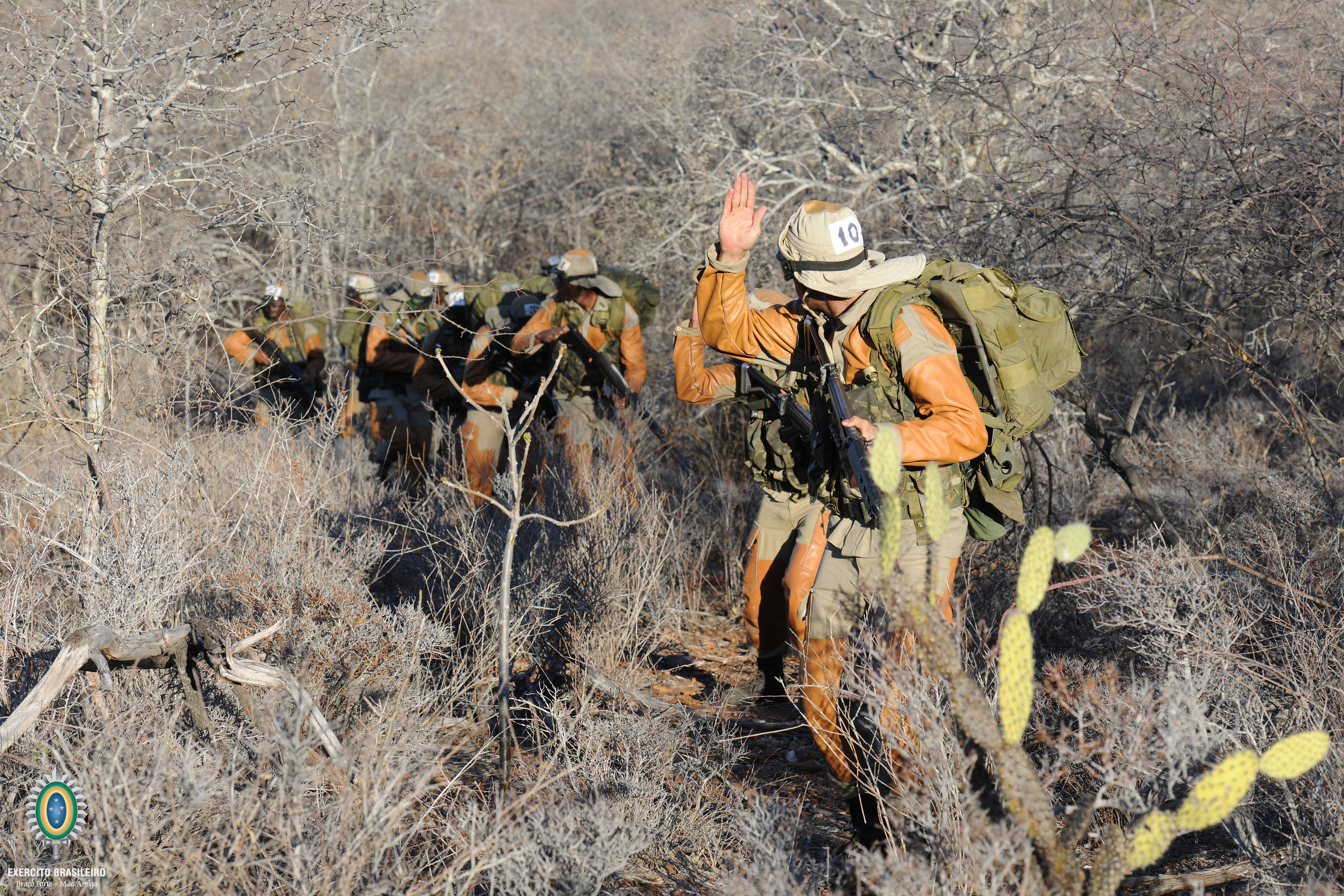
Brazilian soldiers of the 72.º Batalhão de Infantaria training in the caatinga. Note the spike protective Jibão clothing for the region.

The drought usually ends in December or January, when the rainy season starts. Immediately after the first rains, the grey, desert-like landscape starts to transform and becomes completely green within a few days. Small plants start growing in the now moist soil and trees grow back their leaves. Rivers that are mostly dry during the past six or seven months start to fill up and streams begin to flow again.

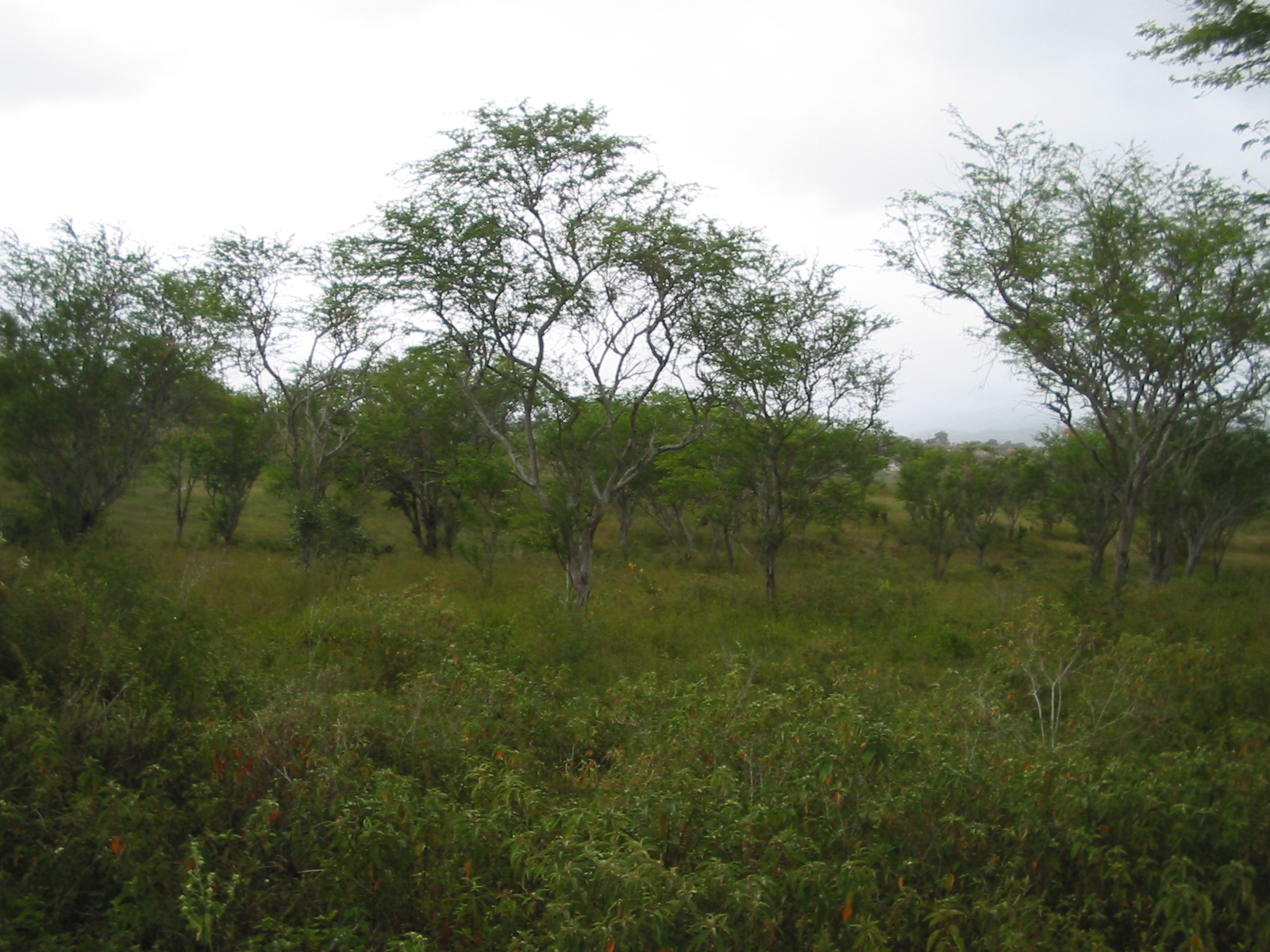
Caatinga during the rainy season.

== Ecology ==
The Caatinga harbors a unique biota. To date, between 932 - 1,000 vascular plant species, 187 species of bees, 240 species of fish, 167 reptile and amphibian species, 510 bird species across 62 families, and 148 mammal species have been recorded in the Caatinga, with endemism levels varying from 9 percent in birds to 57 percent in fishes. The true proportion of endemic species of the Caatinga may be higher than is currently known, as 80% of surveyed areas were surveyed poorly, and 41% of the region has never been surveyed by scientists at all.

=== Vegetation ===
The Caatinga does not correspond to a single type of vegetation, but rather a broad mosaic. Nonetheless, all vegetative structure is adapted to the xeric climate. Succulent and crassulaceous species dominate; non-succulents exhibit small, firm leaves and intense branching at the base, akin to shrubs. Palm stands usually contain carnaúba or babaçu palms, but occasionally tucumã and macaúba.

The Caatinga has enough endemic species to constitute a floristic province.

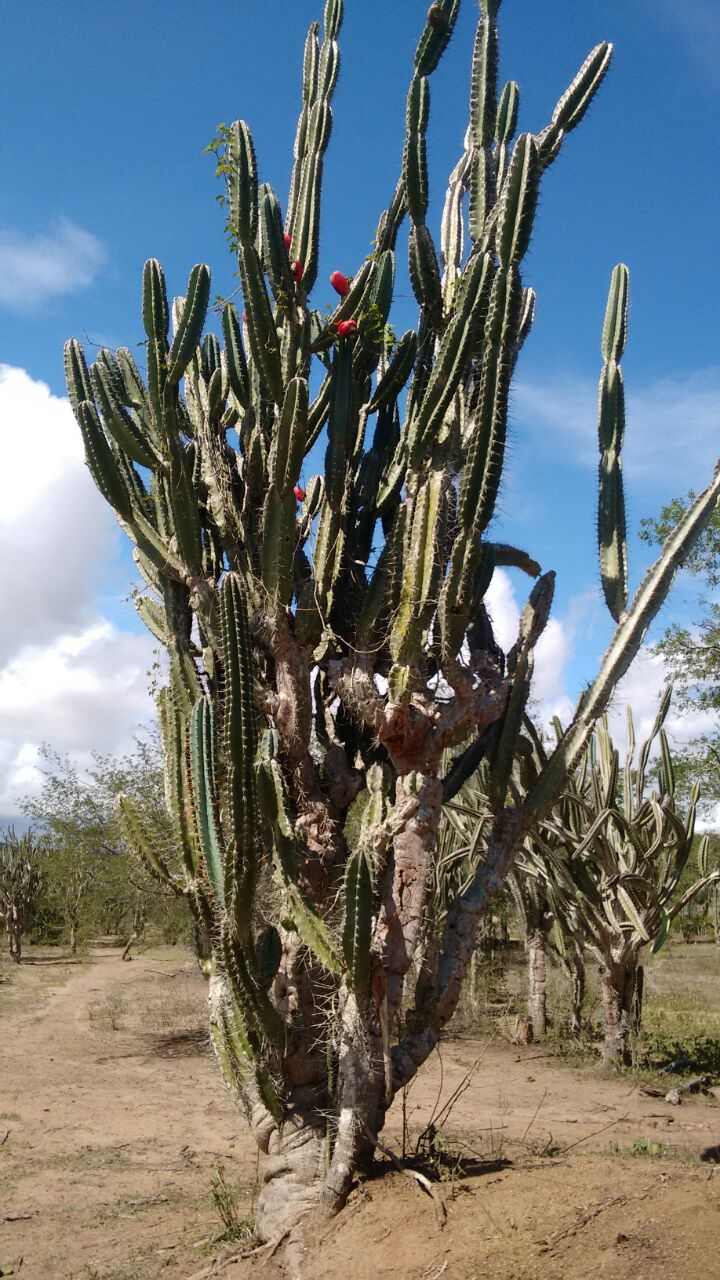
Cereus jamacaru

Most authors divide the Caatinga into two different subtypes: dry ("sertão") and humid ("agreste"), but categorizations vary to as many as eight different vegetative regimes.

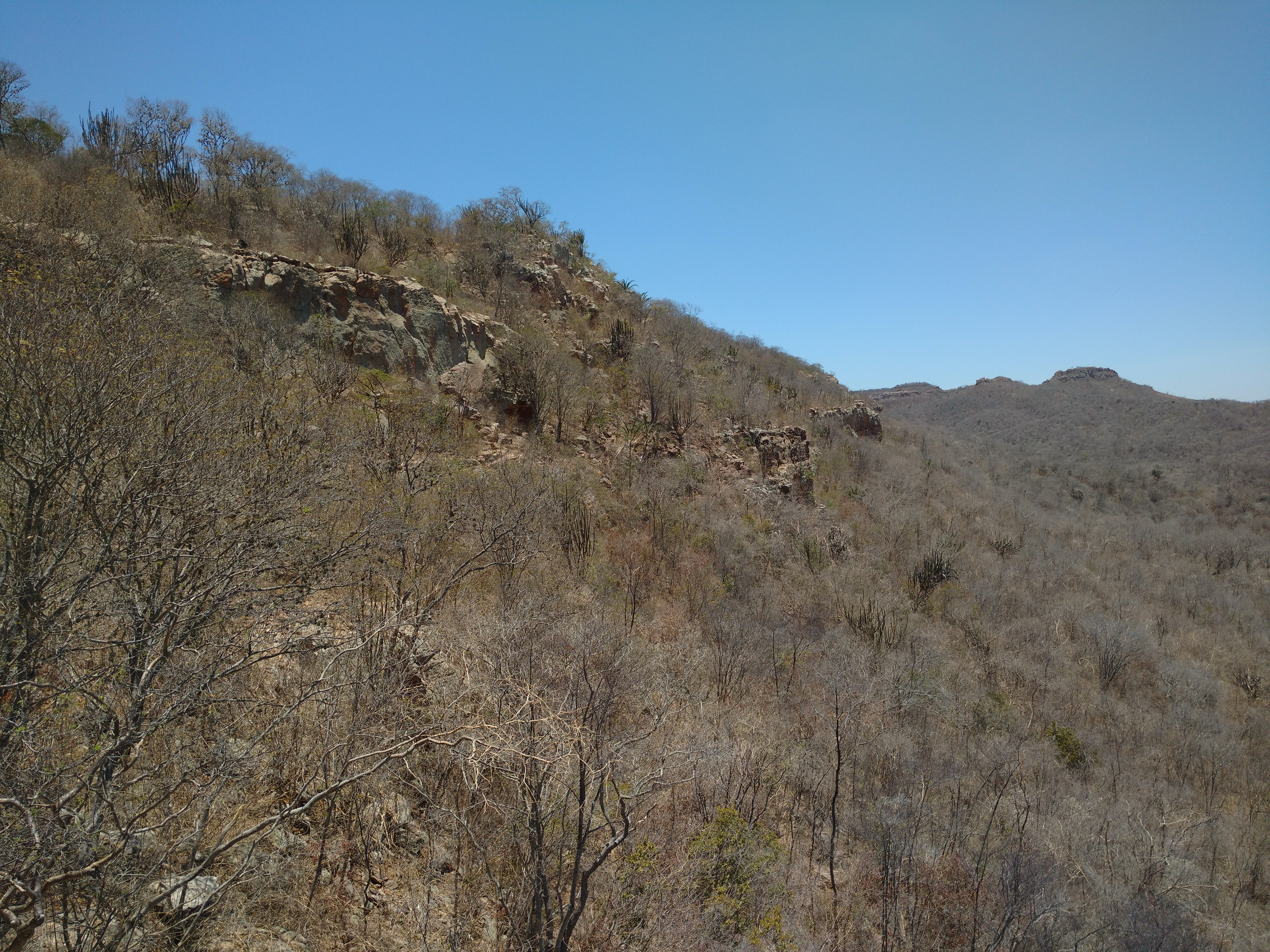
Caatinga landscape.

=== Fauna ===
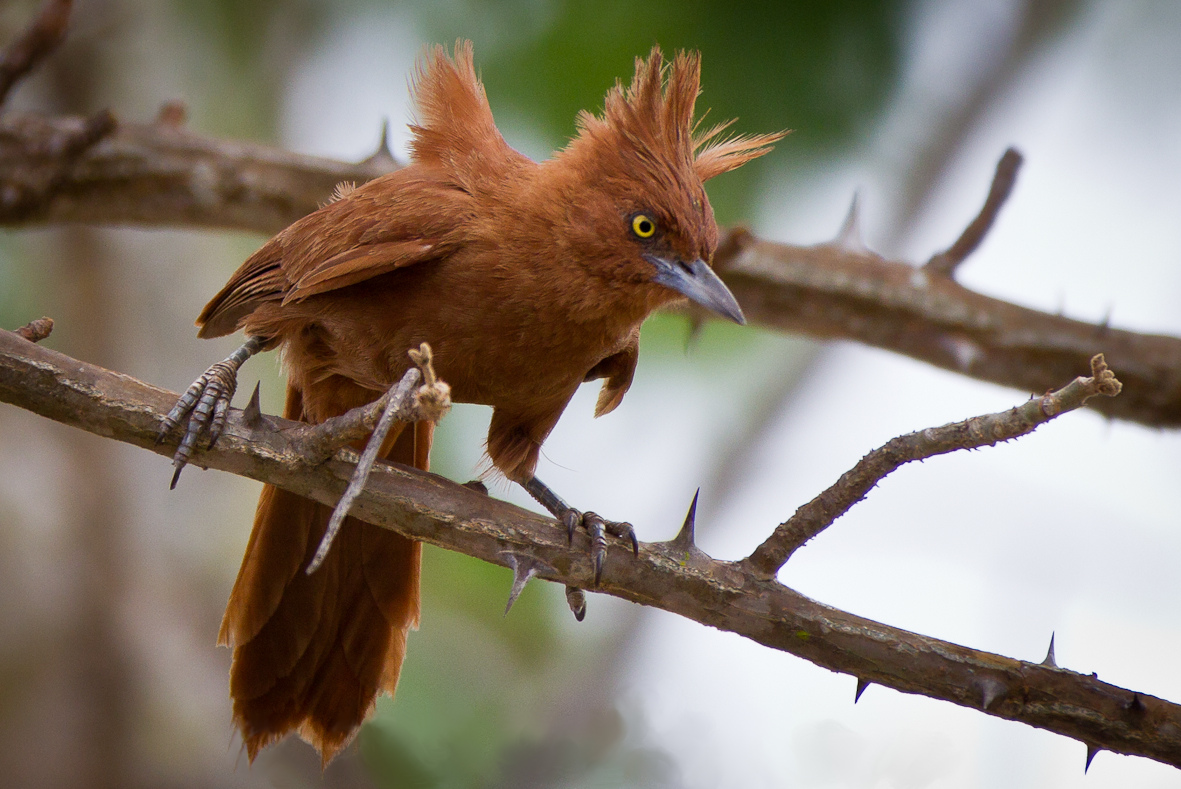
Pseudoseisura cristata, an endemic species.

The Caatinga is home to nearly 50 endemic species of birds, including Lear's macaw (Anodorhynchus leari), Spix's macaw (Cyanopsitta spixii), (Note: Now extinct.) moustached woodcreeper (Xiphocolaptes falcirostris), Caatinga parakeet (Eupsittula cactorum), Caatinga antwren (Radinopsyche sellowi), São Francisco black tyrant (Knipolegus franciscanus) and Caatinga cacholote (Pseudoseisura cristata).

There are also several endemic mammals, including an endemic primate, the blond titi monkey (Callicebus barbarabrownae); an endemic marsupial, Karimi's fat-tailed mouse opossum (Thylamys karimii); an endemic bat, Vieira's long-tongued bat (Xeronycteris vieirai); and several species of endemic rodents such as the Caatinga vesper mouse (Calomys expulsus), Yonenaga's Atlantic spiny-rat (Trinomys yonenagae), and the white-spined Atlantic spiny rat (both the nominal subspecies Trinomys albispinus minor and T. a. sertonius), and the red-nosed mouse (Wiedomys pyrrhorhinos).

=== Indigenous peoples ===
The oldest human remains in the Caatinga are found in the Serra da Capivara National Park, in Piauí, where artifacts, rock paintings, and a skull named "Zuzu" were discovered, dating back approximately 8,000 years. This fossil, under study, may be even older than the Luzia fossil, which is currently the oldest in the South American continent.

The caatinga was inhabited by two major indigenous groups, the Macro-Jê and the Kariris, who have been in the Caatinga for at least two thousand years. After the 11th century, the Tupis arrived in the region, coming from the southeast and through the Atlantic coast. Contact with colonizers starting in the 16th century decimated numerous indigenous nations and tribes through diseases, enslavement, and invasion of territories for cattle ranching, sugar mills, and new settlements. Many of the Northeastern indigenous peoples chose assimilation, abandoning their customs, language, and religion to survive European advances, so many Northeasterners are mixed descendants of indigenous peoples and Europeans.

Currently, the Caatinga still has indigenous peoples, the largest of which are the Potyguaras, of Tupi origin and also native to the Atlantic Forest, totaling more than 20,000 indigenous peoples. In the interior, the largest groups are the Xukurus and Pankarus, from the Pernambuco Caatinga, totaling 12,000 and 7,000 indigenous peoples, possibly of Macro-Jê origin. The Fulni-Ô people are known for being the only indigenous ethnic group in the Northeast to have kept their ancestral language alive, as well as having saved unique cultural elements such as the Ouricuri Ritual; they are one of the least acculturated Northeastern peoples by European invaders. Other notable Caatinga peoples are the Kambiwás, Tremembés, Pitaguarys, Kariris, Kiriris, and Tabajaras.

=== Possible anthropogenic origins ===
Based on radiocarbon dating of potsherds, proponents of historical ecology such as William Denevan and William Balee have suggested that large sections of the Caatinga region may be of anthropogenic origin. Over 1,000 years ago, native peoples may have unintentionally created the environment of the modern-day Caatinga through constant slash-and-burn agriculture, thereby stymying plant succession and preventing major rainforests from growing within the region.

Conversely, fossil evidence suggests that the Caatinga may historically have been part of a much larger dry belt.

== Conservation ==
The Caatinga is poorly represented in the Brazilian Conservation Area network, with only 1% in Integral Protection Conservation Areas and 6% in Sustainable Use Conservation Areas. Protected areas include Chapada Diamantina National Park, Serra da Capivara National Park, and Serra das Confusões National Park.

Economic development has fragmented the native biome. Estimates on the amount of Caatinga transformed affected by economic development range 25-50%, making Caatinga the most degraded ecosystem in Brazil, following the Atlantic Forest, which has lost over 80% of its original cover.

== Economic exploitation ==
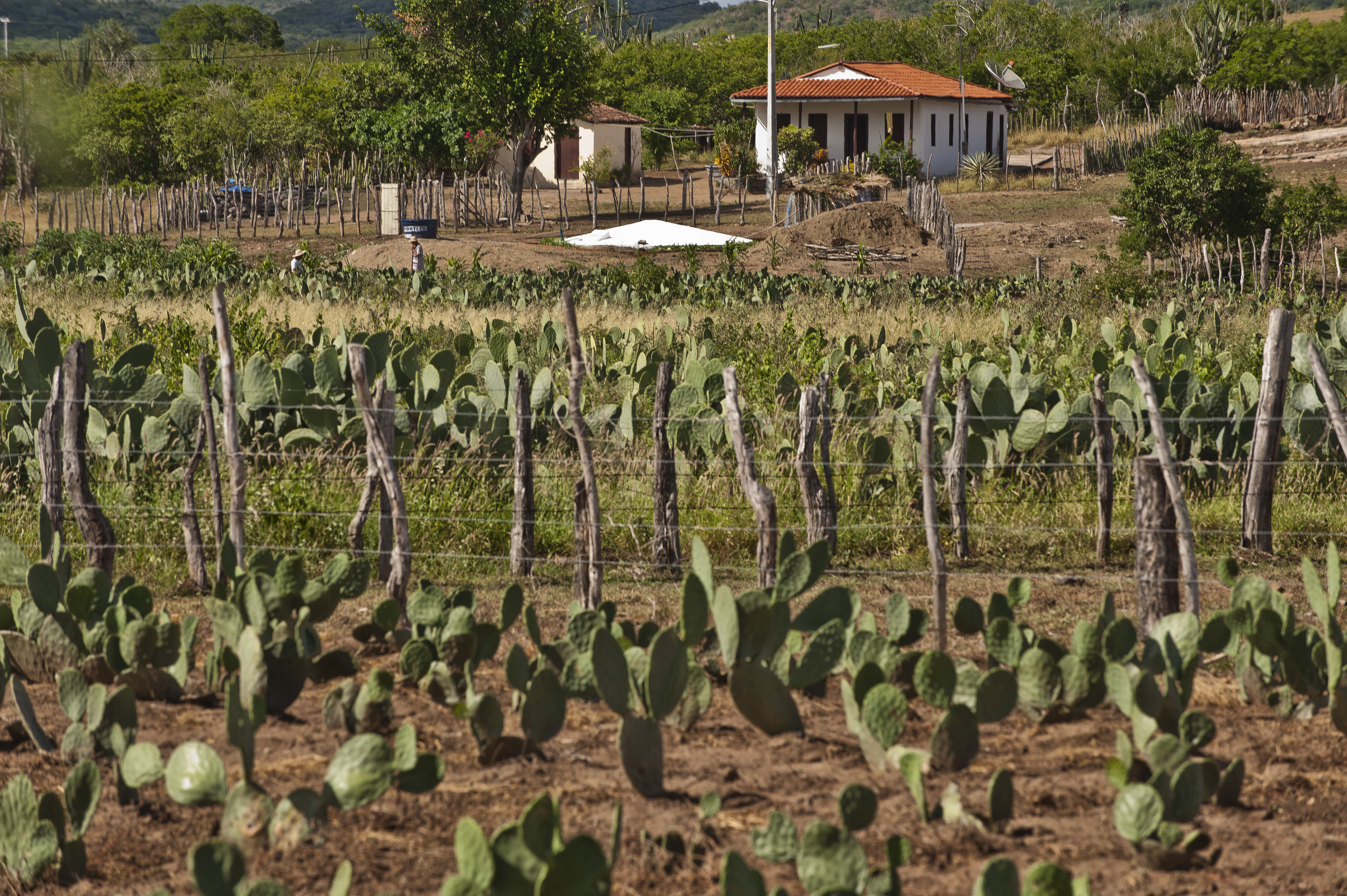
Opuntia spp. (locally known in Portuguese as "palma", actually a cactus, thus not closely related to the family Arecaceae) plantation in the caatinga

The local population lives in extreme poverty, and many rely on extraction of natural resources for a livelihood. There are few drinkable water sources, and harvesting is difficult because of the irregular rainfall.

=== Agriculture ===
Native plants are used in local agriculture, much of it slash-and-burn. Pilocarpus jaborandi appears to exhibit medicinal properties. The fruits of umbú and mangabá are used as food directly, and other species are used for forage. Local palms produce commercial-grade lauric and oleic oils, which undergirds much of the economy of northeast Brazil.

Meliponiculture is also a well-developed and traditional activity in the region. One of the most productive species, Melipona subnitida, known locally as jandaíra, produces up to 6 liters of honey a year, resulting in economic profit for the population.

Irrigation along the São Francisco River enables larger-scale agriculture, with existing irrigation infrastructure supporting the cultivation and export of grapes, papayas and melons in the São Francisco Valley region. Although the soil is fertile, saline water and salt pans near the water table mean that salinization of soil due to irrigation is a significant ongoing concern.

=== Grazing ===
Cattle (Guzerá and Red Sindhi cattle) and goat farming are popular and very productive in the region. Overgrazing and timbering for fuelwood have decimated local vegetative populations; outside irrigated regions, the area has begun to desertify à la Sahara and Sahel.

== See also ==
=== On Caatinga ===
- Caatinga moist-forest enclaves
- Northeastern Brazil
- Sertão
- List of plants of Caatinga vegetation of Brazil

=== The five other major ecoregions of Brazil ===
- Amazon Basin
- Pantanal
- Cerrado
- Atlantic Forest
- Pampas
