= Huanchaca mouse =

Conservation status
- Data Deficient (IUCN 3.1)

Scientific classification
- Kingdom: Animalia
- Phylum: Chordata
- Class: Mammalia
- Order: Rodentia
- Family: Cricetidae
- Subfamily: Sigmodontinae
- Genus: Juscelinomys
- Species: J. huanchacae

Binomial name
- Juscelinomys huanchacae Emmons, 1999

Species of rodent

The Huanchaca mouse or Huanchaca akodont (Juscelinomys huanchacae) is a rodent species in the family Cricetidae. It is known from savannas in an area at an elevation of 700 metres (2,300 ft) in Serrania Huanchaca, Noel Kempff Mercado National Park in eastern Bolivia.

== Description ==
The Huanchaca mouse is a fairly uniform olive-brown colour, the pelage being about 12 mm (0.5 in) in length along the spine. The individual hairs on the back and flanks have grey bases, dark shafts and either black or yellowish tips. The ventral pelage is grey or yellowish buff. The sides of the muzzle and the chin are pale and the ears are well clad with short, pale-tipped hairs and fringed with pale-coloured hairs. The feet are clad with dark hairs with whitish tips. The tail is well-covered with stiff, dark-coloured hairs on the upper surface and paler hairs underneath.

== Distribution and habitat ==
This mouse is endemic to eastern Bolivia. It has a rather small range, with 117 km (73 mi) between the most widely separated of the four localities from which it is known, all of which are in Noel Kempff Mercado National Park. The type locality is in wet, tussocky savanna with scattered dwarf trees on the Huanchaca Plateau at 700 m (2,300 ft). Other localities include better-drained grassland with shrubs and trees on the slopes below the plateau at 200 m (660 ft).

== Ecology ==
The Huanchaca mouse feeds on invertebrates, such as ants and insect larvae, and on some plant material. Females are often pregnant or lactating in the late dry season or at the start of the rainy season, but it may breed over a longer period as little sampling has taken place at other times of year. Litter sizes range from one to three. This mouse is quite easy to trap in a Sherman trap, but seems very prone to shed its tail, with many specimens having short tails or stumps. There seem to be large population swings; for example, in one location, the previously-present animal apparently disappeared for three years before reappearing. Such changes in population size may lead to local extinctions.

== Status ==
The International Union for Conservation of Nature (IUCN) has described the conservation status of this species as "data deficient", because there is insufficient information available to make a proper assessment. The rough grassland where it occurs is threatened by cattle grazing, and some surrounding areas are being cultivated for the production of biofuels, putting the future of this mouse at risk.

== External sources ==
- Animal Diversity Web
