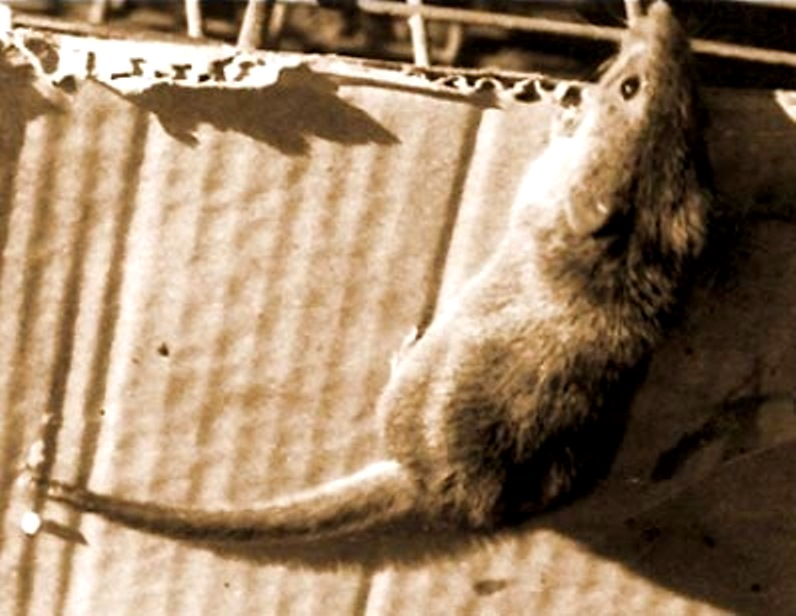

Conservation status
- Extinct (IUCN 3.1)

Scientific classification
- Kingdom: Animalia
- Phylum: Chordata
- Class: Mammalia
- Order: Rodentia
- Family: Cricetidae
- Subfamily: Sigmodontinae
- Genus: Juscelinomys
- Species: †J. candango

Binomial name
- †Juscelinomys candango Moojen, 1965

Synonyms
- Juscelinomys talpinus Winge, 1887

= Candango mouse =

Extinct species of rodent

The candango mouse or candango akodont (Juscelinomys candango) is an extinct rodent species from South America. It was found around Brasília until the 1960s when its habitat was overtaken by urban sprawl and it is now presumed extinct.

The candango mouse is dark in coloration with individual gray hairs sticking out of its fur with orange or black tips giving it red streaks with dark coloration. It has small ears that are completely haired on both external and internal surfaces, and it has a short tail that gets wider towards the base and is covered in hair.
