= Soft-spined Atlantic spiny rat =

Conservation status
- Least Concern (IUCN 3.1)

Scientific classification
- Kingdom: Animalia
- Phylum: Chordata
- Class: Mammalia
- Order: Rodentia
- Family: Echimyidae
- Subfamily: Euryzygomatomyinae
- Genus: Trinomys
- Species: T. dimidiatus

Binomial name
- Trinomys dimidiatus (Günther, 1877)
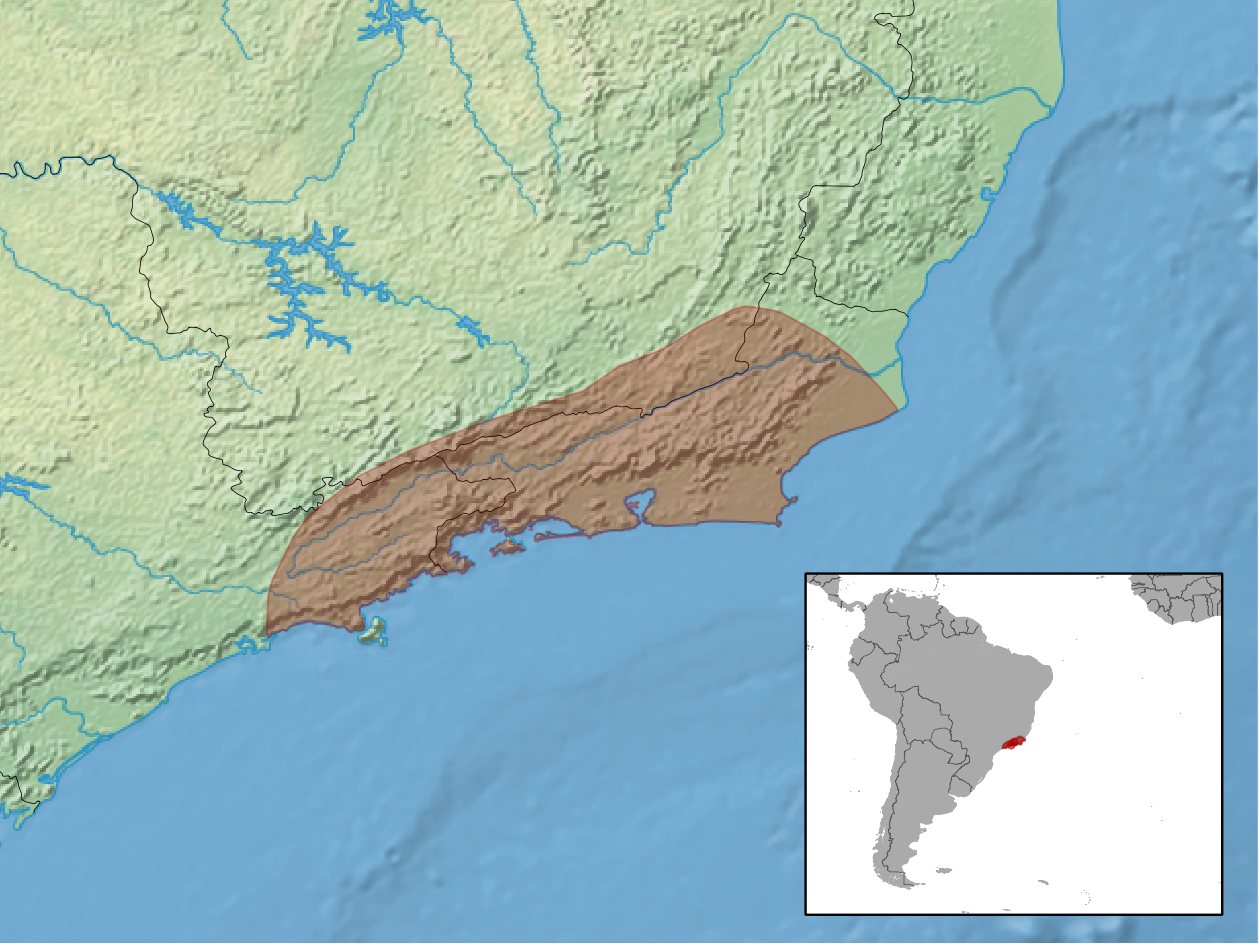

Synonyms
- Proechimys dimidiatus

Species of rodent

The soft-spined Atlantic spiny rat (Trinomys dimidiatus) is a spiny rat species from South America. It is endemic to Brazil.
