= Hairy Atlantic spiny rat =

Conservation status
- Least Concern (IUCN 3.1)

Scientific classification
- Kingdom: Animalia
- Phylum: Chordata
- Class: Mammalia
- Order: Rodentia
- Family: Echimyidae
- Subfamily: Euryzygomatomyinae
- Genus: Trinomys
- Species: T. setosus

Binomial name
- Trinomys setosus (Desmarest, 1817)

Subspecies
- T. s. denigratus (Moojen, 1948); T. s. elegans (Lund, 1841); T. s. setosus (Desmarest, 1817)
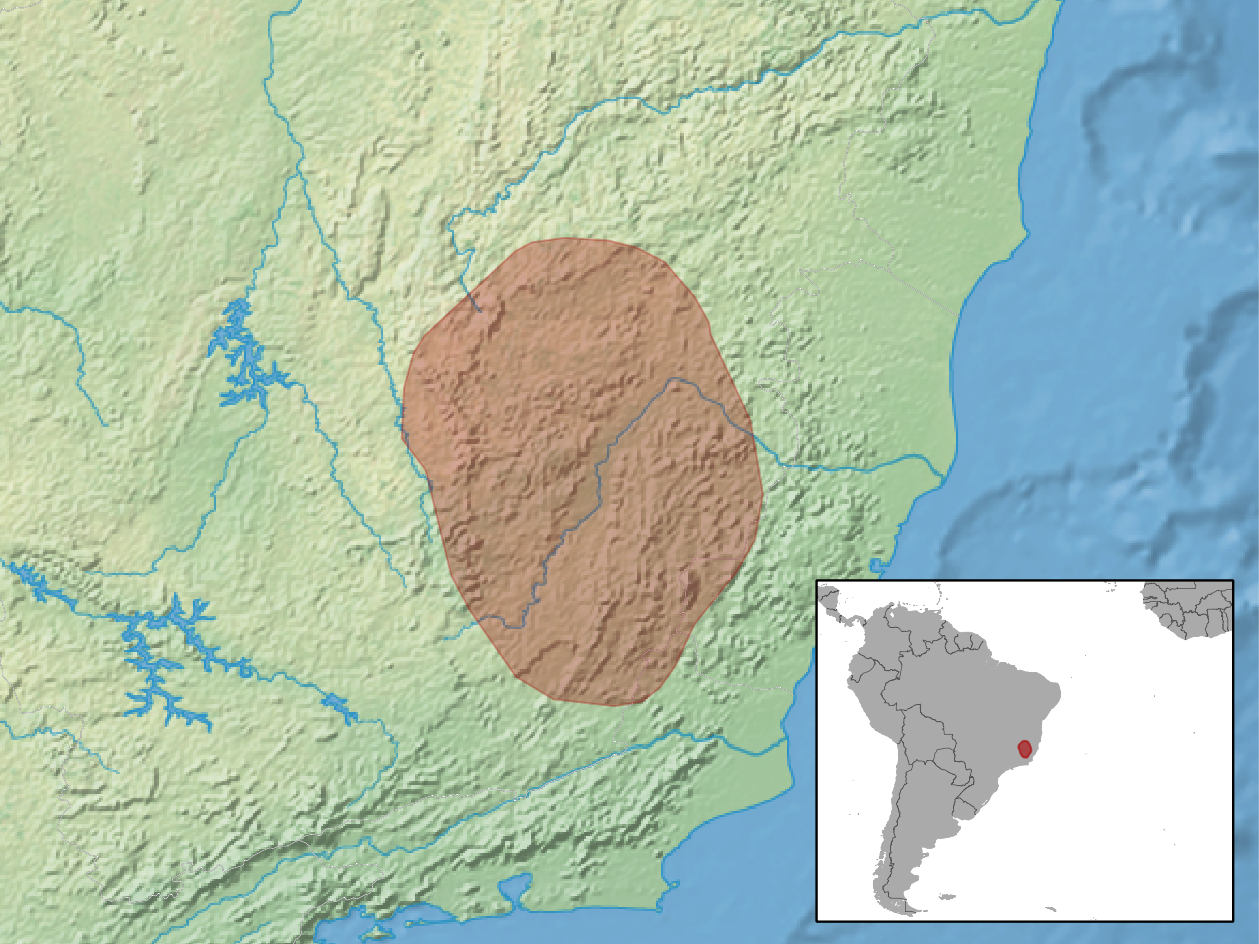

Synonyms
- Proechimys setosus

Species of rodent

The hairy Atlantic spiny rat (Trinomys setosus) is a spiny rat species from South America.

== Taxonomy ==
Anselme Gaëtan Desmarest described it in 1817 as Proechimys setosus. It was moved to Trinomys by Lara and Patton in 2000.

== Description ==
It is a medium-large rat, with a head and body length averaging 204 millimetres (8.0 in) and a 209 millimetres (8.2 in) tail. The fur on the back is "brownish-olive to cinnamon", gradually paling to white on the stomach. The tail has a brown base and white tip, with a tuft of hair at the end.

They have 56 pairs of chromosomes. A 2022 genetic analysis found that within Trinomys, T. setosus is most closely related to T. yonengae, and they may have separated approximately 8 million years ago.

The species is endemic to Brazil, and can be found in Sergipe, Bahia, Minas Gerais, Espírito Santo, and Rio de Janeiro. Its habitat includes forest and savanna. It is likely nocturnal.

The IUCN list T. setosus as a species of least concern due to its wide distribution and local abundance.
