= Elias's Atlantic spiny rat =

Elias' Atlantic spiny-rat

Conservation status
- Near Threatened (IUCN 3.1)

Scientific classification
- Kingdom: Animalia
- Phylum: Chordata
- Class: Mammalia
- Infraclass: Placentalia
- Order: Rodentia
- Family: Echimyidae
- Subfamily: Euryzygomatomyinae
- Genus: Trinomys
- Species: T. eliasi

Binomial name
- Trinomys eliasi (Pessoa and dos Reis, 1993)
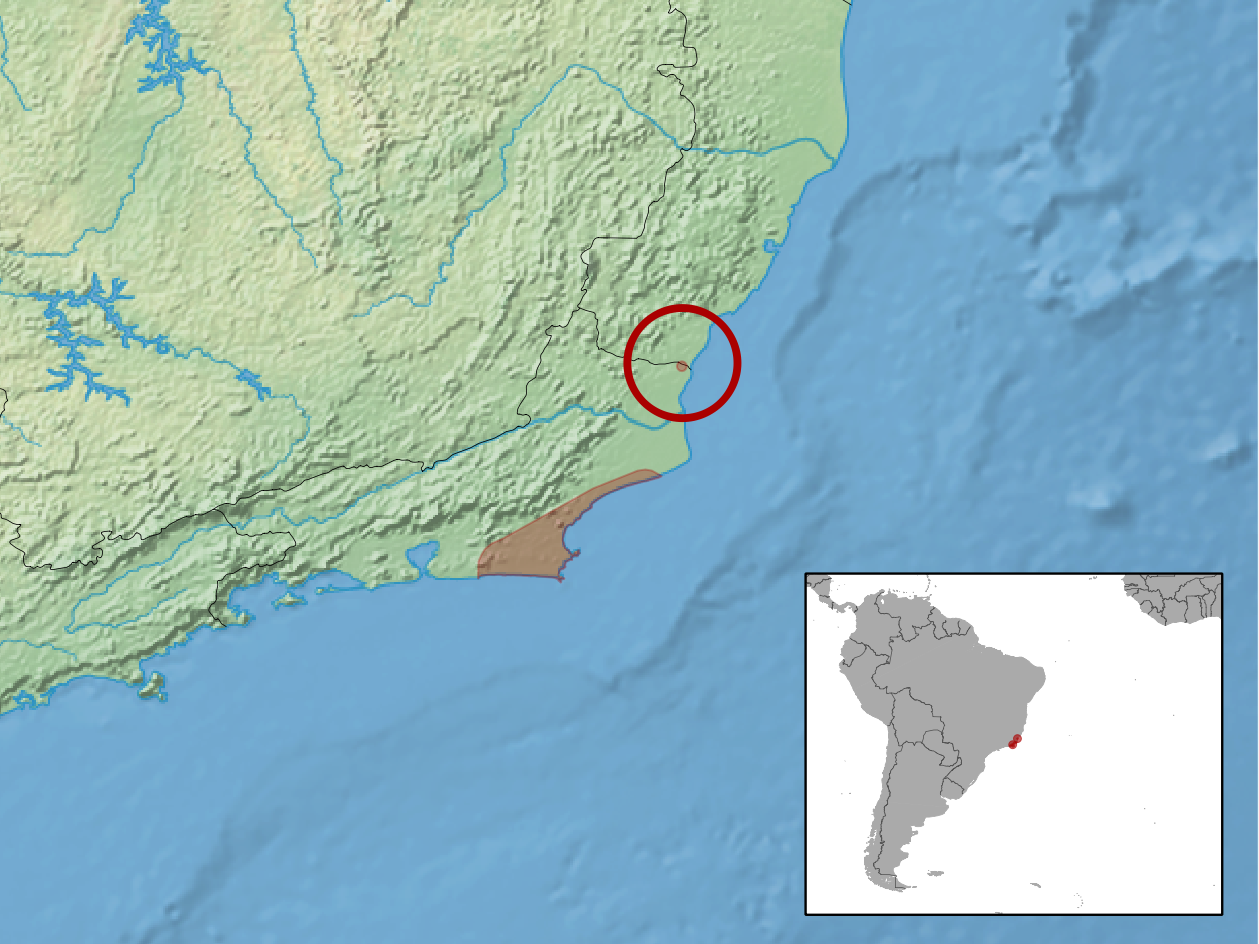

Species of rodent

Elias's Atlantic spiny-rat or the Rio de Janeiro spiny rat (Trinomys eliasi), is a spiny rat species from South America. It is found in Brazil.
