= Spiked Atlantic spiny rat =

Spiked Atlantic spiny-rat

Conservation status
- Data Deficient (IUCN 3.1)

Scientific classification
- Kingdom: Animalia
- Phylum: Chordata
- Class: Mammalia
- Order: Rodentia
- Family: Echimyidae
- Subfamily: Euryzygomatomyinae
- Genus: Trinomys
- Species: T. paratus

Binomial name
- Trinomys paratus Moojen, 1948
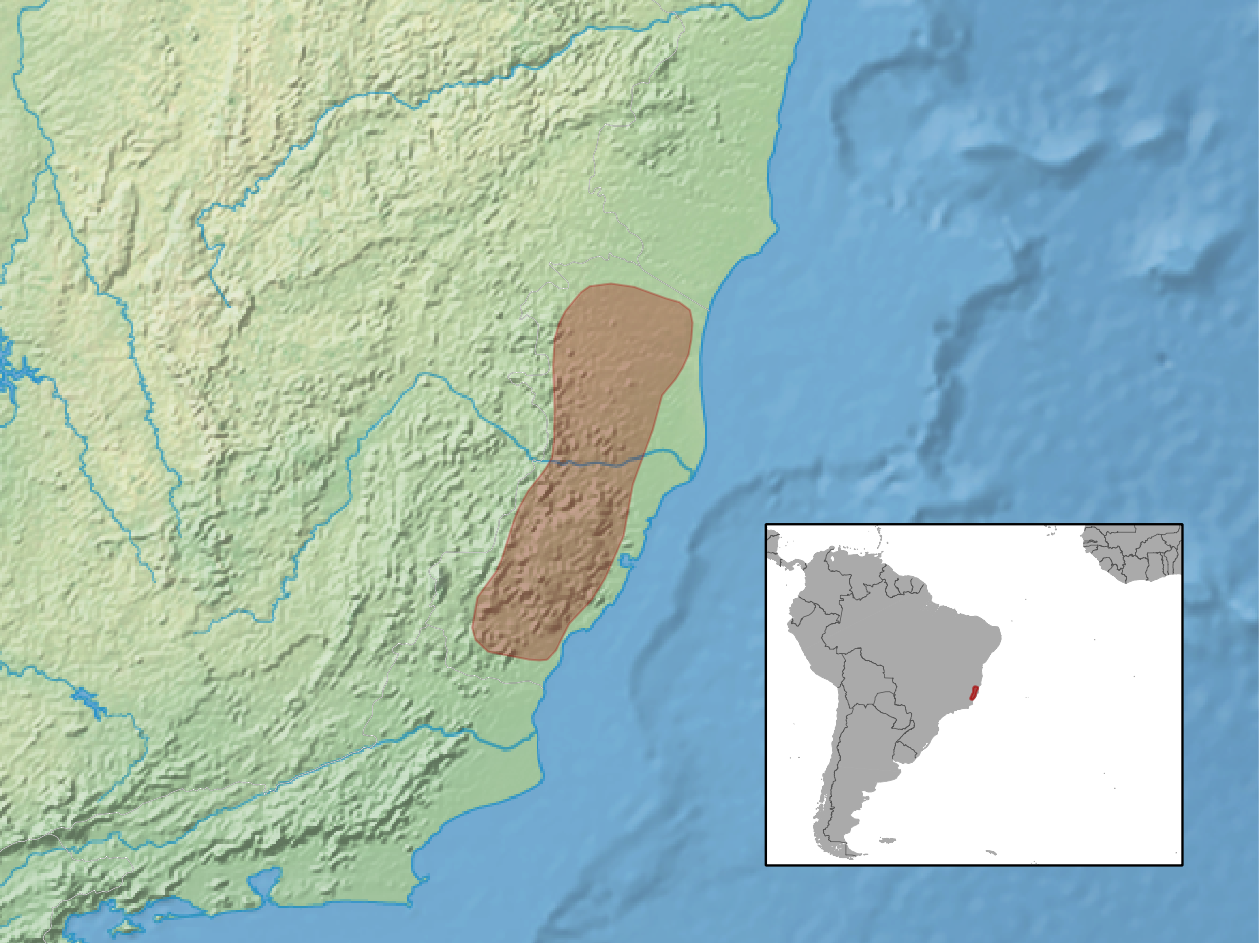

Species of rodent

The spiked Atlantic spiny-rat or Espirito Santo spiny rat (Trinomys paratus), is a spiny rat species from South America. It is found in Brazil.
