= Gracile Atlantic spiny rat =

Conservation status
- Least Concern (IUCN 3.1)

Scientific classification
- Kingdom: Animalia
- Phylum: Chordata
- Class: Mammalia
- Order: Rodentia
- Family: Echimyidae
- Subfamily: Euryzygomatomyinae
- Genus: Trinomys
- Species: T. gratiosus

Binomial name
- Trinomys gratiosus (Moojen, 1948)

Subspecies
- T. g. bonafidei (Moojen, 1948); T. g. gratiosus (Moojen, 1948)
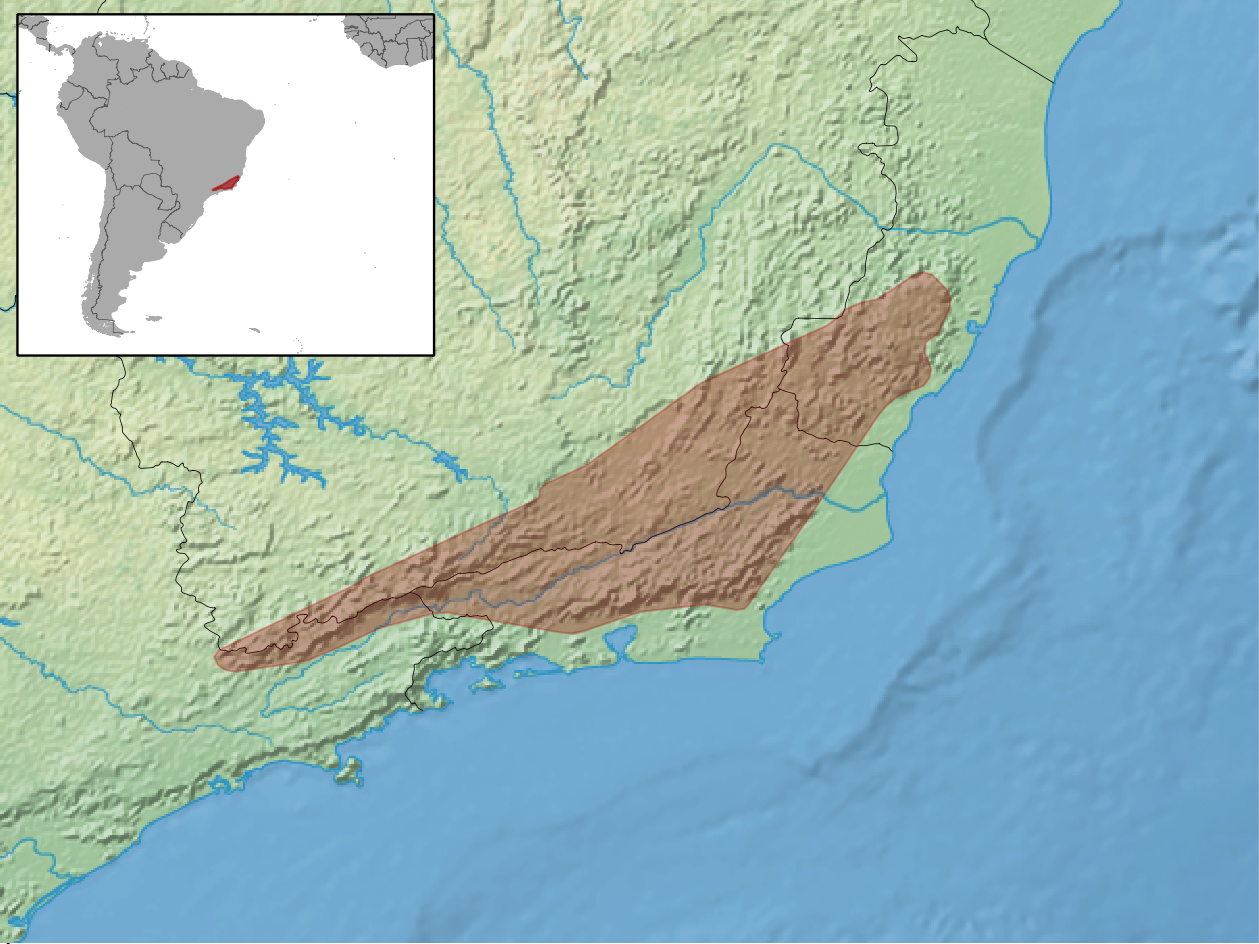

Species of rodent

Trinomys gratiosus is a species in the mainly South American family Echimyidae, the spiny rats; it occurs in southeast Brazil from the south bank of the River Doce, Espirito Sante, southward to Teresopolis, Rio de Janeiro.

== Taxonomy ==
Recently published studies suggest that the taxonomy of the genus Trinomys as currently described is not yet stable and that the genus might well be split. Some evidence suggests that the lineage of the South American spiny rats is older than might have been expected and in spite of morphological resemblance, the populations have diverged widely.

== Status ==
In 2008 the IUCN Red List rated Trinomys gratiosus as Least Concern (LC); its population is apparently large, it does not seem to be declining fast enough for listing in a threatened category, and the habitat is not under obvious threat.

== Common name ==
The species does not occur and is not widely known in Anglophone regions, so the idea of popular English names raises problems. For example, at least two coined "common names" have been published recently without special authority. Neither is in use in the local vernacular where the species is endemic, and neither is a valid derivation of the species name. "Gracile Atlantic spiny-rat" is inappropriate because the word gracile has nothing to do with the meaning or etymology of the Latin "gratiosus". A rival name, "graceful spiny-rat", is no better justified; "gratiosus" specifically means either "enjoying favour, favoured, beloved", or "showing favour, complaisant" "a favourite", or at best "gracious", not "graceful". No authority to date has proposed a better option than using the species name, Trinomys gratiosus in English.
