= Sherman trap =

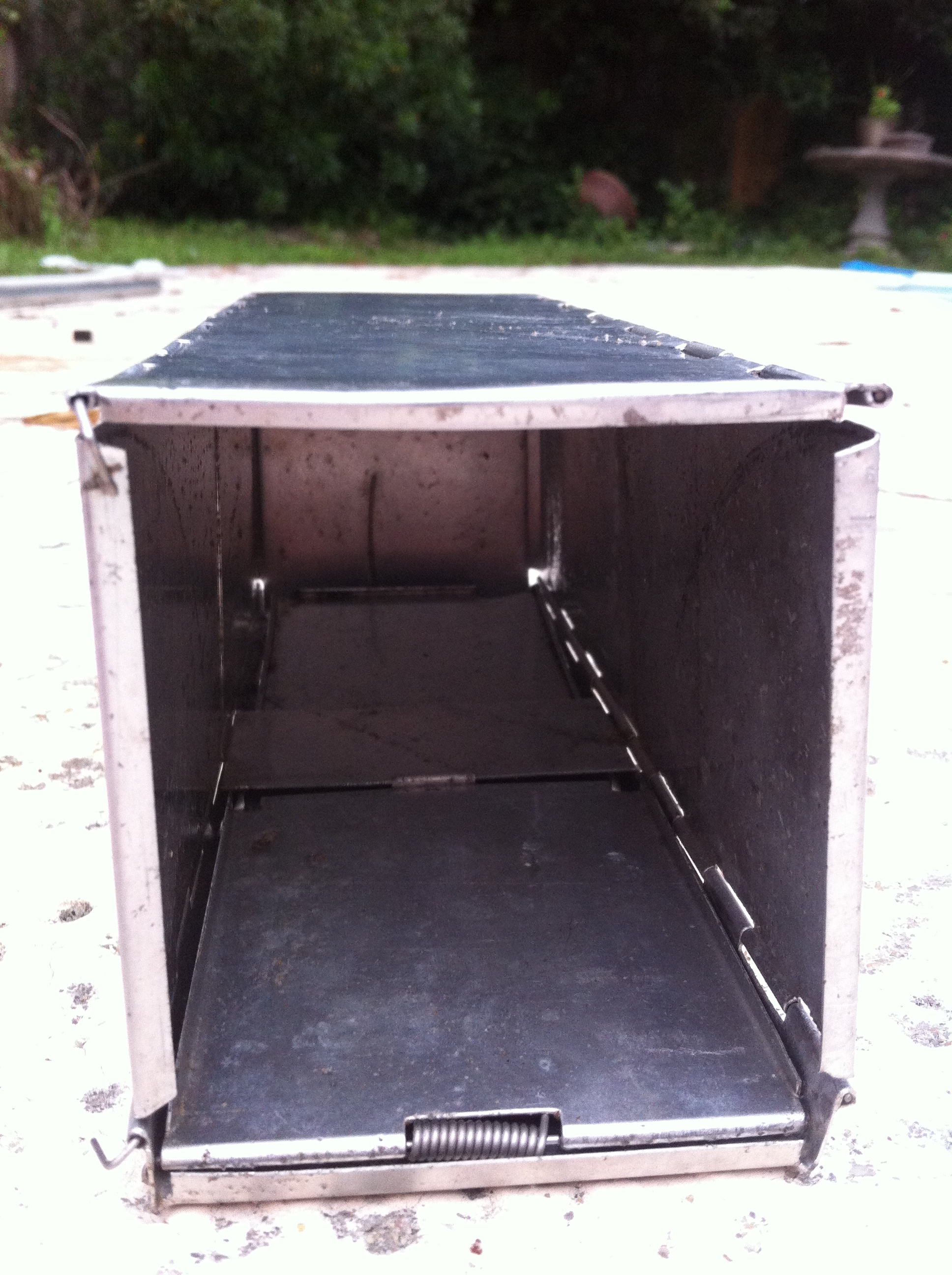
A frontal shot of a Sherman trap.

The Sherman trap is a box-style animal trap designed for the live capture of small mammals. It was invented by Dr. H. B. Sherman in the 1920s and became commercially available in 1955. Since that time, the Sherman trap has been used extensively by researchers in the biological sciences for capturing animals such as mice, voles, shrews, and chipmunks. The Sherman trap consists of eight hinged pieces of sheet metal (either galvanized steel or aluminium) that allow the trap to be collapsed for storage or transport. Sherman traps are often set in grids and may be baited with grains and seed.

== Description ==
The hinged design allows the trap to fold up flat into something only the width of one side panel. This makes it compact for storage and easy to transport to field locations (e.g. in a back pack). Both ends are hinged, but in normal operation the rear end is closed and the front folds inwards and latches the treadle, trigger plate, in place. When an animal enters far enough to be clear of the front door, their weight releases the latch and the door closes behind them.

The lure or bait is placed at the far end and can be dropped in place through the rear hinged door.

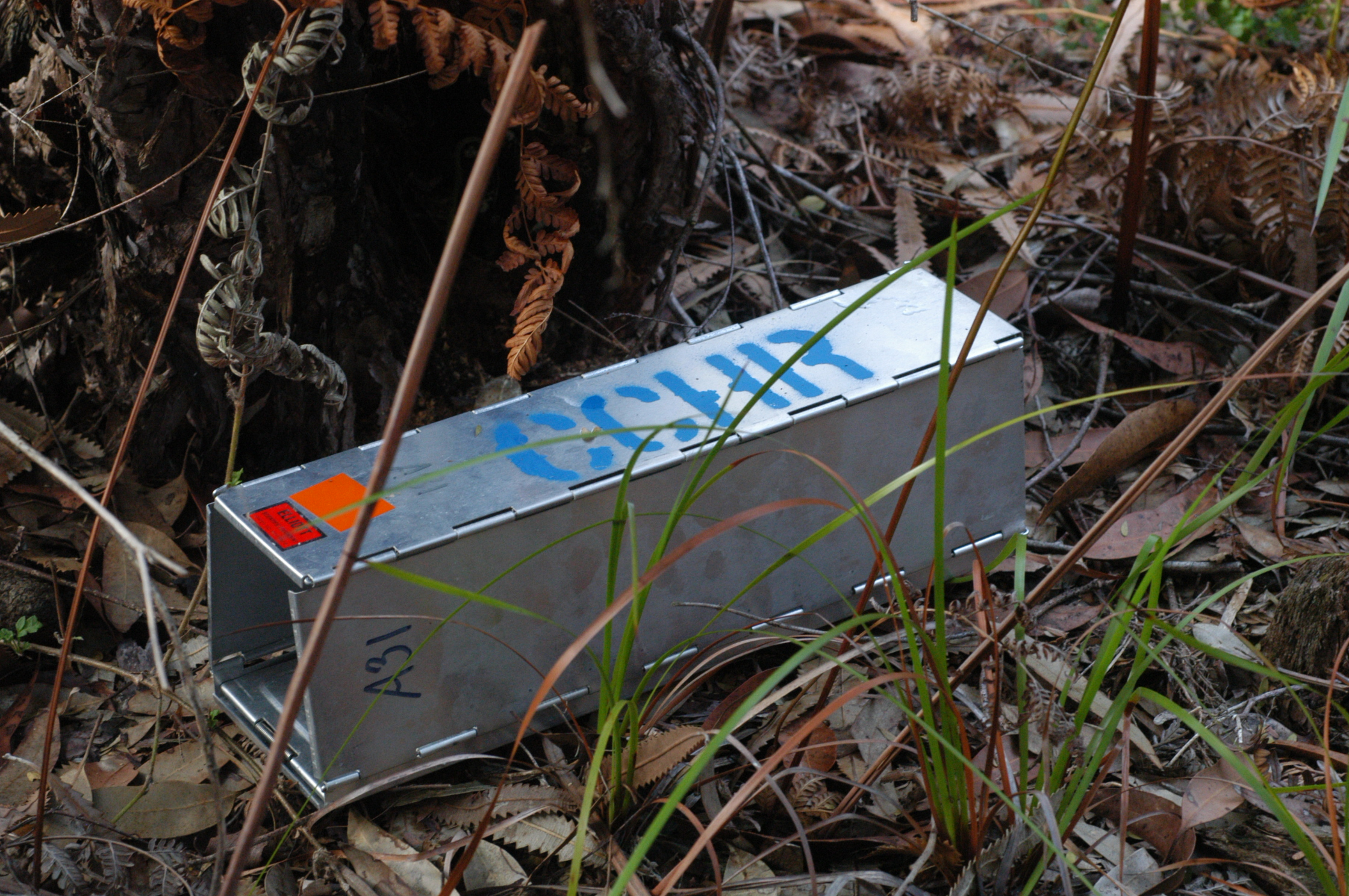
A modified design (Elliott), deployed in the field

=== Variants ===
Later, other variants that built upon the basic design, appeared - such as the Elliott trap used in Europe and Australasia. The Elliott trap has simplified the design slightly and is made from just seven hinged panels.
