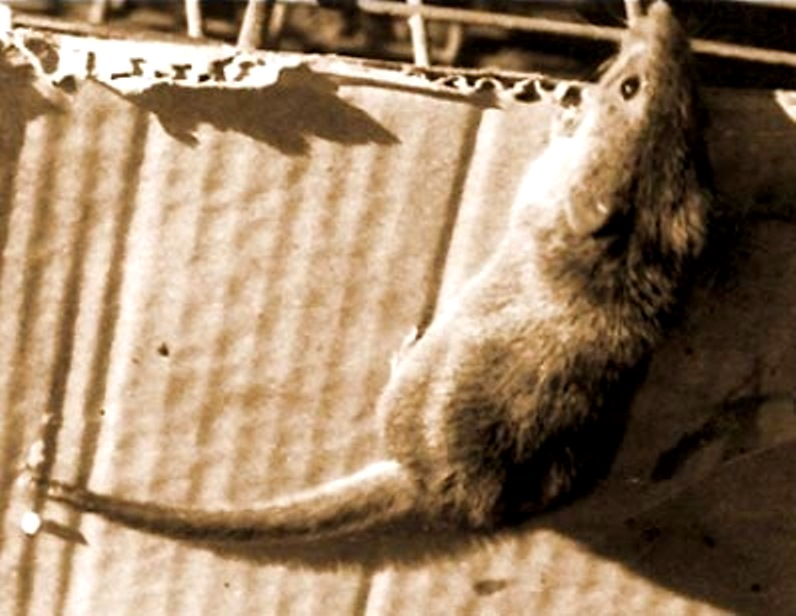
- Jusceliomys candango

Scientific classification
- Domain: Eukaryota
- Kingdom: Animalia
- Phylum: Chordata
- Class: Mammalia
- Order: Rodentia
- Family: Cricetidae
- Subfamily: Sigmodontinae
- Tribe: Akodontini
- Genus: Juscelinomys; Moojen, 1965

Type species
- Juscelinomys candango

Species
- †Juscelinomys candango Juscelinomys guaporensis Juscelinomys huanchacae

= Juscelinomys =

Burrowing mice Temporal range: Pleistocene - Recent

Genus of rodents

Juscelinomys is a genus of burrowing mice. The name is derived from Brazilian president Juscelino Kubitschek who created the city of Brasília where the Brasília burrowing mouse was discovered.

There are two living species:

- †J. candango Candango mouse
- J. guaporensis Rio Guaporé mouse
- J. huanchacae Huanchaca mouse

A fourth species, J. talpinus, is known only from subfossil remains. Some authorities treat it as a distinct species or a senior synonym for one or all species in Juscelinomys.
