= List of mammals of Desengano State Park =

These are the mammals known to occur in the Desengano State Park in the state of Rio de Janeiro in Brazil. When the exact species present is unknown, only the genus is given.

== Infraclass: Eutheria ==
=== Order: Chiroptera ===
- Family: Vespertilionidae
  - Genus: Lasiurus
    - Desert red bat, Lasiurus blossevillii
    - Southern yellow bat, Lasiurus ega
  - Genus: Myotis
    - Black myotis, Myotis nigricans
- Family: Phyllostomidae
  - Genus: Anoura
    - Tailed tailless bat, Anoura caudifer
    - Geoffroy's tailless bat, Anoura geoffroyi
  - Genus: Artibeus
    - Fringed fruit-eating bat, Artibeus fimbriatus
    - Great fruit-eating bat, Artibeus lituratus
  - Genus: Carollia
    - Seba's short-tailed bat, Carollia perspicillata
  - Genus: Chrotopterus
    - Big-eared woolly bat, Chrotopterus auritus
  - Genus: Desmodus
    - Common vampire bat, Desmodus rotundus
  - Genus: Platyrrhinus
    - White-lined broad-nosed bat, Platyrrhinus lineatus
    - Recife broad-nosed bat, Platyrrhinus recifinus
  - Genus: Sturnira
    - Little yellow-shouldered bat, Sturnira lilium

=== Order: Primates ===
- Family: Pitheciidae
  - Genus: Callicebus
    - Atlantic titi, Callicebus personatus
- Family: Atelidae
  - Genus: Alouatta
  - Genus: Brachyteles
    - Southern muriqui, Brachyteles arachnoides

=== Rodentia ===
- Family: Sciuridae
  - Genus: Sciurus
    - Ingram's squirrel, Sciurus ingrami
- Family: Cricetidae
  - Genus: Akodon
    - Serra do Mar grass mouse, Akodon serrensis
  - Genus: Cerradomys
    - Terraced rice rat, Cerradomys subflavus
  - Genus: Delomys
    - Striped Atlantic Forest rat, Delomys dorsalis
    - Pallid Atlantic Forest rat, Delomys sublineatus
  - Genus: Euryoryzomys
    - Russet rice rat, Euryoryzomys russatus
  - Genus: Hylaeamys
    - Azara's broad-headed oryzomys, Hylaeamys megacephalus
  - Genus: Nectomys
    - Scaly-footed water rat, Nectomys squamipes
  - Genus: Oligoryzomys
    - Black-footed pygmy rice rat, Oligoryzomys nigripes
  - Genus: Oxymycterus
    - Atlantic Forest hocicudo, Oxymycterus dasytrichus
  - Genus: Rhipidomys
  - Genus: Thaptomys
    - Blackish grass mouse, Thaptomys nigrita
- Family: Caviidae
  - Genus: Cavia
- Family: Cuniculidae
  - Genus: Cuniculus
    - Lowland paca, Cuniculus paca
- Family: Dasyproctidae
  - Genus: Dasyprocta
    - Azara's agouti, Dasyprocta azarae
- Family: Erethizontidae
  - Genus: Sphiggurus
- Family: Echimyidae
  - Genus: Euryzygomatomys
    - Fischer's guiara, Euryzygomatomys spinosus
  - Genus: Trinomys
    - Soft-spined Atlantic spiny rat, Trinomys dimidiatus

=== Order: Pilosa ===
- Family: Bradypodidae
  - Genus: Bradypus
    - Brown-throated sloth, Bradypus variegatus

=== Order: Cingulata ===
- Family: Dasypodidae
  - Genus: Cabassous
    - Greater naked-tailed armadillo, Cabassous tatouay
  - Genus: Dasypus
    - Nine-banded armadillo, Dasypus novemcinctus
    - Seven-banded armadillo, Dasypus septemcinctus

=== Order: Carnivora ===
- Family: Felidae
  - Genus: Leopardus
    - Ocelot, Leopardus pardalis
    - Oncilla, Leopardus tigrinus
    - Margay, Leopardus wiedii
- Family: Procyonidae
  - Genus: Nasua
    - South American coati, Nasua nasua
  - Genus: Procyon
    - Crab-eating raccoon, Procyon cancrivorus
- Family: Mustelidae
  - Genus: Eira
    - Tayra, Eira barbara
  - Genus: Lontra
    - Neotropical river otter, Lontra longicaudis

=== Order: Artiodactyla ===
- Family: Tayassuidae
  - Genus: Tayassu
    - White-lipped peccary, Tayassu pecari

== Infraclass: Metatheria ==
=== Order: Didelphimorphia ===
- Family: Didelphidae
  - Genus: Gracilinanus
    - Brazilian gracile opossum, Gracilinanus microtarsus
  - Genus: Metachirus
    - Brown four-eyed opossum, Metachirus nudicaudatus
  - Genus: Marmosops
    - Brazilian slender opossum, Marmosops paulensis
  - Genus: Monodelphis
    - Northern three-striped opossum, Monodelphis americana
  - Genus: Didelphis
    - Big-eared opossum, Didelphis aurita
  - Genus: Philander
    - Southeastern four-eyed opossum, Philander frenatus
