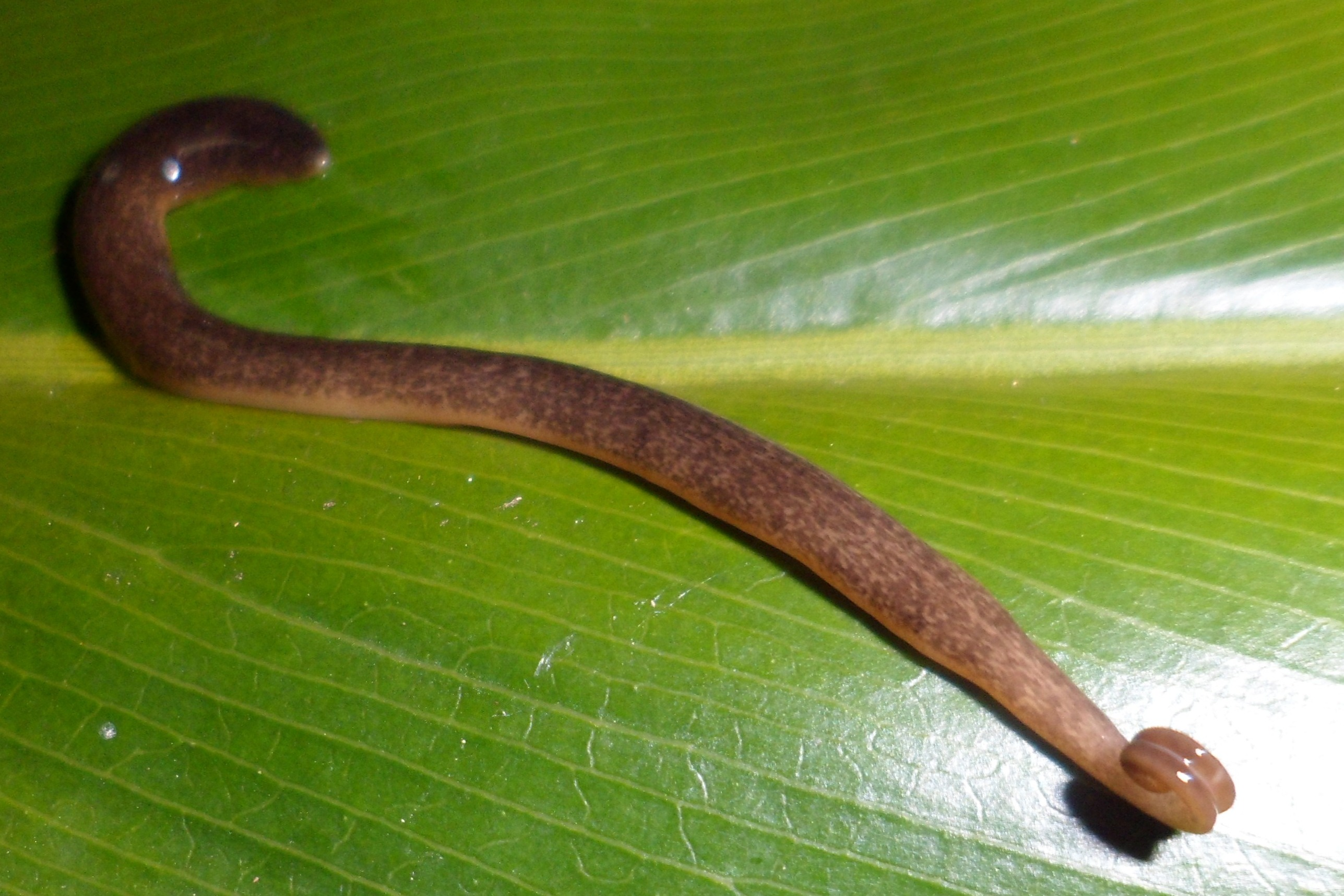
- Head on the bottom right

Scientific classification
- Kingdom: Animalia
- Phylum: Platyhelminthes
- Order: Tricladida
- Family: Geoplanidae
- Genus: Choeradoplana
- Species: C. iheringi

Binomial name
- Choeradoplana iheringi Graff, 1899

= Choeradoplana iheringi =

Species of flatworm

Choeradoplana iheringi is a species of land planarian in the subfamily Geoplaninae found in Brazil.

== Description ==
Choeradoplana iheringi is a small to medium-sized land planarian up to 50 mm (2.0 in) in length when crawling. The dorsum varies from light to medium brown covered by spots of a darker color. A thin median longitudinal stripe may appear in some specimens, formed by the absence of spots on the middle of the body. The venter is light brown. The anterior is constantly rolled backwards due to the presence of a cephalic retractor muscle and has two cushions on the ventral side, separated by a longitudinal groove.

The numerous eyes are distributed marginally along the whole body, except for the apex of the anterior end, where they are absent.

Externally, the darker specimens of C. iheringi are very similar to the related species Choeradoplana benyai, with which they co-occur in southern Brazil.

== Distribution ==
Choeradoplana iheringi is a relatively common species in conserved areas of the Atlantic Forest in Brazil, occurring from Minas Gerais to Rio Grande do Sul.
