= Choeradoplana agua =

Scientific classification
- Kingdom: Animalia
- Phylum: Platyhelminthes
- Order: Tricladida
- Family: Geoplanidae
- Genus: Choeradoplana
- Species: C. agua

Binomial name
- Choeradoplana agua Carbayo, Silva, Riutort & Álvarez-Presas, 2017

Species of flatworm

Choeradoplana agua is a species of land planarian belonging to the subfamily Geoplaninae. It is known from specimens found in Desengano State Park in Brazil.

== Description ==
Choeradoplana agua is a small flatworm that has been found to reach up to 60 mm in length and 4 mm in width. It has a slender body with a pointed posterior end. The base color of the dorsal side is a beige color that is covered in clay-brown spots that are more dense near the copulatory apparatus. The ventral side is a sand-yellow color.

It is distinguished from other members of Choeradoplana by its mottled brown dorsal spots, the proximal portion of the prostatic vesicle being outside of the penis bulb, tubular, and initially bifurcated, the intrabulbar portion being pear-shaped with a folded wall, and having no permanent penis papilla.

== Etymology ==
The specific epithet of agua is derived from the Tupi language word aguá, meaning "bubble". This is in reference to the shape of the species' prostatic vesicle.
