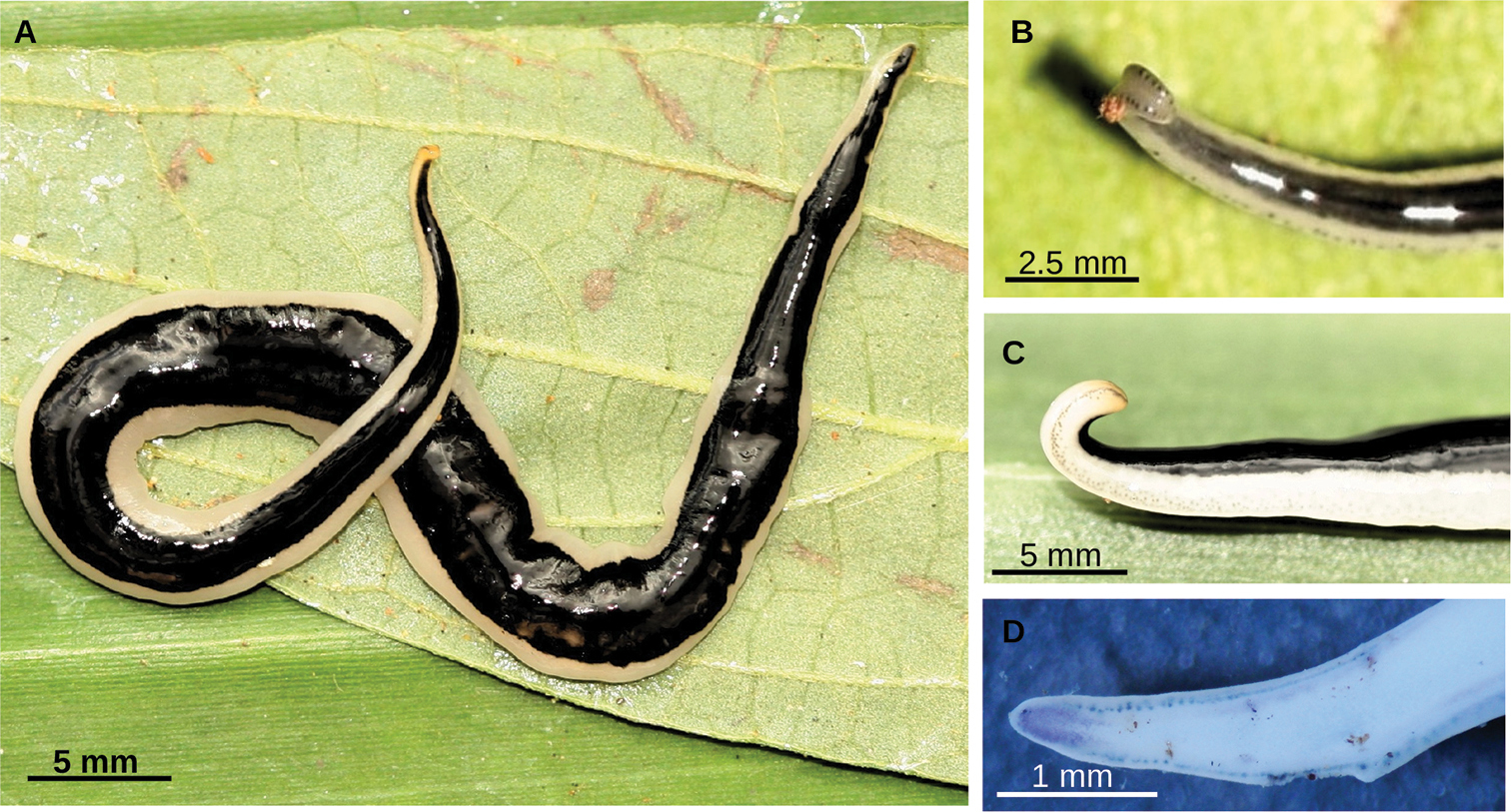

Scientific classification
- Kingdom: Animalia
- Phylum: Platyhelminthes
- Order: Tricladida
- Family: Geoplanidae
- Genus: Choeradoplana
- Species: C. albonigra

Binomial name
- Choeradoplana albonigra (Riester, 1938) Carbayo et al., 2013

Synonyms
- Geoplana albonigra Riester, 1938; Notogynaphallia albonigra (Riester, 1938) Ogren & Kawakatsu, 1990

= Choeradoplana albonigra =

Species of flatworm

Choeradoplana albonigra is a species of land planarian belonging to the subfamily Geoplaninae. It is found in areas within the Atlantic Forest in Brazil, such as the Augusto Ruschi Biological Reserve, Desengano State Park, and the municipality of Teresópolis.

== Description ==
Choeradoplana albonigra is a flatworm around 50–60 cm in length and 2–3 mm in width. It has a slender body with a very thin anterior tip and a pointed posterior tip. The base and ventral color of the body is traffic-white; the dorsal side is covered by a broad graphite-black band that darkens along its margins. In some, but not all, individuals, a thin jet-black stripe runs down the middle of the band. The extremities of the body, anterior and posterior, fade from traffic-white to a slightly orangish color.

It is distinguished from other members of Choeradoplana by its notable black band and white body, the extreme thinning of the anterior tip, no visible dilations separating the head from the body, a concave ventral side of the cephalic region lacking glandular cushions, the proximal third of the prostatic vesicle being outside of the penis bulb, a relatively long copulatory apparatus, lack of a penis papilla, and a funnel-shaped female atrium.

== Etymology ==
The specific epithet of albonigra is derived from the Latin roots of albus and nigra, meaning "white" and "black" respectively, likely in reference to the species' characteristic colors.
