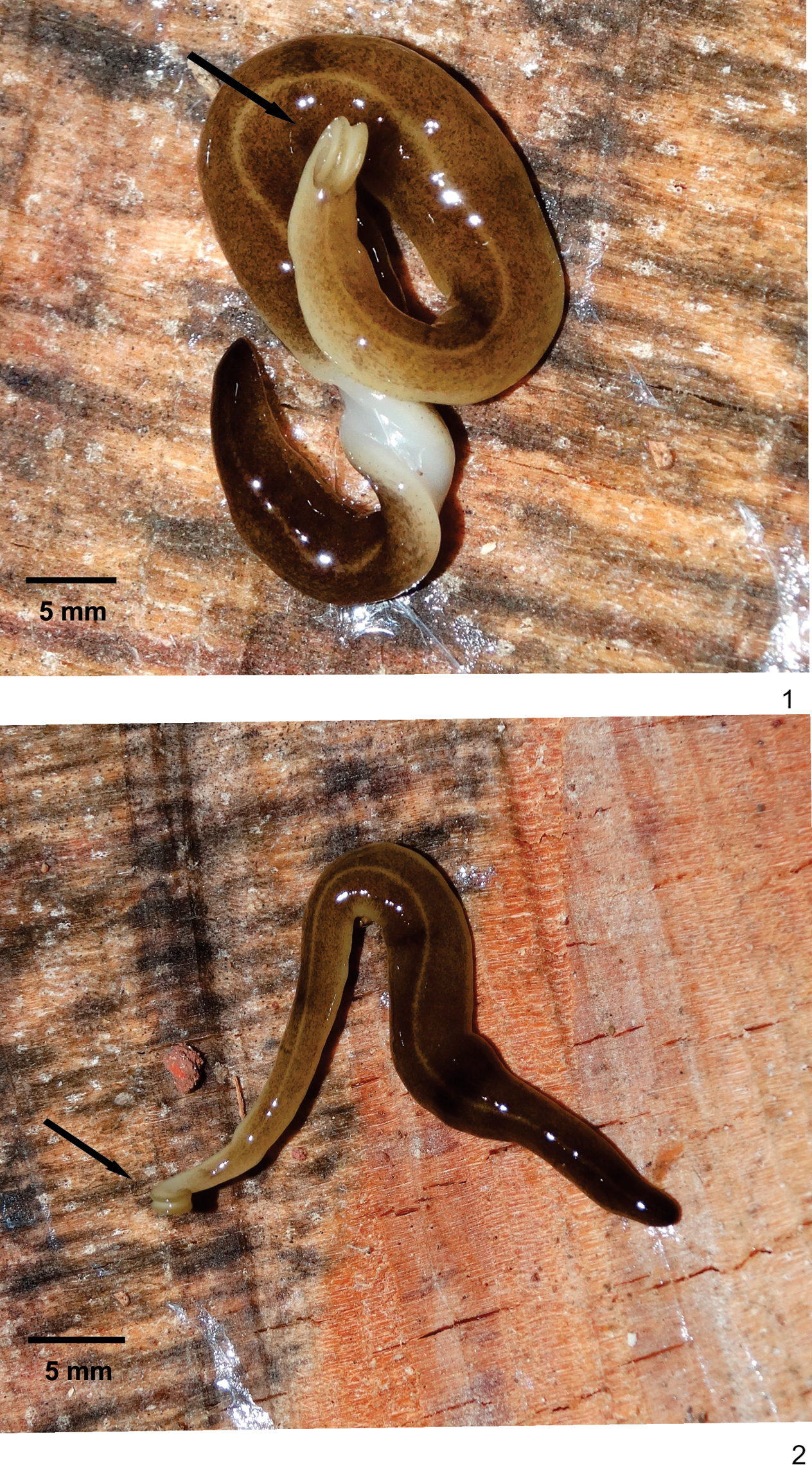

Scientific classification
- Kingdom: Animalia
- Phylum: Platyhelminthes
- Order: Tricladida
- Family: Geoplanidae
- Genus: Choeradoplana
- Species: C. longivesicula

Binomial name
- Choeradoplana longivesicula Iturralde & Leal-Zanchet, 2019

= Choeradoplana longivesicula =

Species of flatworm

Choeradoplana longivesicula is a species of land planarian belonging to the subfamily Geoplaninae. It is known from specimens found in General Carneiro, Brazil.

== Description ==
Choeradoplana longivesicula is a flatworm around 34–67 mm in length and 4–6 mm in width. It has an elongate body with parallel margins. The head, or cephalic region, has two glandular cushions on the ventral side, separated by a longitudinal slit. The front end of the body is expanded, while the back end is slightly pointed. The dorsal side of the body is a yellowish base color, covered densely by irregular, small, dark brown flecks. The yellowish base is visible on the head and margins, as well as on a longitudinal median stripe that runs down the dorsal side aside from the head. The ventral side is a whitish color.

It is distinguished from other members of Choeradoplana by its dark brown flecks and light midstripe, a bell-shaped pharynx, sperm ducts that open laterally into the proximal wall of the prostatic vesicle, a tubular and unpaired prostatic vesicle that narrows to open through the tip of the penis papilla as an ejaculatory duct, a cylindrical, almost symmetrical penis papilla that fills the entire common atrium, and an oval-elongate, unfolded atrium with no difference between the male and female regions.

== Etymology ==
The specific epithet is derived from the Latin words longus and vesicula, literally meaning "long vesicle", in reference to the species' elongated prostatic vesicle.
