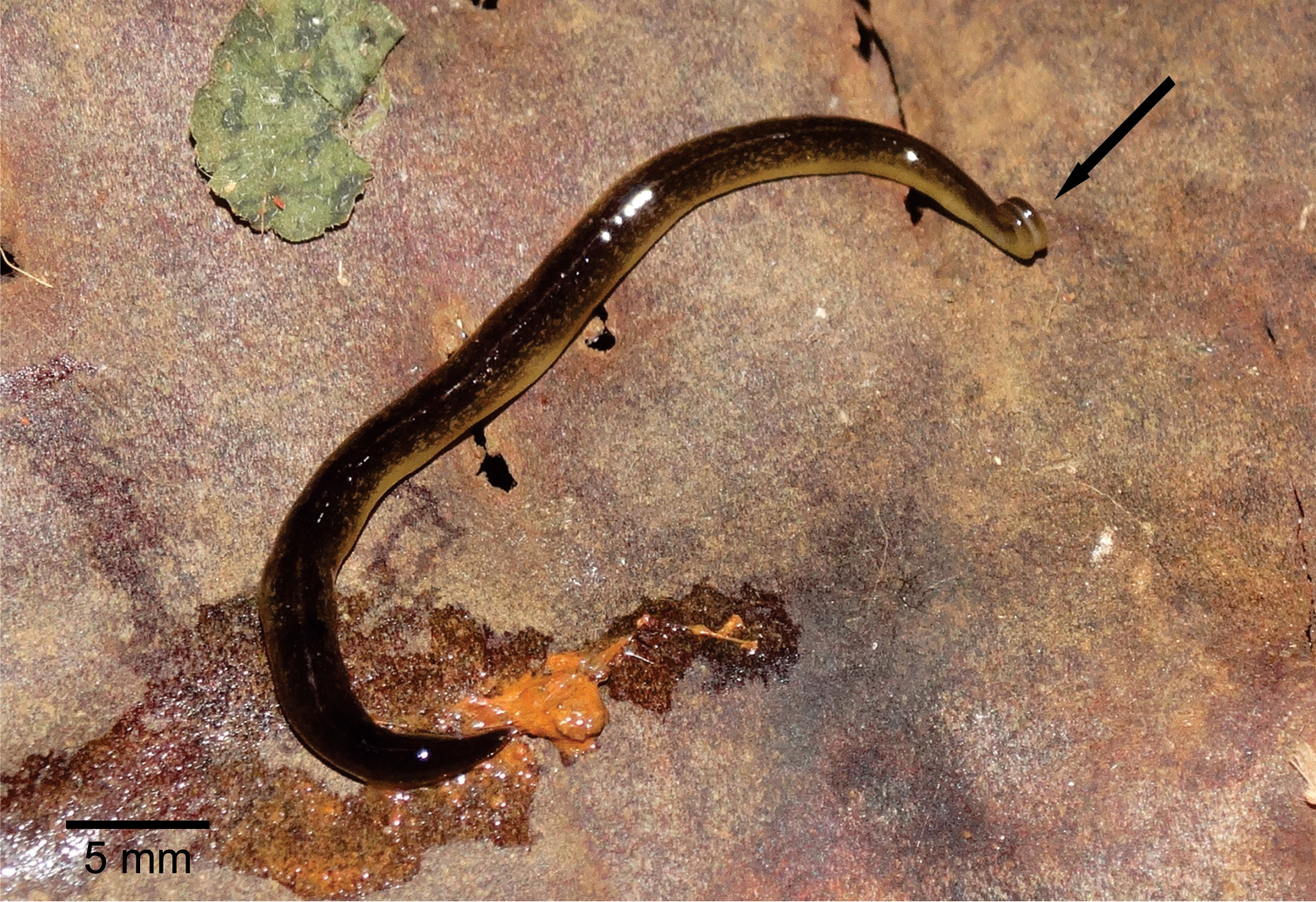

Scientific classification
- Kingdom: Animalia
- Phylum: Platyhelminthes
- Order: Tricladida
- Family: Geoplanidae
- Genus: Choeradoplana
- Species: C. cyanoatria

Binomial name
- Choeradoplana cyanoatria Iturralde & Leal-Zanchet, 2019

= Choeradoplana cyanoatria =

Species of flatworm

Choeradoplana cyanoatria is a species of land planarian belonging to the subfamily Geoplaninae. It is known from specimens found in General Carneiro, Brazil.

== Description ==
Choeradoplana cyanoatria is a flatworm around 20–28 mm in length and 3–4 mm in width. It has an elongate body with parallel margins. The head, or cephalic region, has two glandular cushions on the ventral side, separated by a median slit. The front end of the body is expanded, while the back end is slightly pointed. The dorsal side of the body is a yellowish base color, covered densely by small and irregular dark brown flecks. The yellowish base is visible on the head and margins, as well as on a longitudinal median stripe that runs down the front half of the body aside from the head. The ventral side is a pale yellow color.

It is distinguished from other members of Choeradoplana by its dark brown flecks, a bell-shaped pharynx, sperm ducts that open subterminally into the prostatic vesicle, an oval-elongate, folded prostatic vesicle that becomes funnel-shaped proximally and forms an elongate duct inside the penis papilla, and a conical, long, almost symmetrical penis papilla with a posteriorly-shifted dorsal insertion that fills the entire atrium.

== Etymology ==
The specific epithet is derived from the Latin words cyano ("blue") and atria ("atrium"), in reference to an abundant secretion of cyanophils from an opening in the species' atrium.
