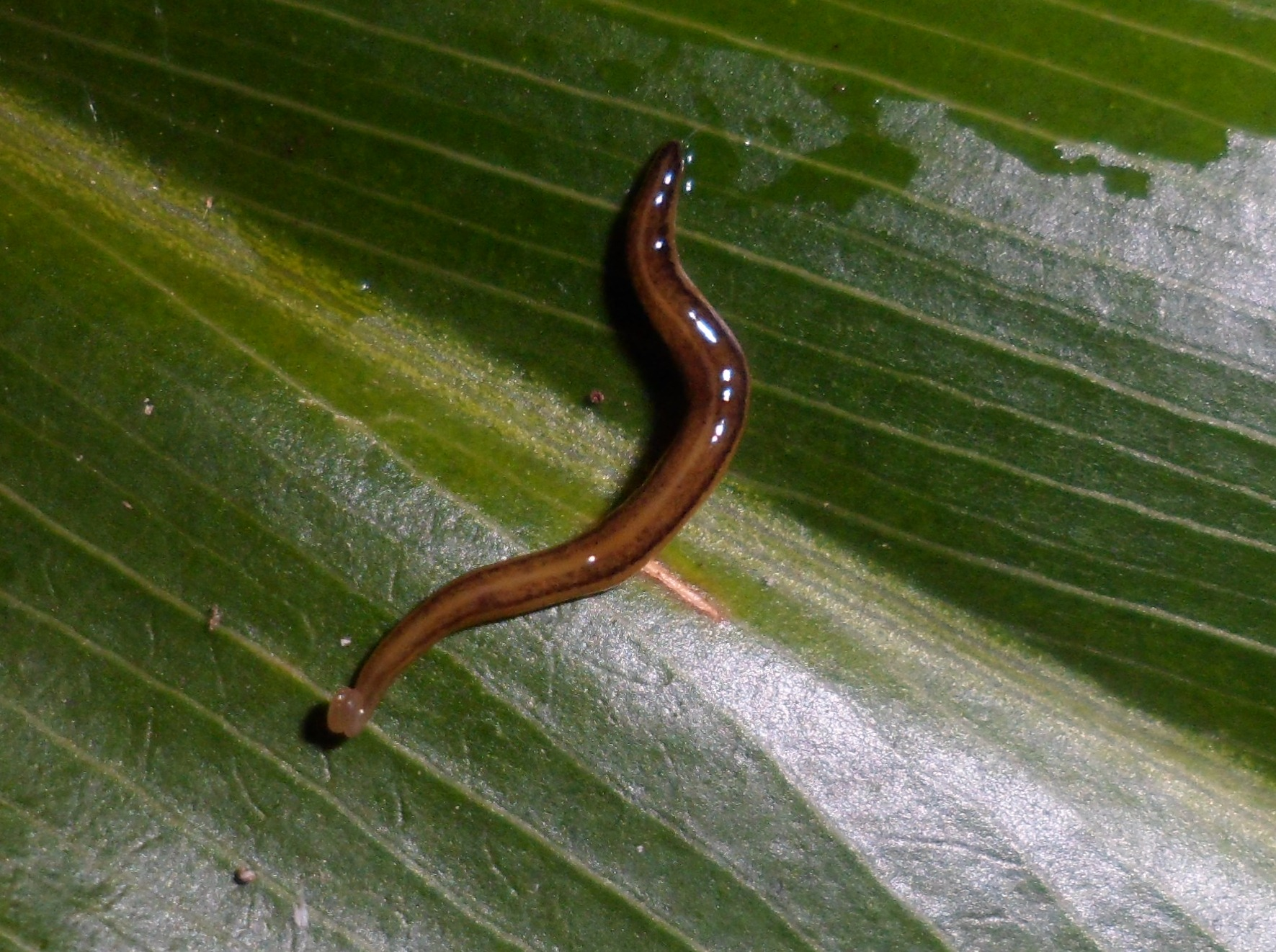

Scientific classification
- Kingdom: Animalia
- Phylum: Platyhelminthes
- Order: Tricladida
- Family: Geoplanidae
- Genus: Choeradoplana
- Species: C. minima

Binomial name
- Choeradoplana minima Lemos & Leal-Zanchet, 2014

= Choeradoplana minima =

Species of flatworm

Choeradoplana minima is a species of land planarian belonging to the subfamily Geoplaninae. It is found in areas of Atlantic Forest within Rio Grande do Sul, Brazil, such as São Francisco de Paula.

== Description ==
Choeradoplana minima is a flatworm that can reach up to 34 mm in length. It has an elongate body with parallel margins. The anterior tip is obtuse and has a pair of brownish glandular cushions on the ventral side; the posterior tip is pointed. The dorsal side of the body has a pale yellow base color, which is visible on the margins of the body; the rest of the dorsal side has two wide, dark brown paramedian stripes, with the pale yellow base visible in-between in the median region. The ventral side is a yellowish color that lightens to a whitish shade in the head region.

It is distinguished from other members of Choeradoplana by its two dark brown stripes, the frontmost testes being posterior to the ovaries and the posteriormost testes being near the root of the pharynx, a short ejaculatory cavity with a folded wall and a sinuous lumen, an inverted penis with a strong bulbar musculature, a well developed muscularis and two main regions, a short male atrium occupied by the tip of the inverted penis, ovovitelline ducts that emerge laterally from the mid-third of the ovaries and ascend behind the gonopore, and male and female atria that have independent musculatures and wide communication at the sagittal plane.

== Etymology ==
The specific epithet, presumably taken from the Latin minima ("small, little"), was given in reference to the short length of mature members of the species.
