= Choeradoplana bocaina =

Scientific classification
- Kingdom: Animalia
- Phylum: Platyhelminthes
- Order: Tricladida
- Family: Geoplanidae
- Genus: Choeradoplana
- Species: C. bocaina

Binomial name
- Choeradoplana bocaina Carbayo & Froehlich, 2012

Species of flatworm

Choeradoplana bocaina is a species of land planarian belonging to the subfamily Geoplaninae. It is found in areas within the Atlantic Forest in Brazil, such as Serra da Bocaina National Park.

== Description ==
Choeradoplana bocaina is a flatworm that has been observed to reach up to 48 mm in length and 4 mm in width. It has a slender body; the cephalic region of the worm is rolled up when it is creeping or resting. The posterior tip of the body is pointed. The creeping sole can reach up to 74% of the body width. The base dorsal color of the body is a yellowish-brown color, with several dark brownish spots of varying size; the spots are more concentrated paramedianly, forming irregular longitudinal stripes. There is a median stripe of darker brown pigment. In certain specimens, the species was observed to have a dorsal web of brown pigment.

It is distinguished from other members of Choeradoplana by its dark pigmented dorsal spots, a bell-shaped pharynx, the extra-bulbar portion of the prostatic vesicle being proximally two-forked and distally dish-shaped, and a narrow posterior section of the female atrium.

== Etymology ==
The specific epithet of bocaina is derived from the type locality of Serra da Bocaina National Park, specifically mentioned to be deriving from the Tupi-Guarani name of the location.
