= Choeradoplana abaiba =

Scientific classification
- Kingdom: Animalia
- Phylum: Platyhelminthes
- Order: Tricladida
- Family: Geoplanidae
- Genus: Choeradoplana
- Species: C. abaiba

Binomial name
- Choeradoplana abaiba Carbayo, Silva, Riutort & Álvarez-Presas, 2017

Species of flatworm

Choeradoplana abaiba is a species of land planarian belonging to the subfamily Geoplaninae. It is known from specimens found in Serra do Tabuleiro State Park in Brazil.

== Description ==
Choeradoplana abaiba is a small flatworm that generally, when unmoving, does not reach past 4 cm in length and 4.5 mm in width. It has a slender, flattened body. The base color of its body is an ochre yellow. There are two separate populations of C. abaiba that observe slight differences in their markings. The Eastern population, within Paulo Lopes, has densely distributed brown pigment aside from irregular, round, clear areas and a slight midline. The Western population, within São Bonifácio, is covered with brown speckles on the dorsal side that form a reticulated ornament; the speckles are denser in the center of the body and looser on the margins. The ventral side is a sand-yellow color.

It is distinguished from other members of Choeradoplana by its mottled brown speckles, sperm ducts that penetrate the lower-front or side-front wall of the penis bulb, a prostatic vesicle within the penis bulb with a dorsally-oriented proximal half, and no permanent penis papilla.

== Etymology ==
The specific epithet of abaiba is derived from the Tupi language word abaíba, meaning "difficult, arduous". This is in reference to the reported difficulty of delimiting the species' taxonomy both morphologically and molecularly.
