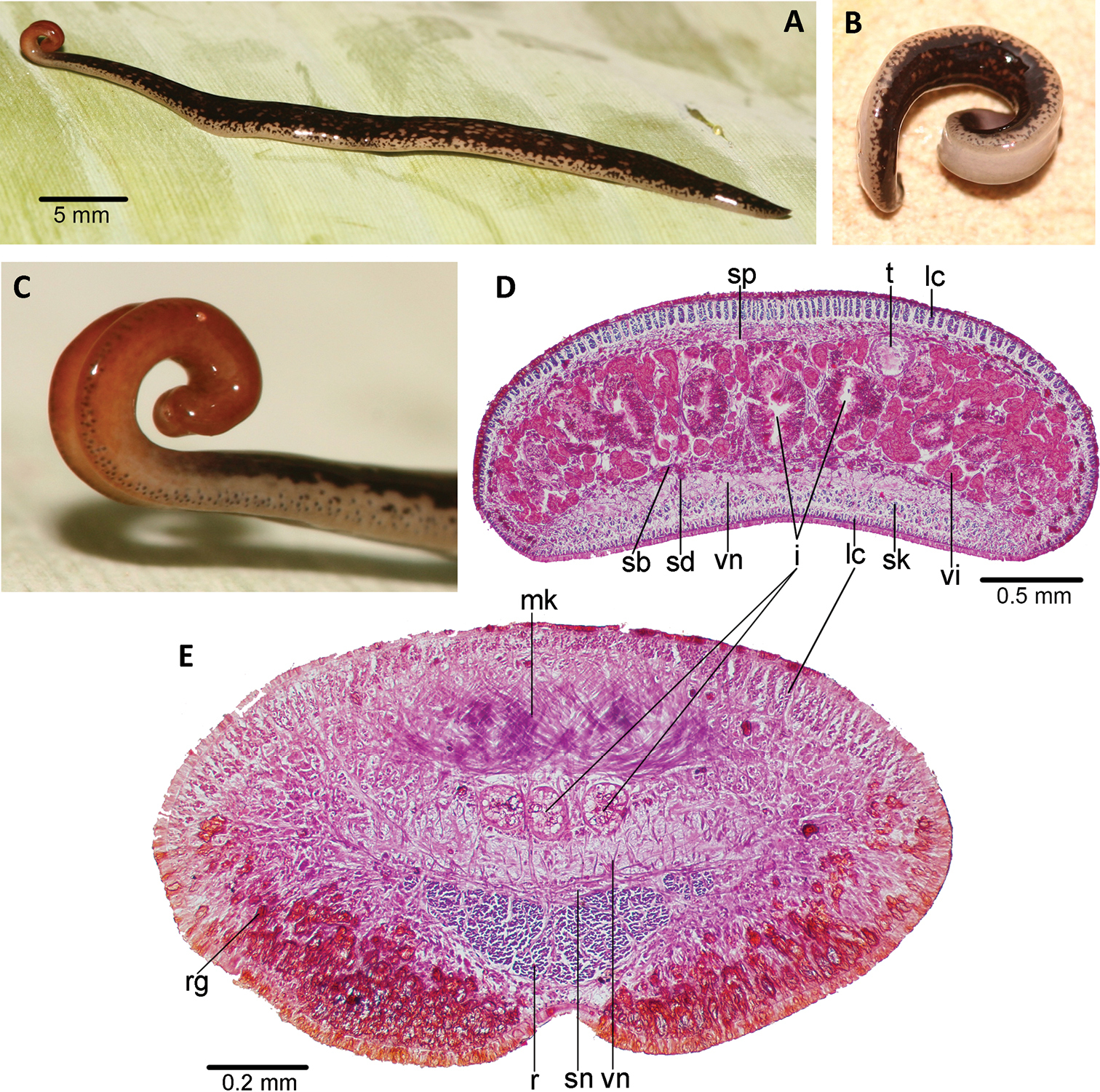

Scientific classification
- Kingdom: Animalia
- Phylum: Platyhelminthes
- Order: Tricladida
- Family: Geoplanidae
- Genus: Choeradoplana
- Species: C. onae

Binomial name
- Choeradoplana onae Largo-Barcia, Silva & Carbayo, 2021

= Choeradoplana onae =

Species of flatworm

Choeradoplana onae is a species of land planarian belonging to the subfamily Geoplaninae. It is known from specimens found in the Augusto Ruschi Biological Reserve in Brazil.

== Description ==
Choeradoplana onae is a flatworm around 41–45 mm in length and 3–4 mm in width. It has a slender, subcylindrical body. The head, or cephalic region, is distinguished by a rolled up and dilated "neck" with the ventral surface facing outwards, with glandular cushions. The back tip of the body is pointed. The creeping sole is 87% of the body width. The dorsal side of the body is an ivory base color, covered almost entirely with a wide, sepia brown band, aside from irregular spots that expose its ivory color. The border of the band merging with the ivory base on the side is irregular and spotted. The rolled up front tip fades into a red-orange color, both dorsally and ventrally. The rest of the ventral side is a light grey color.

It is distinguished from other members of Choeradoplana by its ivory color and brown band, having a dish-shaped portion of the extrabulbar region of the prostatic vesicle, a copulatory apparatus that's 3.8 times longer than its height, and a male atrium with four to six main folds.

== Etymology ==
The specific epithet, onae, was derived from an affectionate nickname given to Marta Álvarez-Presas of the University of Bristol; the species name was given to honor her "contributions to understanding the systematics of free-living flatworms".
