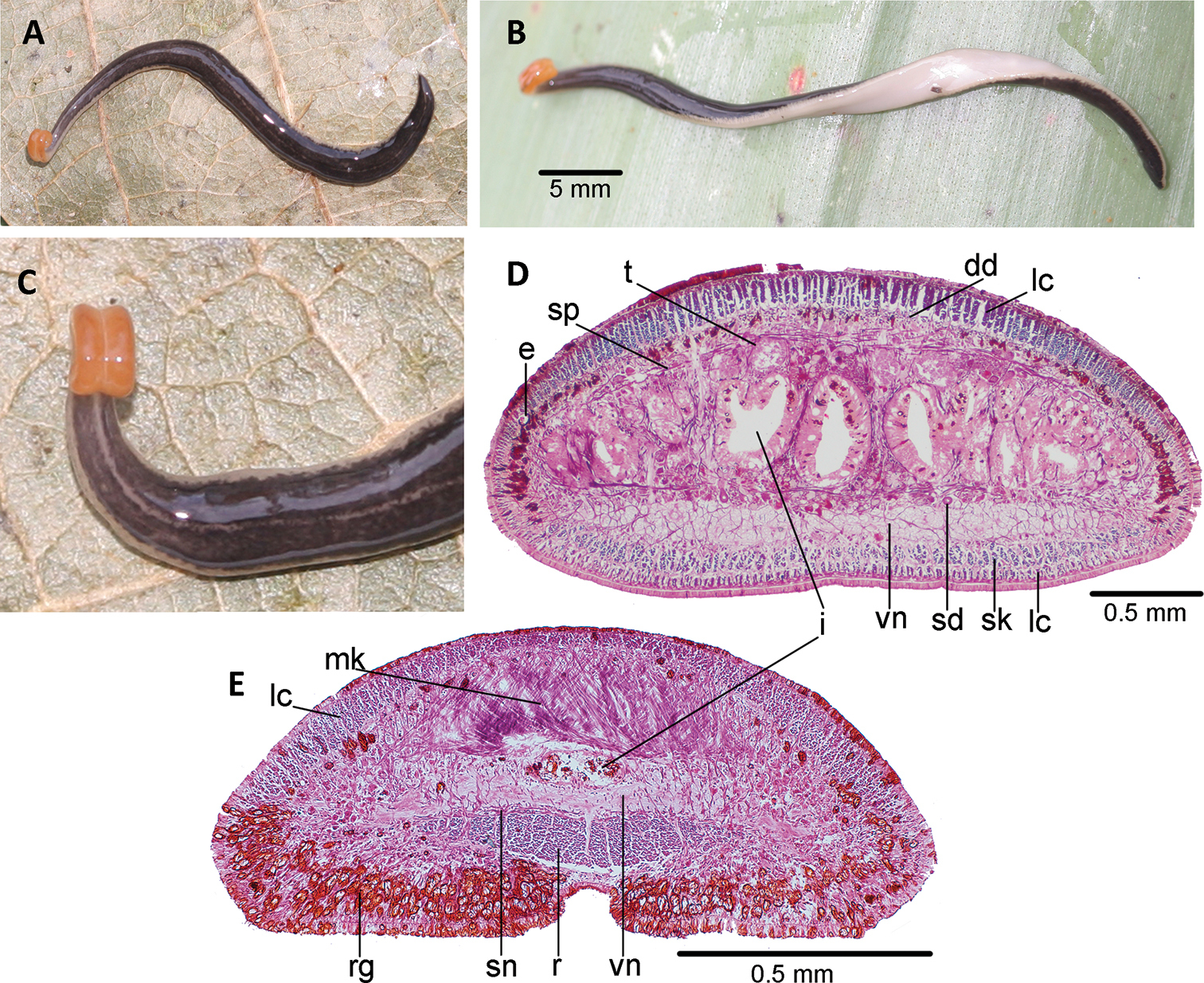

Scientific classification
- Kingdom: Animalia
- Phylum: Platyhelminthes
- Order: Tricladida
- Family: Geoplanidae
- Genus: Choeradoplana
- Species: C. riutortae

Binomial name
- Choeradoplana riutortae Largo-Barcia, Silva & Carbayo, 2021

= Choeradoplana riutortae =

Species of flatworm

Choeradoplana riutortae is a species of land planarian belonging to the subfamily Geoplaninae. It is known from specimens found in Serra dos Órgãos National Park in Brazil.

== Description ==
Choeradoplana riutortae is a flatworm around 37–42 mm in length and 2.5–3 mm in width. It has a slender, subcylindrical body. The head, or cephalic region, is distinguished by a rolled up and dilated "neck" with the ventral surface facing outwards, with glandular cushions. The back tip of the body is pointed. The creeping sole is 72–75% of the body width. The dorsal side of the body is a light ivory base color, with several sepia brown spots that are generally merged with each other. A light ivory midline can either extend the length of the body or be exclusively in the front region. The spots, at the body's sides, create an irregular border with the ivory base color. The rolled up front tip fades into a red-orange color; this region is a slightly paler red-orange on the ventral side. The rest of the ventral side is a light grey color.

It is distinguished from other members of Choeradoplana by its ivory color and brown spots, its red-orange front tip, part of the longitudinal cutaneous musculature being sunken in the ventral parenchyma, the prostatic vesicle having a paired extrabulbar dish-shaped portion, the vesicle also having an elongated intrabulbar portion with an irregular epithelium, a short copulatory apparatus, and an equal size between the male and female atria.

== Etymology ==
The specific epithet, riutortae, was given in honor of Professor Marta Riutort, for her "contributions to understanding the evolution of flatworms".
