= Choeradoplana pucupucu =

Scientific classification
- Kingdom: Animalia
- Phylum: Platyhelminthes
- Order: Tricladida
- Family: Geoplanidae
- Genus: Choeradoplana
- Species: C. pucupucu

Binomial name
- Choeradoplana pucupucu Carbayo, Silva, Riutort & Álvarez-Presas, 2017

Species of flatworm

Choeradoplana pucupucu is a species of land planarian belonging to the subfamily Geoplaninae. It is found in areas within the Atlantic Forest in Brazil, such as Serra da Bocaina National Park and in municipalities such as Teresópolis, São José do Barreiro, Salesópolis, and Ribeirão Pires.

== Description ==
Choeradoplana pucupucu is a small flatworm that has been found to reach up to 50 mm in length and 3.5 mm in width. It has a slender body. The colors of the dorsal side can range from a cream to an orange-brown color, which appear as a light or dark brown; it is covered in olive-brown speckles. The ventral side is an oyster-white color.

It is distinguished from other members of Choeradoplana by the dorsal color being mottled with brown speckles, the sperm ducts penetrating the frontal-side wall of the penis bulb, a prostatic vesicle within the penis bulb with a canalicular, sinuous and back-oriented proximal half, a relatively long copulatory apparatus, and no permanent penis papilla. Additionally, the male atrium is elongate and lined with a ciliated epithelium underlain by a spongy tissue.

== Etymology ==
The specific epithet of pucupucu is derived from the Tupi language word of the same name, meaning "very long". This is in reference to the relatively long length of the species' prostatic vesicle.
