= Choeradoplana gladismariae =

Scientific classification
- Kingdom: Animalia
- Phylum: Platyhelminthes
- Order: Tricladida
- Family: Geoplanidae
- Genus: Choeradoplana
- Species: C. gladismariae

Binomial name
- Choeradoplana gladismariae Carbayo & Froehlich, 2012

Species of flatworm

Choeradoplana gladismariae is a species of land planarian belonging to the subfamily Geoplaninae. It is found in areas within the Atlantic Forest in Brazil, such as the Intervales State Park.

== Description ==
Choeradoplana gladismariae is a flatworm around 32 mm in length and 2 mm in width. It has a wide body with rounded margins and a convex ventral side. The anterior ventral end has a pair of glandular cushions; the posterior tip is pointed. The base dorsal color of the body is yellowish; it has a thin longitudinal stripe of a dark brown color, and two para-median lines of brown specks that are almost marbled in pattern. The median line ends before the apex of the anterior tip; the exposed ventral side on the anterior tip is a greyish color. At the posterior tip, the midline and the marbled bands merge. The ventral side is a whitish color that turns faintly yellow as it approaches the margins.

It is distinguished from other members of Choeradoplana by its thin, dark brown midline, two bands of brown spots, pale yellowish color, its cutaneous layer of longitudinal muscle being partially sunken into the parenchyma, and the walls of the prostatic vesicle being bellows-like and pleated.

== Etymology ==
The specific epithet of gladismariae was given in honor of Gladis Maria Schmidt, to whom the species was dedicated; Schmidt is the wife of Fernando Carbayo, one of the authors of the species' description. Carbayo has done many additional descriptions and research on flatworms within Brazil.
