= Santa Maria Madalena, Rio de Janeiro =

Santa Maria Madalena
- Municipality
- Município de Santa Maria Madalena
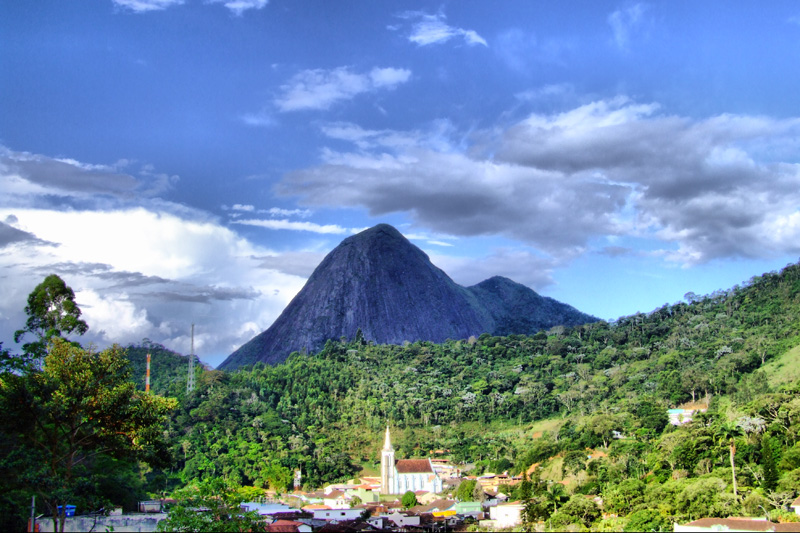

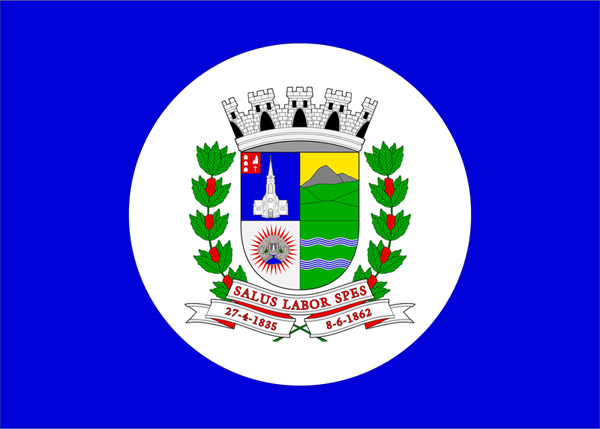
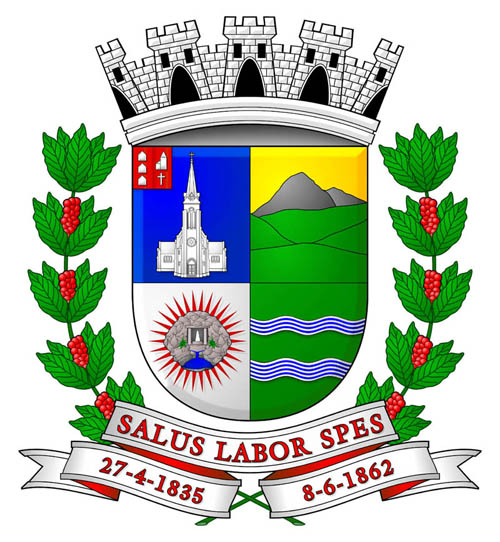
- Flag Coat of arms

- Location of Santa Maria Madalena in the state of Rio de Janeiro

- Location of Santa Maria Madalena in Brazil
- Coordinates: 21°57′18″S 42°00′28″W
- Country: Brazil
- Region: Southeast
- State: Rio de Janeiro

Government
  - Prefeito: Carlos Botelho (DEM)

Area
  - Total: 815.591 km^{2} (314.901 sq mi)
- Elevation: 615 m (2,018 ft)

Population (2020)
  - Total: 10,392
- Time zone: UTC−3 (BRT)

Santa Maria Madalena (Portuguese pronunciation: [ˈsɐ̃tɐ mɐˈɾi.ɐ madɐˈlẽnɐ]) is a municipality located in the Brazilian state of Rio de Janeiro. Its population was 10,392 (2020) and its area is 816 km^{2}.

The municipality contains part of the 21,444-hectare (52,990-acre) Desengano State Park, created in 1970.

== Climate ==
Climate data for Santa Maria Madalena, Rio de Janeiro (1981–2010)
Month	Jan	Feb	Mar	Apr	May	Jun	Jul	Aug	Sep	Oct	Nov	Dec	Year
Mean daily maximum °C (°F)	28.4 (83.1)	29.4 (84.9)	28.3 (82.9)	26.7 (80.1)	24.5 (76.1)	23.3 (73.9)	23.1 (73.6)	23.9 (75.0)	24.2 (75.6)	25.7 (78.3)	26.4 (79.5)	27.3 (81.1)	25.9 (78.6)
Mean daily minimum °C (°F)	18.8 (65.8)	18.8 (65.8)	18.4 (65.1)	17.0 (62.6)	14.9 (58.8)	13.3 (55.9)	13.0 (55.4)	13.1 (55.6)	14.5 (58.1)	16.0 (60.8)	17.1 (62.8)	18.1 (64.6)	16.1 (61.0)
Average precipitation mm (inches)	245.6 (9.67)	134.7 (5.30)	165.9 (6.53)	87.6 (3.45)	60.0 (2.36)	43.4 (1.71)	45.9 (1.81)	42.6 (1.68)	93.1 (3.67)	113.6 (4.47)	195.0 (7.68)	262.9 (10.35)	1,490.3 (58.67)
Average precipitation days (≥ 1.0 mm)	12	8	10	7	5	4	5	4	8	8	11	13	95
Source: Instituto Nacional de Meteorologia
