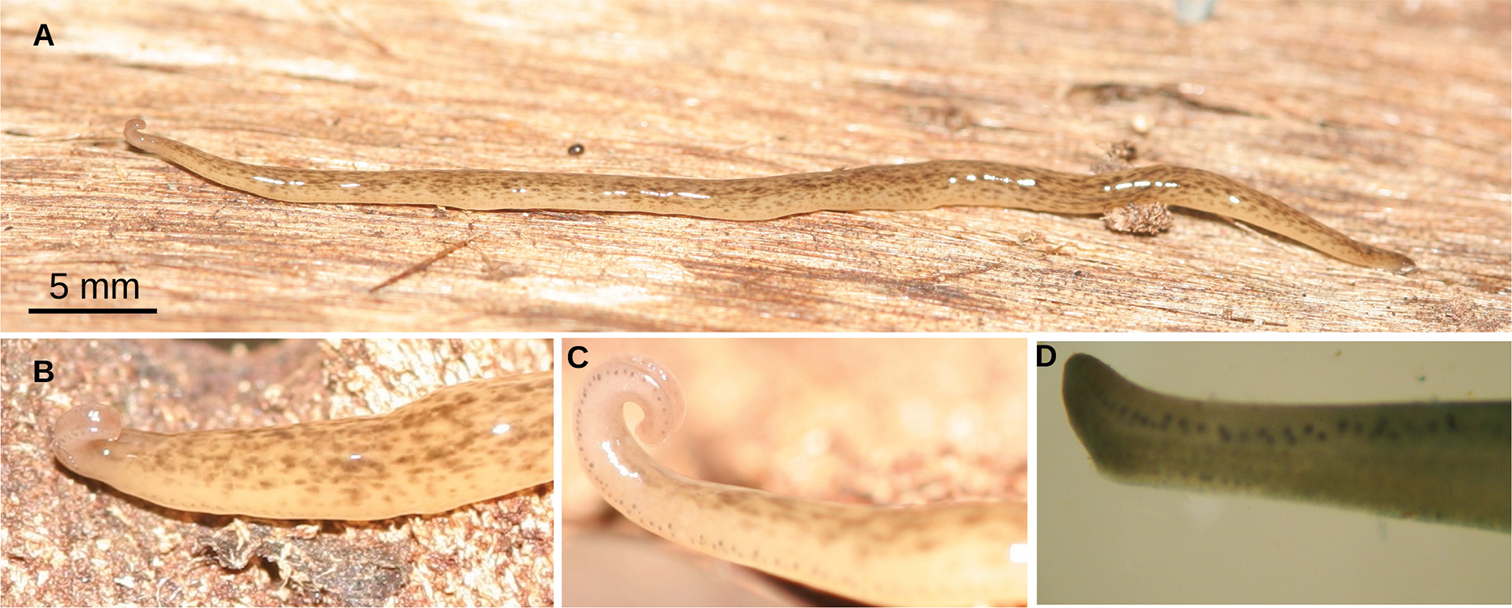

Scientific classification
- Kingdom: Animalia
- Phylum: Platyhelminthes
- Order: Tricladida
- Family: Geoplanidae
- Genus: Choeradoplana
- Species: C. eudoxiae

Binomial name
- Choeradoplana eudoxiae Largo-Barcia, Silva & Carbayo, 2021

= Choeradoplana eudoxiae =

Species of flatworm

Choeradoplana eudoxiae is a species of land planarian belonging to the subfamily Geoplaninae. It is known from specimens found in the São Francisco de Paula National Forest in Brazil.

== Description ==
Choeradoplana eudoxiae is a flatworm around 38 mm in length and 1.5–2 mm in width. It has a slender, subcylindrical body that narrows as it approaches the front tip of the body, with a convex dorsal side and a slightly convex ventral side. The front tip is rounded, and the back tip is pointed. The head region is rolled up. The creeping sole is 75.5% of the body width. The dorsal side of the body is a pastel yellow base color with fawn brown spots; in the paramedian regions of the body, these spots are denser. The ventral side is a cream color. The front tip is a greyish color dorsally and ventrally.

It is distinguished from other members of Choeradoplana by its yellow color and brown spots, a lack of any lateral dilations or "neck" separating the head from the rest of the body, the ventral side of the head being concave, a lack of glandular cushions, the extrabulbar portion of the prostatic vesicle having paired branches and an unpaired, rounded section, the intrabulbar portion of the vesicle being a dilated vertical duct, and a lack of a penis papilla.

== Etymology ==
The specific epithet, eudoxiae, was given in honor of Eudóxia Maria Froehlich, for "her insightful life lessons and lasting contribution to the knowledge of the neotropical planarian fauna for 60 years".
