= Choeradoplana crassiphalla =

Scientific classification
- Kingdom: Animalia
- Phylum: Platyhelminthes
- Order: Tricladida
- Family: Geoplanidae
- Genus: Choeradoplana
- Species: C. crassiphalla

Binomial name
- Choeradoplana crassiphalla Negrete & Brusa, 2012

Species of flatworm

Choeradoplana crassiphalla is a species of land planarian belonging to the subfamily Geoplaninae. It is known from specimens found in the Reserva de Vida Silvestre Urugua-í within the Urugua-í Provincial Park in Argentina.

== Description ==
Choeradoplana crassiphalla is a flatworm around 22–43 mm in length, 1.5–3.5 mm in width, and 0.9–1.9 mm in height. It has a blunt front tip with striations on its ventral side separated by a groove. The back end narrows gradually. The dorsal side of the body is a brown color that can vary in shade and pigmentation amount. There is a thin median longitudinal stripe running down the dorsal side, lighter than the base color. It starts just below the front tip and continues down before disappearing before the back end. The front tip is a light grey color. The body margins are a yellowish-brown color. The ventral side can range from a pale yellowish to a whitish color. Some specimens have been observed with a black posterior tip.

It is distinguished from other members of Choeradoplana by its brown color and midline, its yellowish margin, an intra-bulbar prostatic vesicle consisting of a large, highly-folded chamber, a short, high, thick penis papilla hanging from the roof of the male atrium under the prostatic vesicle, and the female atrium being three to five times shorter than the male atrium.

== Etymology ==
The specific epithet is derived from the Latin words crassus and phallus, literally translating to "thick penis". This is in reference to the thickness of the species' penis papilla.
