= Choeradoplana banga =

Scientific classification
- Kingdom: Animalia
- Phylum: Platyhelminthes
- Order: Tricladida
- Family: Geoplanidae
- Genus: Choeradoplana
- Species: C. banga

Binomial name
- Choeradoplana banga Carbayo & Froehlich, 2012

Species of flatworm

Choeradoplana banga is a species of land planarian belonging to the subfamily Geoplaninae. It is found in areas within the Atlantic Forest in Brazil, such as Cantareira State Park.

== Description ==
Choeradoplana banga is a flatworm around 45 mm in length and 2–3 mm in width. It has an elongated body with a dilated anterior tip and a pointed posterior tip. The base dorsal color of the body is a pale ochre with several irregular dark brown spots. The ventral side of the body is a pale yellowish color.

It is distinguished from other members of Choeradoplana by its pale ochre color and brown spots, a bell-shaped pharynx, an intrabulbar prostatic vesicle, a narrow female atrium, the common glandular ovovitelline duct approaching the vagina from behind the atrium, and a large sphincter under the male and female atria that is adjacent to the gonopore canal.

== Etymology ==
The specific epithet of banga is derived from a word within the Tupi-Guarani language family, banga, meaning "bent, reverse"; this is in reference to the species' glandular ovovitelline duct approaching behind the atrium, in contrast to other members of the genus.
