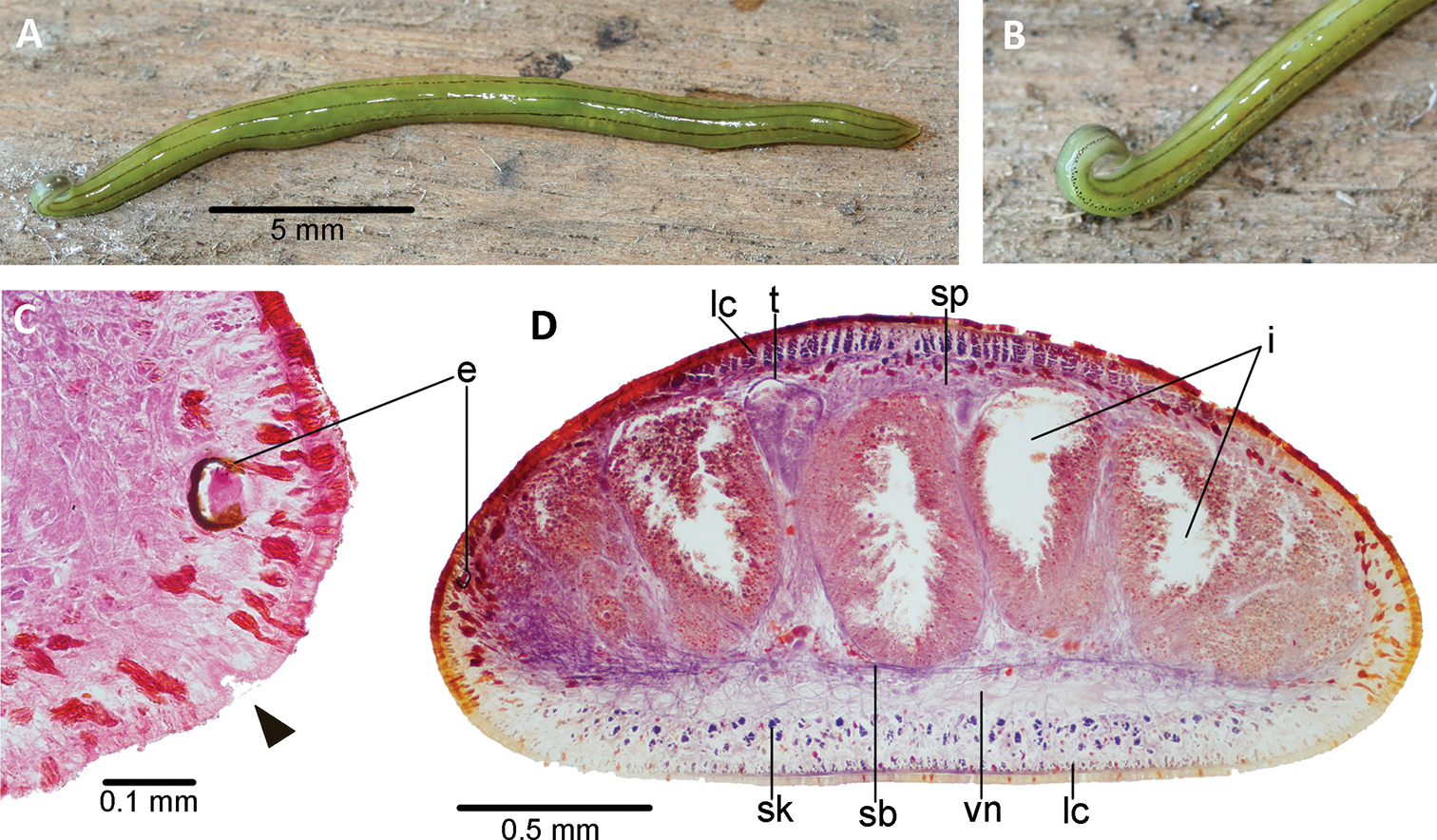

Scientific classification
- Kingdom: Animalia
- Phylum: Platyhelminthes
- Order: Tricladida
- Family: Geoplanidae
- Genus: Choeradoplana
- Species: C. tristriata

Binomial name
- Choeradoplana tristriata (Müller, 1856) Largo-Barcia, Silva & Carbayo, 2021

Synonyms
- Geoplana tristriata Müller, 1856; Pseudogeoplana tristriata (Müller, 1856) Ogren & Kawakatsu, 1990

= Choeradoplana tristriata =

Species of flatworm

Choeradoplana tristriata is a species of land planarian belonging to the subfamily Geoplaninae. It is found in areas of Atlantic Forest within Blumenau and Serra do Tabuleiro State Park in Brazil.

== Description ==
Choeradoplana tristriata is a flatworm around 22 mm in length and 2.5 mm in width. It has a slender, subcylindrical body. The head, or cephalic region, is distinguished by a rolled up and dilated "neck" with the ventral surface facing outwards, with glandular cushions. The posterior tip is pointed. The creeping sole is 90% of the body width. The dorsal side of the body is a yellow-green base color with three thin, irregular longitudinal lines made up of small black spots. In the median line, the spots are less concentrated. The ventral side is a zinc yellow color, aside from a silver-gray spot on the glandular cushions.

It is distinguished from other members of Choeradoplana by its yellow-green color and irregular black lines, its zinc-yellow ventral side, a compact copulatory apparatus lacking a penis papilla, and a funnel-shaped female atrium.

== Etymology ==
The specific epithet is presumably taken from the prefix tri- and the Latin striatus, meaning "striated", likely in reference to the three irregular lines on the species' body.
