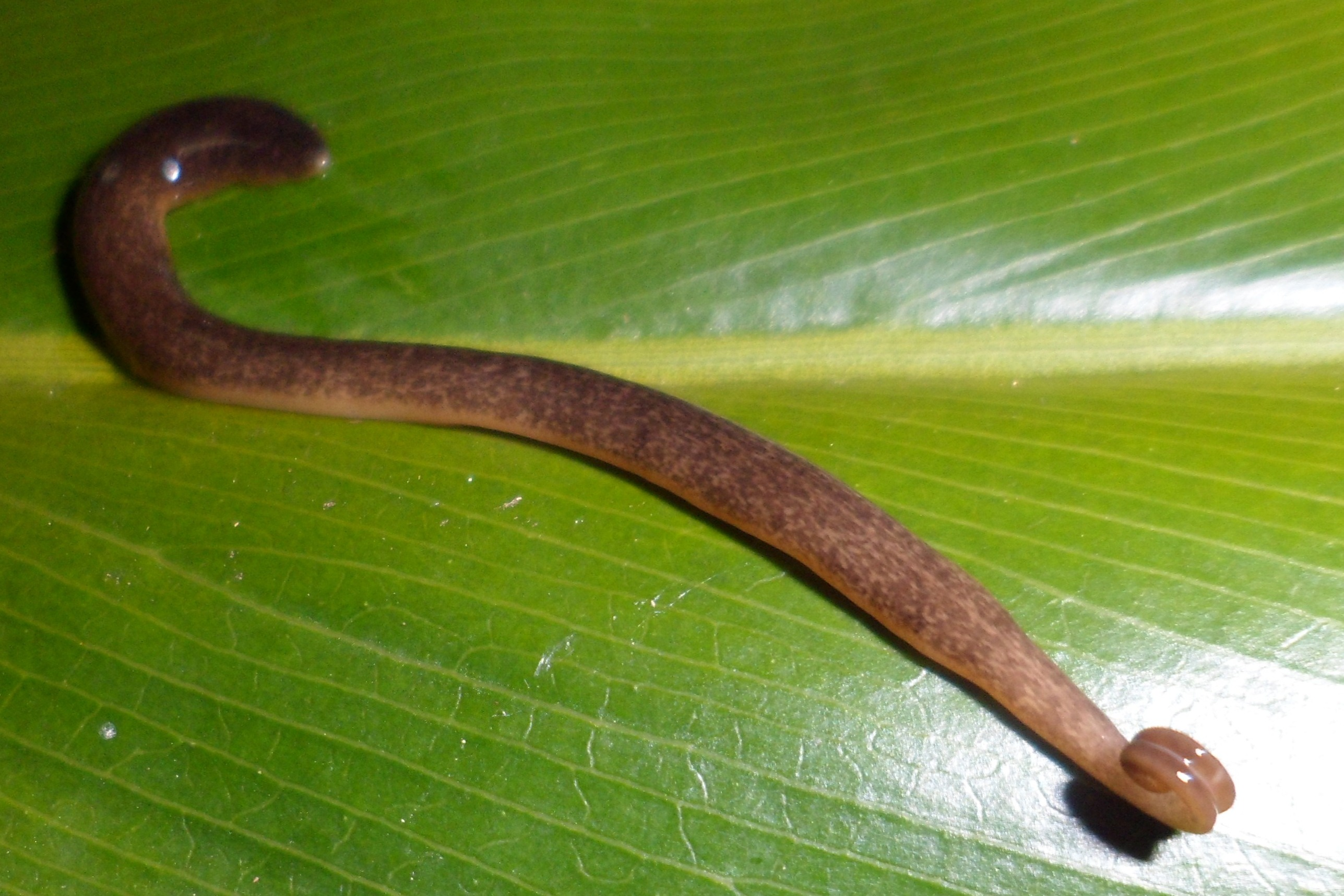
- Choeradoplana iheringi

Scientific classification
- Kingdom: Animalia
- Phylum: Platyhelminthes
- Order: Tricladida
- Family: Geoplanidae
- Subfamily: Geoplaninae
- Genus: Choeradoplana; Graff, 1896

Type species
- Choeradoplana iheringi Graff, 1899

= Choeradoplana =

Genus of flatworms

Choeradoplana is a genus of land planarians found in South America.

== Description ==
Species of the genus Choeradoplana are characterized by the presence of a cephalic retractor muscle associated with cephalic glands, forming a cephalic musculo-glandular organ in a way similar to the one found in the genera Luteostriata and Issoca. The head of Choeradoplana is highly rolled backwards and the ventral area thus visible has two "cushions" formed by the musculo-glandular organ. This peculiar head shape makes it easy to identify a species as belonging to this genus.

== Etymology ==
The name Choeradoplana comes from Greek word χοιράς (scrofula) and the Latin word plana (flat) due to the two cushions on the ventral side of the head that resemble the neck swellings in patients affected by scrofula.

== Species ==
The genus Choeradoplana currently includes the following 24 species:

- Choeradoplana abaiba Carbayo, Silva, Riutort & Álvarez-Presas, 2017
- Choeradoplana agua Carbayo, Silva, Riutort & Álvarez-Presas, 2017
- Choeradoplana albonigra (Riester, 1938)
- Choeradoplana banga Carbayo & Froehlich, 2012
- Choeradoplana benyai Lemos & Leal-Zanchet, 2014
- Choeradoplana bilix Marcus, 1951
- Choeradoplana bocaina Carbayo & Froehlich, 2012
- Choeradoplana catua Froehlich, 1954
- Choeradoplana claudioi Lago-Barcia & Carbayo, 2021
- Choeradoplana crassiphalla Negrete & Brusa, 2012
- Choeradoplana cyanoatria Iturralde & Leal-Zanchet, 2019
- Choeradoplana ehrenreichi Graff, 1899
- Choeradoplana eudoxiae Silva & Carbayo, 2021
- Choeradoplana gladismariae Carbayo & Froehlich, 2012
- Choeradoplana iheringi Graff, 1899
- Choeradoplana langi (Dendy, 1894)
- Choeradoplana longivesicula Iturralde & Leal-Zanchet, 2019
- Choeradoplana malaria Negrete & Brusa, 2024
- Choeradoplana marthae Froehlich, 1954
- Choeradoplana minima Lemos & Leal-Zanchet, 2014
- Choeradoplana onae Lago-Barcia & Carbayo, 2021
- Choeradoplana pucupucu Carbayo, Silva, Riutort & Álvarez-Presas, 2017
- Choeradoplana riutortae Lago-Barcia & Carbayo, 2021
- Choeradoplana tristriata (Schultze & Müller, 1857)
