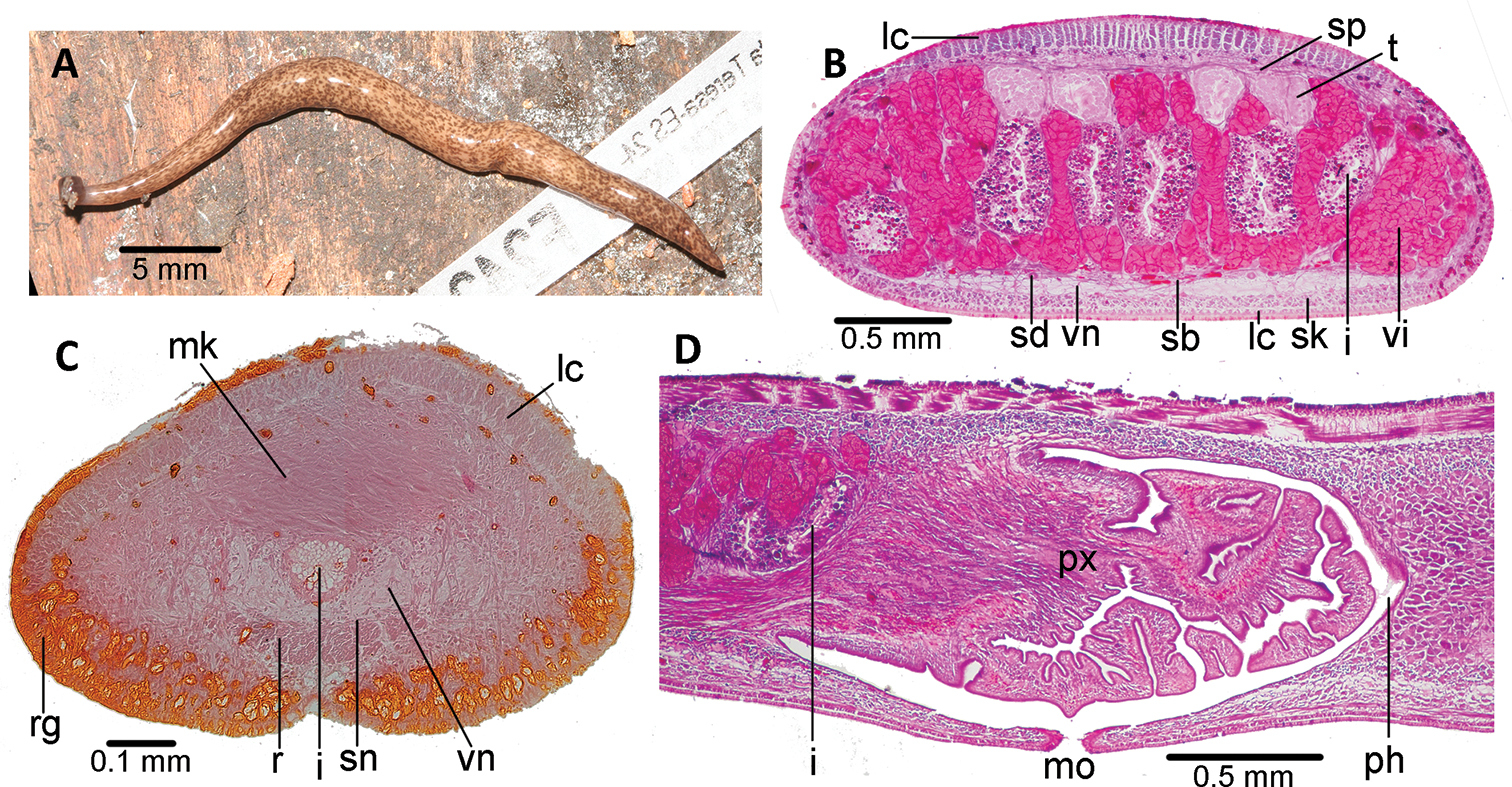

Scientific classification
- Kingdom: Animalia
- Phylum: Platyhelminthes
- Order: Tricladida
- Family: Geoplanidae
- Genus: Choeradoplana
- Species: C. claudioi

Binomial name
- Choeradoplana claudioi Largo-Barcia, Silva & Carbayo, 2021

= Choeradoplana claudioi =

Species of flatworm

Choeradoplana claudioi is a species of land planarian belonging to the subfamily Geoplaninae. It is known from specimens found in the Augusto Ruschi Biological Reserve in Brazil.

== Description ==
Choeradoplana claudioi is a flatworm around 24–37 mm in length and 2.5–3 mm in width. It has a slender, subcylindrical body. The head, or cephalic region, is distinguished by a rolled up and dilated "neck" with the ventral surface facing outwards, with glandular cushions. The back tip of the body is pointed. The creeping sole is 75% of the body width. The dorsal side of the body is a golden yellow color, with scattered sepia speckles across the entire dorsal side, aside from the front tip, which is a greyish color. The ventral side is a golden yellow color as well.

It is distinguished from other members of Choeradoplana by its gold color, brown speckles and grey tip, the extrabulbar portion of the prostatic vesicle being dish-like, and a dorsoventrally compressed female atrium that is positioned partially below the outer section of the male atrium.

== Etymology ==
The specific epithet, claudioi, was given in honor of Claudio Gilberto Froehlich, for his "contributions to the knowledge of the Neotropical land planarians".
