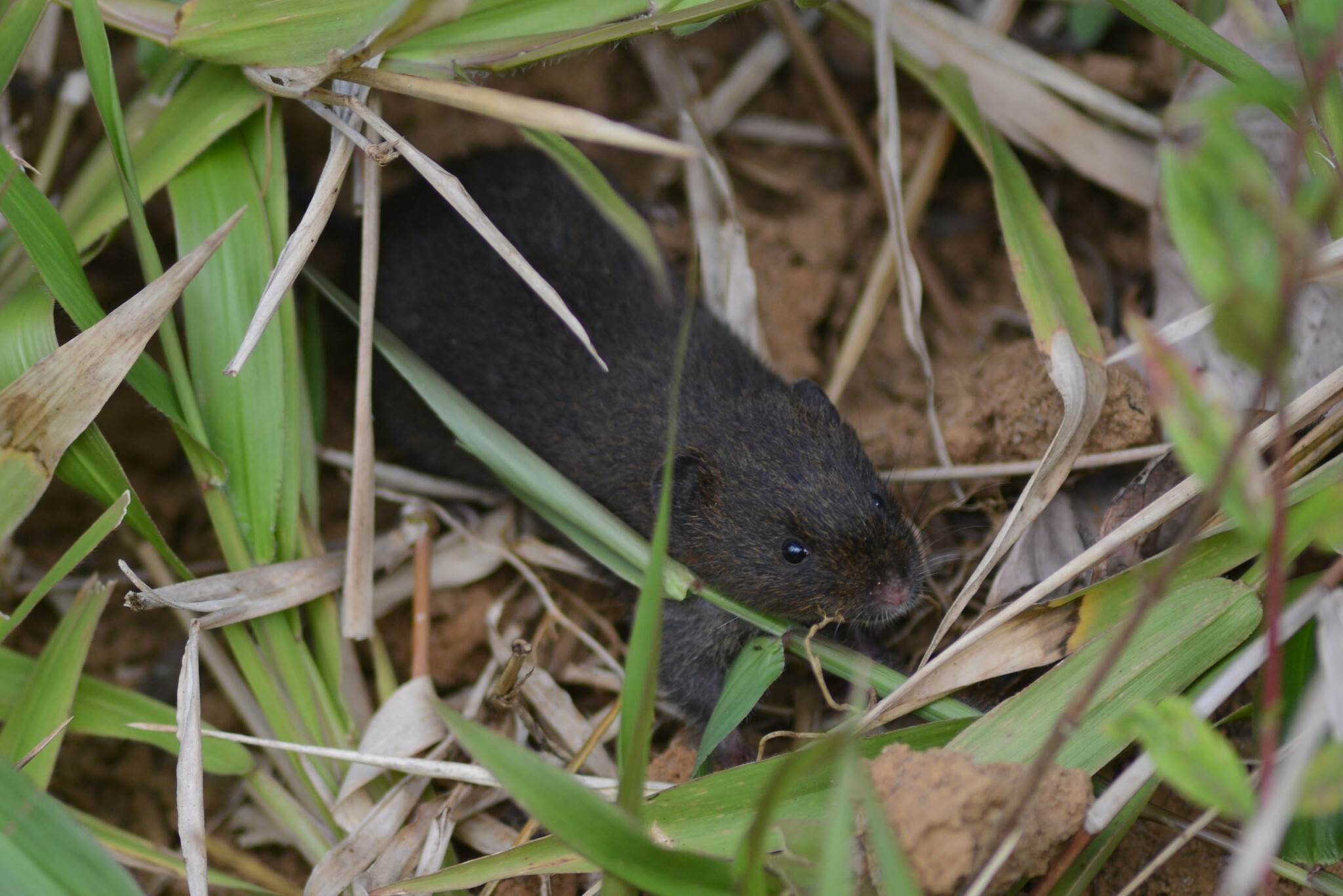

Conservation status
- Least Concern (IUCN 3.1)

Scientific classification
- Kingdom: Animalia
- Phylum: Chordata
- Class: Mammalia
- Order: Rodentia
- Family: Cricetidae
- Subfamily: Sigmodontinae
- Tribe: Akodontini
- Genus: Thaptomys; Thomas, 1916
- Species: T. nigrita

Binomial name
- Thaptomys nigrita (Lichtenstein, 1830)

Synonyms
- Akodon nigrita (Lichtenstein, 1829)

= Blackish grass mouse =

Species of rodent

The blackish grass mouse (Thaptomys nigrita) also formerly called the ebony akodont, is a rodent species from South America. It is found in Argentina, Brazil, Paraguay and Uruguay. It is the only species in the genus Thaptomys.
