= Desengano State Park =

State park in Rio de Janeiro, Brazil

- Parque Estadual do Desengano
- IUCN category II (national park)
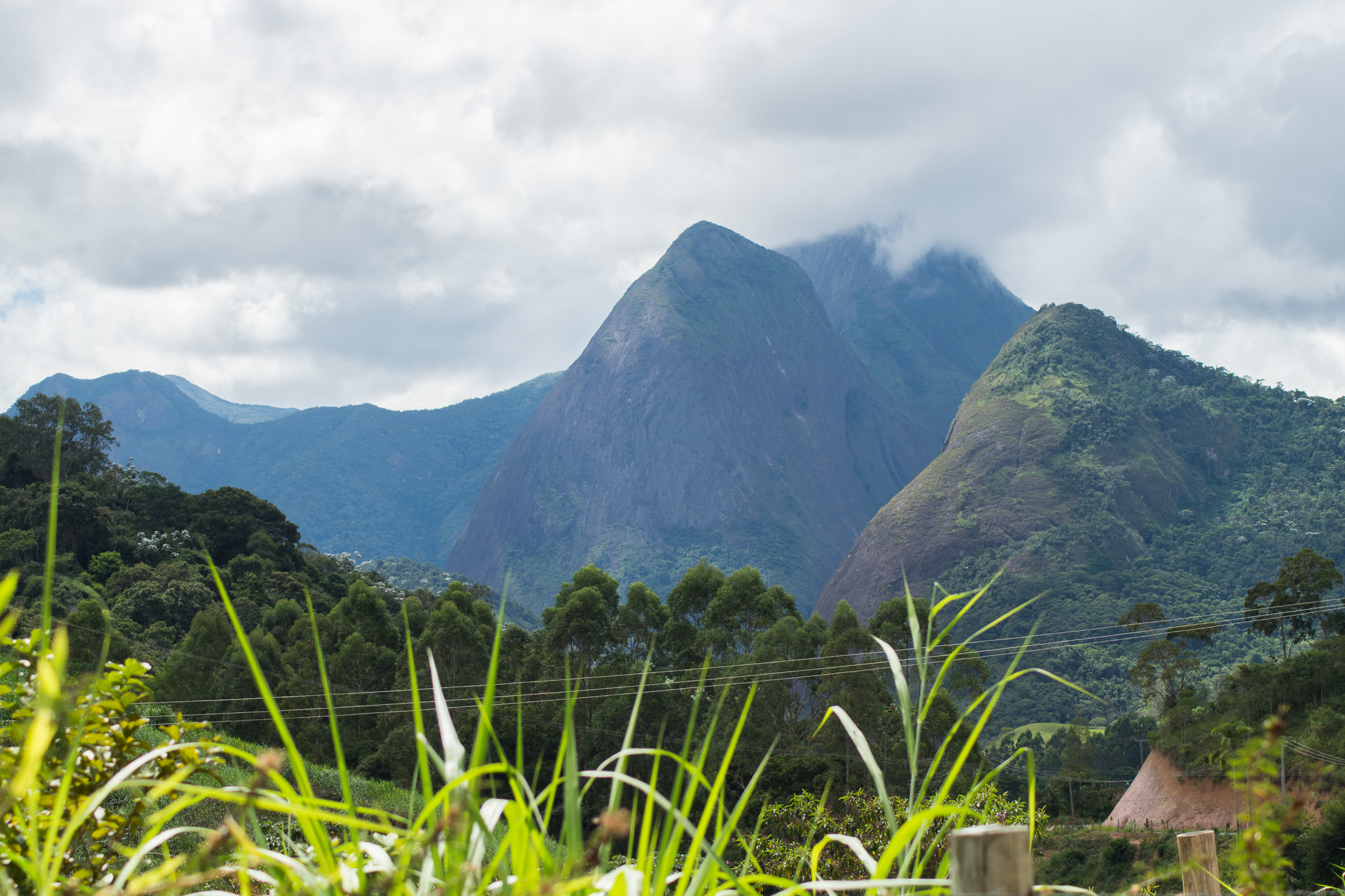
- Pedra do Desengano, the highest point

- Location within Brazil
- Nearest city: Santa Maria Madalena, Rio de Janeiro
- Coordinates: 21°51′56″S 41°54′04″W
- Area: 21,444 ha (82.80 sq mi)
- Designation: State park
- Created: 13 April 1970
- Administrator: Instituto Estadual do Ambiente RJ

The Desengano State Park (Portuguese: Parque Estadual do Desengano) is a state park in the state of Rio de Janeiro, Brazil. It protects an area of rugged mountains with a large remnant of Atlantic Forest that is home to various endangered species.

== Location ==
The Desengano State Park has an area of 21,444 hectares (52,990 acres) divided between the municipalities of Santa Maria Madalena, São Fidélis and Campos dos Goytacazes in the north of the state of Rio de Janeiro. Elevations range from 200 to 1,761 metres (656 to 5,778 ft). The rugged terrain includes ridges, pointed peaks, sugar loaf mountains and scarps with slopes of up to 75 degrees. Peaks include the Pico do Desengano 1,761 metres (5,778 ft), Pico São Mateus 1,576 metres (5,171 ft) and Pedra Agulha 1,080 metres (3,540 ft).

The park contains the sources of many water courses that supply settlements in the region. Waterfalls include the Vernec, Bonita and Tromba d'Água. The main rivers are the Rio Grande and its tributaries the Macapá and Santíssimo streams, the Colégio River, and the Segundo do Norte, Morumbeca, Aleluia and Mocotó rivers, tributaries of the Imbé River which feeds the Lagoa de Cima (Cima Lake). From that lake the Ururaí River flows to the Lagoa Feia.

== History ==
The Desengano State Park is the oldest conservation unit in Rio de Janeiro, created on 13 April 1970 by decree-law 250. State decree 7.121 of 28 December 28, 1983, republished in the Official Gazette of the State of Rio de Janeiro on 18 January 1984, established an environmental protection area that contained the area of Desengano State Park. The park is managed by the State Environmental Institute (Inea).

The park managers try to curb hunting and deforestation in the park and its surroundings. In June 2015 they seized 35 birds and a shotgun in the town of Monte Café. In October 2015 they found evidence of illegal logging in the town of Agulha do Imbé, in the municipality of Santa Maria Madalena, and charged the owner of the land with environmental crime.

== Environment ==
The Desengano State Park has great scenic beauty, with many rocky peaks and flora representative of the original Atlantic Forest biome. It holds the last continuous remnant of Atlantic Forest in the region. Vegetation includes dense submontane rainforest at altitudes from 200 to 500 metres (660 to 1,640 ft), dense montane rainforest from 500 to 1,500 metres (1,600 to 4,900 ft) and alpine meadows above 1,600 metres (5,200 ft).

About 410 species of birds have been found in the region. 283 species of birds are found in the well-preserved alpine meadows, of which 22 are endemic and have low populations. Endangered bird species include black-fronted piping guan (Pipile jacutinga), solitary tinamou (Tinamus solitarius), white-necked hawk (Buteogallus lacernulatus) and black-and-white hawk-eagle (Spizaetus melanoleucus). The Penelope, Tinamou, neotropical bellbird, black hawk-eagle (Spizaetus tyrannus) and red-browed amazon (Amazona rhodocorytha) are now only found in protected areas.

Mammals include maned sloth (Bradypus torquatus), cougar (Puma concolor), coati, lowland paca (Cuniculus paca), howler monkeys, nine-banded armadillo (Dasypus novemcinctus), tayra (Eira barbara), collared peccary (Pecari tajacu), white-lipped peccary (Tayassu pecari), titis, brown four-eyed opossum (Metachirus nudicaudatus), Robust capuchin monkeys, furão (Mustelidae species) and crab-eating raccoon (Procyon cancrivorus). In July 1999 the highly endangered muriqui was observed, causing great interest in the national and international scientific community and stimulating investment in research and conservation activities.

== See also ==
- List of mammals of Desengano State Park

== Sources ==
- Ecologus (April 2011), RAS Aterro São Fidélis, Governo do Rio de Janeiro - Secretaria do Ambeinte, GGKEY:2LCNTR39PUG
- Parque Estadual do Desengano (in Portuguese), Via Rural, archived from the original on January 13, 2017
- Upam Desengano flagra corte de madeira nativa em Santa Maria Madalena (in Portuguese), Inea: Instituto Estadual do Ambiente, 14 October 2015, archived from the original on 13 January 2017
