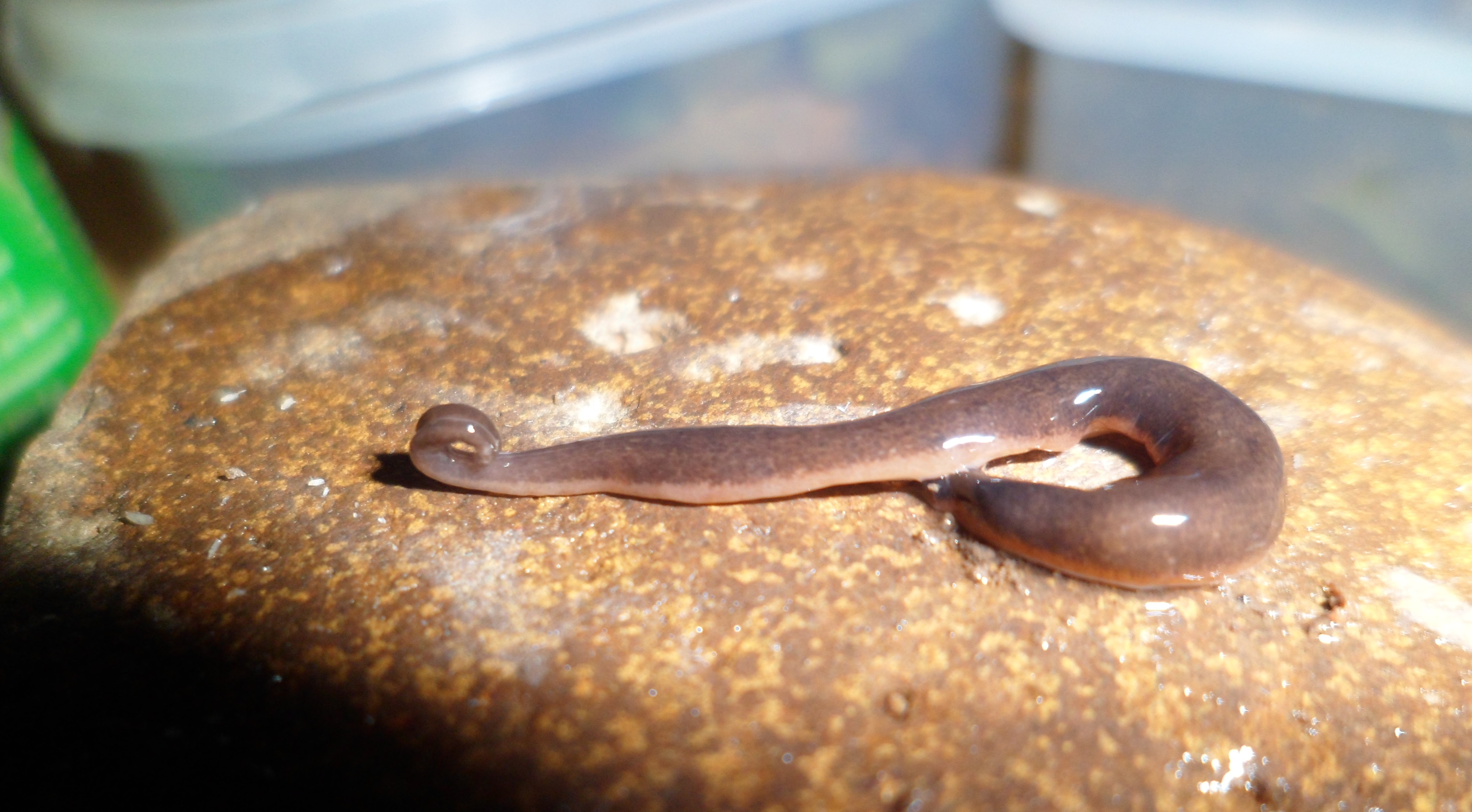

Scientific classification
- Kingdom: Animalia
- Phylum: Platyhelminthes
- Order: Tricladida
- Family: Geoplanidae
- Genus: Choeradoplana
- Species: C. benyai

Binomial name
- Choeradoplana benyai Lemos & Leal-Zanchet, 2014

= Choeradoplana benyai =

Species of flatworm

Choeradoplana benyai is a species of land planarian belonging to the subfamily Geoplaninae. It is found in areas of Atlantic Forest within Rio Grande do Sul, Brazil, such as São Francisco de Paula.

== Description ==
Choeradoplana benyai is a flatworm that can reach up to 60 mm in length and 2 mm in width. It has an elongate body with parallel margins. The anterior tip is obtuse and has a pair of dark brown glandular cushions on the ventral side; the posterior tip is pointed. The dorsal side of the body is a dark brown color; the base color underneath is light brown, which is visible on a thin median stripe, on the body's margins, and on irregular spots. The ventral side is a light brown color.

It is distinguished from other members of Choeradoplana by its dark brown color, having marginal and mainly pluriserial eyes lacking clear halos, sperm ducts that open into the lateral walls of the prostatic vesicle, a spherical intrabulbar prostatic vesicle with high folds and a narrow lumen in its front half, a long ejaculatory duct, a long, cylindrical penis papilla with a folded wall, a short male atrium occupied by the proximal half of the penis papilla, ovovitelline ducts that emerge laterally from the median third of the ovaries and ascend behind the gonopore, and male and female atria that have wide communication and independent musculatures.

== Etymology ==
The specific epithet of benyai was given in honor of MSc. Edward Benya, in "acknowledgment towards his laboratory work and friendship".
