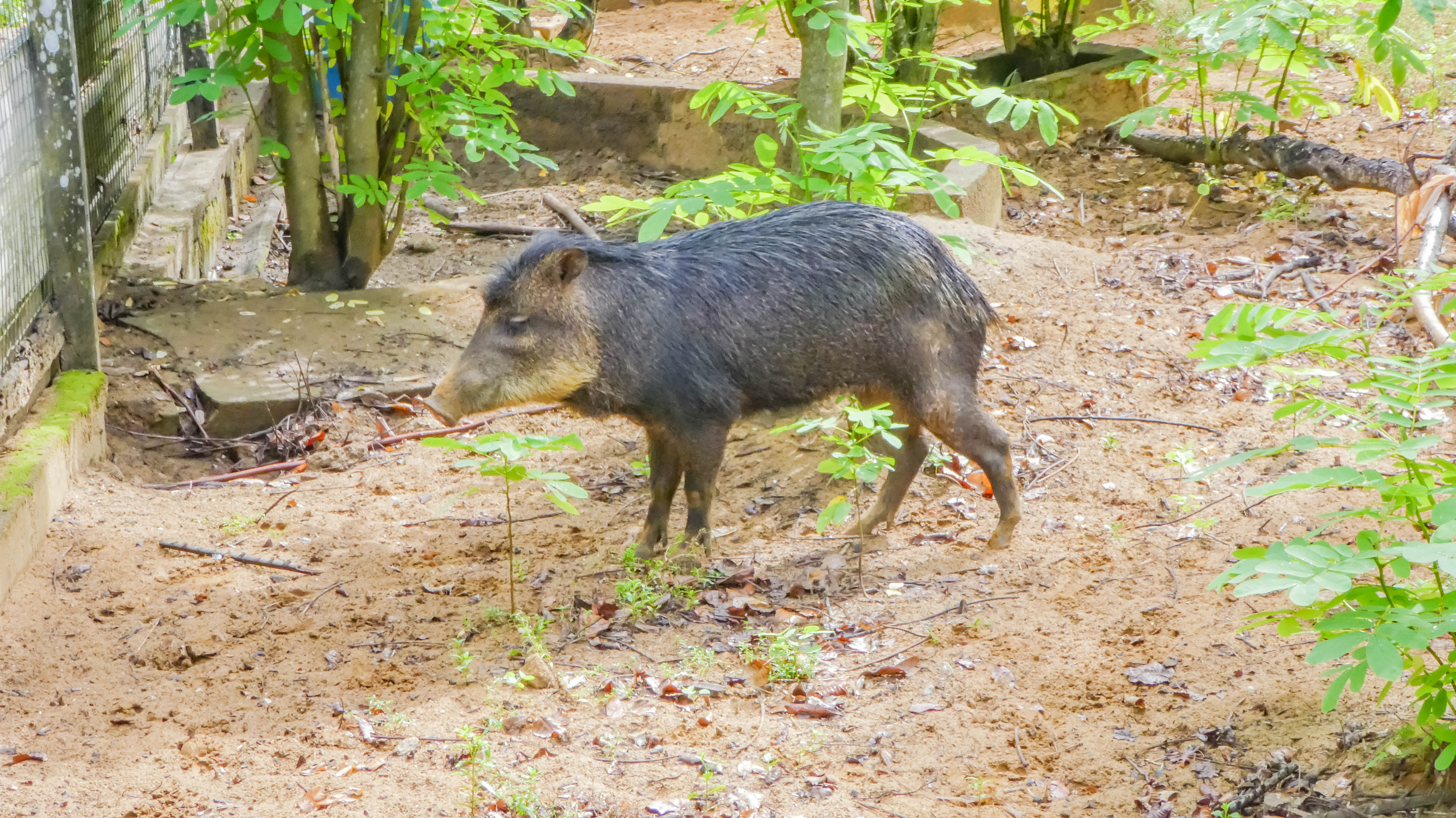
- Tayassu pecari

Scientific classification
- Kingdom: Animalia
- Phylum: Chordata
- Class: Mammalia
- Order: Artiodactyla
- Family: Tayassuidae
- Genus: Tayassu (Fischer von Waldheim, 1814)

Type species
- Tayassu pecari (Fischer von Waldheim, 1814)

Other species
- T. tajacu? Cuvier, 1817; †T. edensis (Frick, 1921)

Synonyms
- Dicotyles? G. Cuvier, 1817

= Tayassu =

Tayassu Temporal range: Late Hemphillian to recent, 9.4–0 Ma Possible not described Early Miocene records of cf. Dicotyles

Genus of mammal

Tayassu is a genus of peccary. The only extant species is the white-lipped peccary (Tayassu pecari). Collared peccary is suggested now as a possible member of same genus. At least one extinct species, T. edensis, has been placed in the genus. Many sources regard Dicotyles as a synonym. As of December 2025, the Paleobiology Database regarded Dicotyles as a separate genus.
