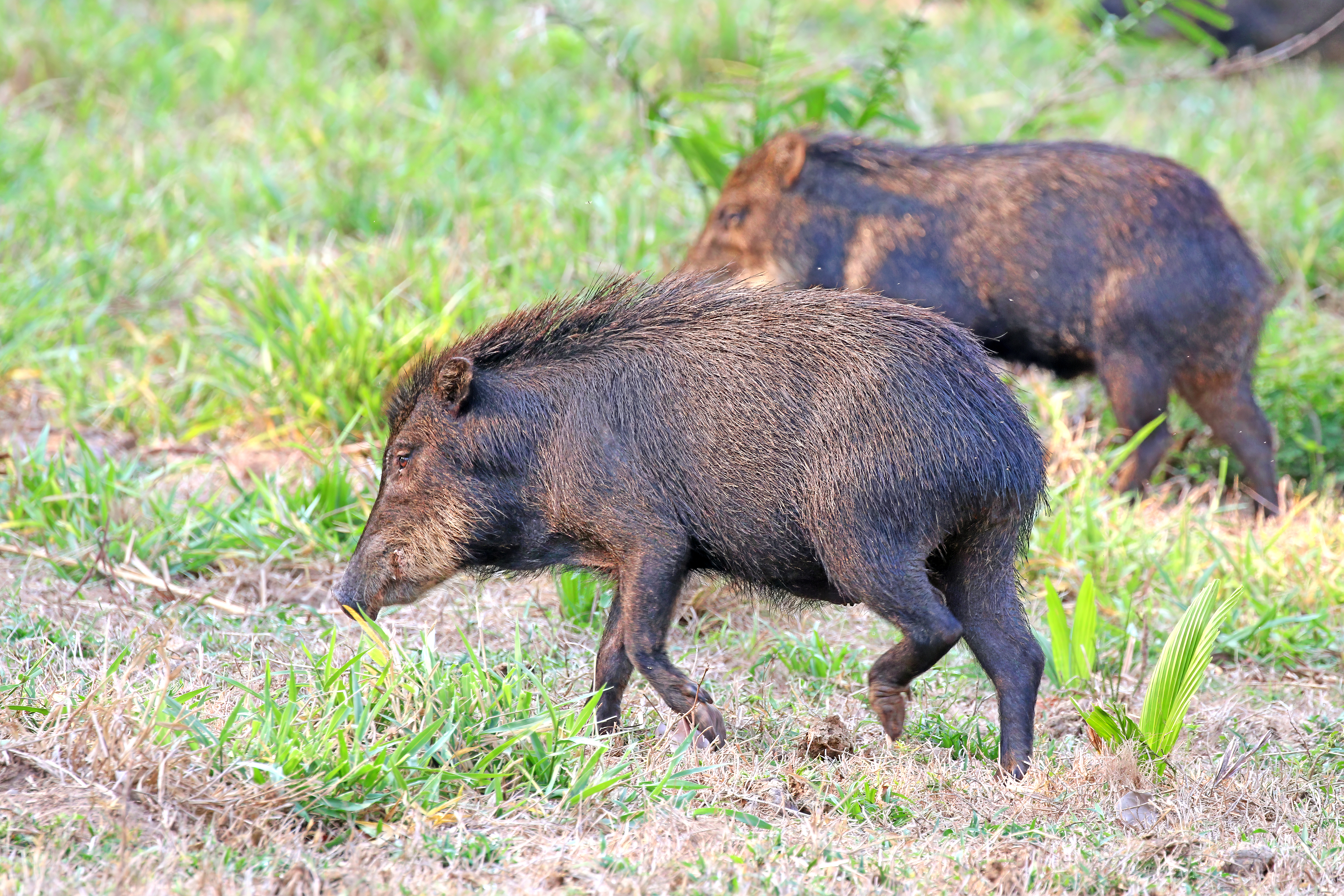

Conservation status
- Vulnerable (IUCN 3.1)
- CITES Appendix II

Scientific classification
- Kingdom: Animalia
- Phylum: Chordata
- Class: Mammalia
- Order: Artiodactyla
- Family: Tayassuidae
- Genus: Tayassu; Fischer von Waldheim, 1814
- Species: T. pecari

Binomial name
- Tayassu pecari (Link, 1795)
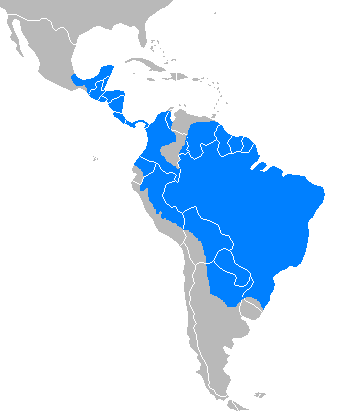
- Range of the white-lipped peccary (note that the Central American part of its range is much more fragmented in actuality and that its presence in El Salvador is erroneous)

Synonyms
- Of the genus: Dicotyles G. Cuvier, 1817; Of the species: Sus pecari (Link, 1795)

= White-lipped peccary =

White-lipped peccary Temporal range: Pliocene–present

Species of mammals belonging to the peccary family of even-toed ungulates

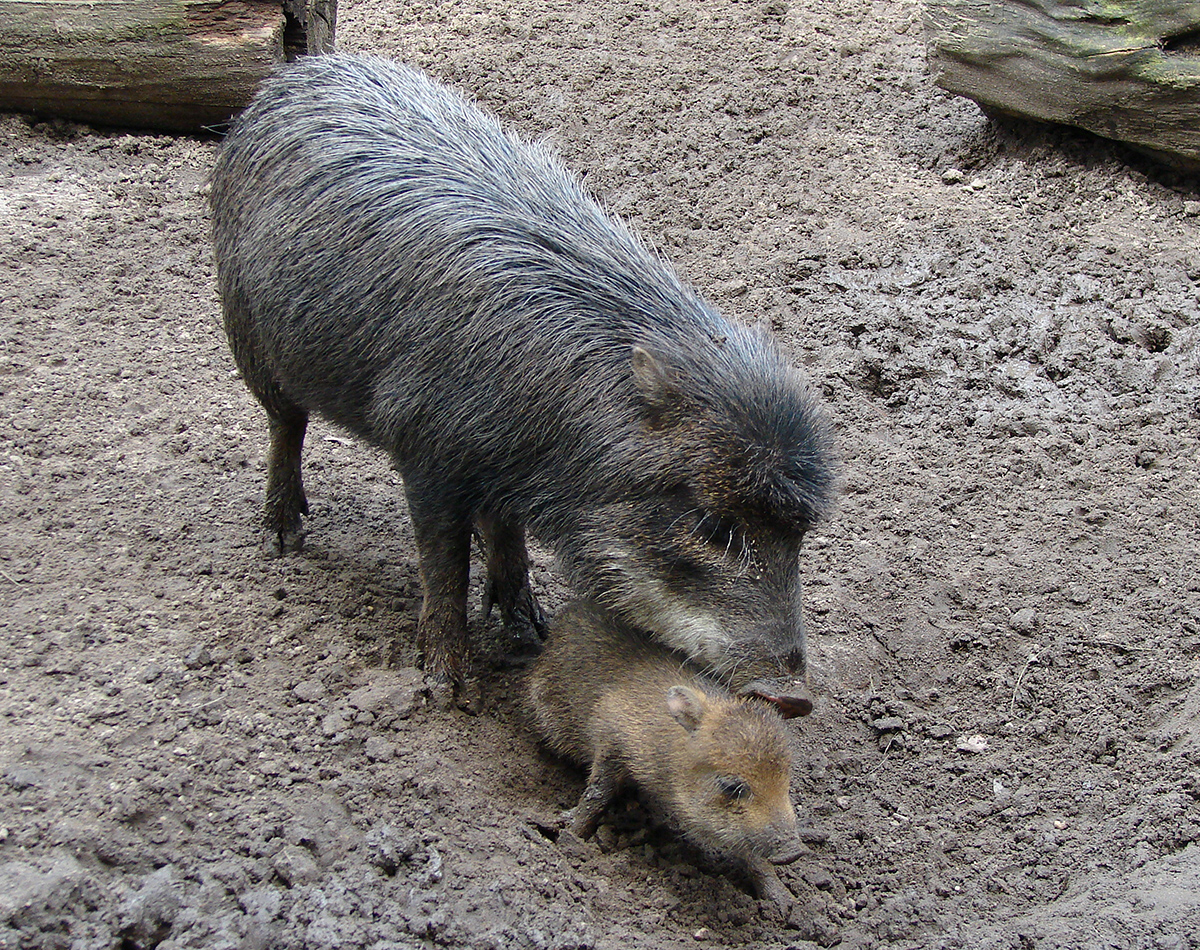

The white-lipped peccary (Tayassu pecari) is a species of peccary found in Central and South America and the only extant member of the genus Tayassu. (Note: Although identified by the American Society of Mammalogists as Dicotyles tajacu, some sources also describe the collared peccary as another member of Tayassu.) Multiple subspecies have been identified. Both males and females are covered in dark hair (except on certain regions, such as the throat, where it is cream). The range of T. pecari, which extends from Mexico to Argentina, has become fragmented, and the species's population is declining overall (especially in Mexico and Central America). They can be found in a variety of habitats. Social animals, white-lipped peccaries typically forage in large groups, which can have as many as 300 peccaries.

They are an important part of their ecosystem and multiple efforts are being made to preserve them in the wild. Not all disappearances are explained, but human activities play a role, with two major threats being deforestation and hunting; the latter is very common in rural areas. They are hunted for both their hide and meat.

== Taxonomy ==
The white-lipped peccary was first described by Johann Heinrich Friedrich Link in 1795 as Sus pecari. It was moved into the monotypic genus Tayassu by Gotthelf Fischer von Waldheim in 1814.

=== Subspecies ===
There are five recognized subspecies:

- T. p. pecari (Link, 1795)
- T. p. aequatoris (Lönnberg, 1921)
- T. p. albirostris (Illiger, 1815)
- T. p. ringens (Merriam, 1901)
- T. p. spiradens (Goldman, 1912)

=== Evolution ===
The fossil record of T. pecari is limited. It has existed since at least the Pliocene. Fossils from the Late Pleistocene suggest a different distribution during this time, being mostly found in more southern areas (such as the Buenos Aires Province of Argentina). Based on the other species that coexisted with it during this period, the central-northern Buenos Aires Province was likely arid or semi-arid in the Late Pleistocene.

=== Hybrids ===
The white-lipped peccary is capable of producing offspring with the collared peccary (Dicotyles tajacu), another member of the peccary family. This has been recorded at the London Zoo and Manaus Zoo, but never in the wild.

== Description ==
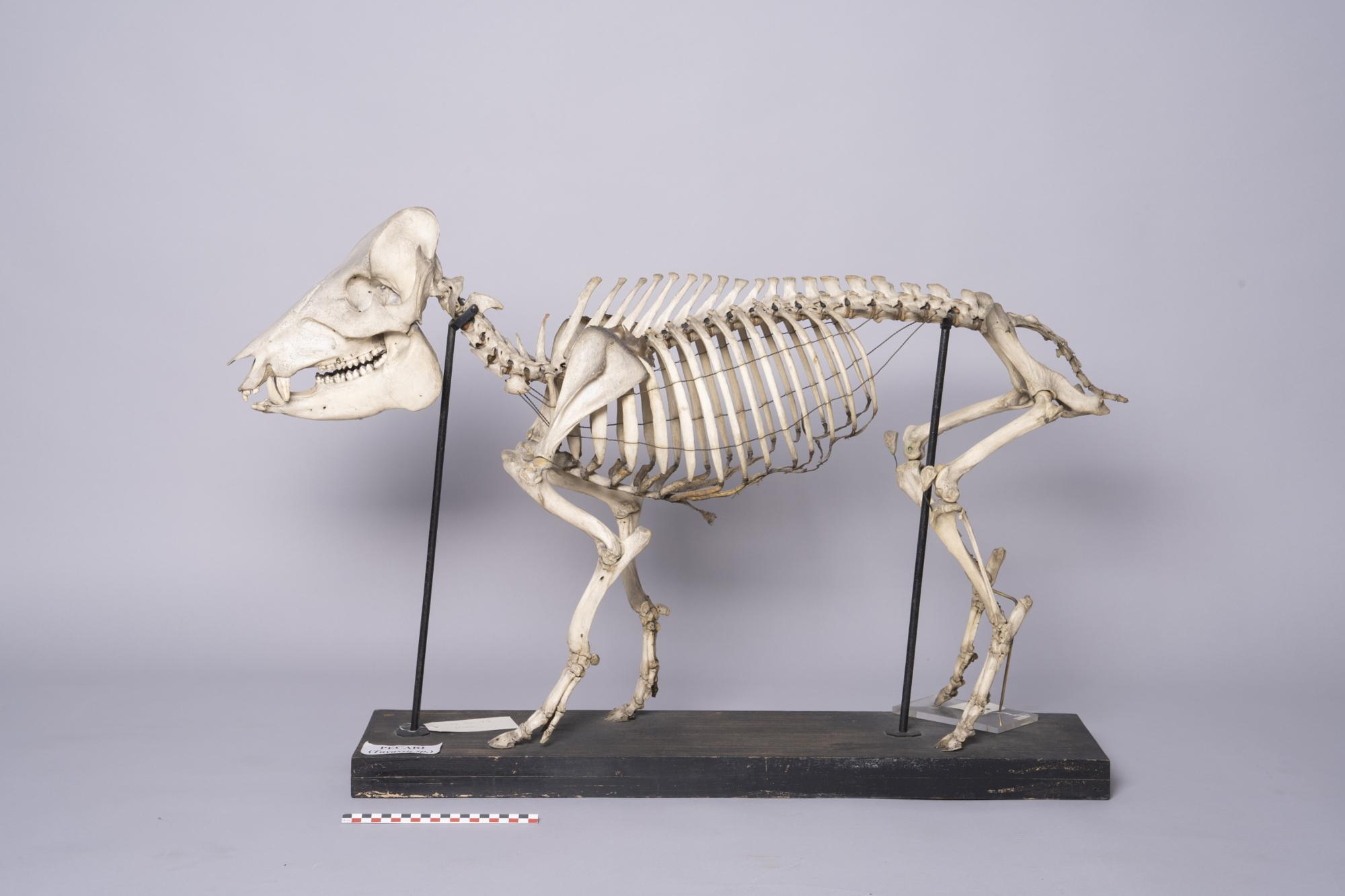
The skeleton

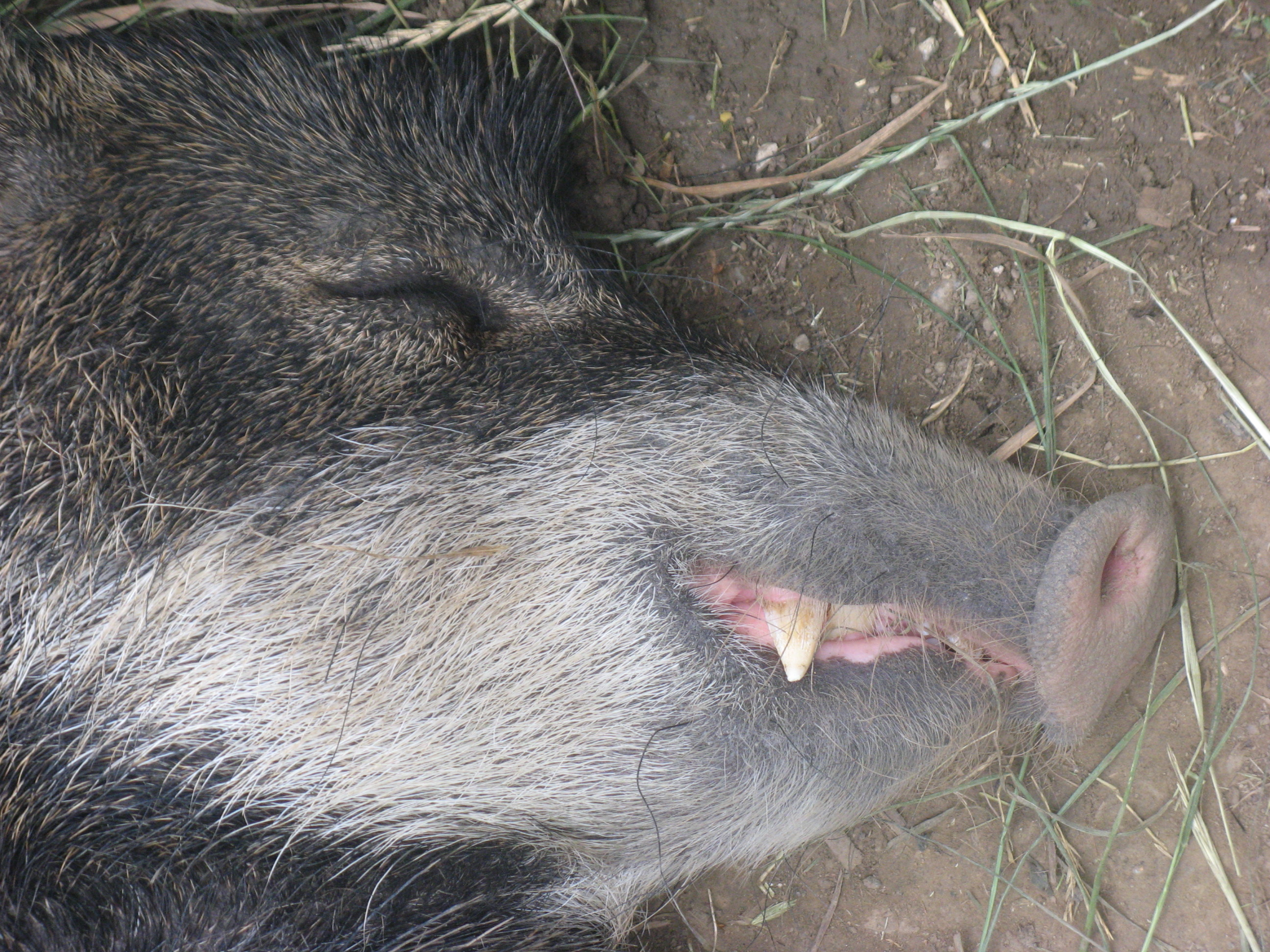
The head

The white-lipped peccary is a piglike ungulate, covered in dark hair, which is cream on certain parts of the underside, such as the throat and pelvic regions. Adult white-lipped peccaries can reach a length of 90–135 cm (35–53 in). Their height is about 90 cm (35 in), measured from the shoulder. They usually weigh 27–40 kg (60–88 lb), but can grow even larger. There is no obvious sexual dimorphism, but males have longer canine teeth than females. They possess a scent gland, which is found at the posterior middorsal region.

== Distribution and habitat ==
The white-lipped peccary is native to Argentina, Belize, Bolivia, Brazil, Colombia, Costa Rica, Ecuador, French Guiana, Guatemala, Guyana, Honduras, Mexico, Nicaragua, Panama, Paraguay, Peru, Suriname, and Venezuela. It is regionally extinct in El Salvador. White-lipped peccaries thrive in dense, humid, tropical forests. They can also be found in a wide range of other habitats, such as dry forests, grasslands, mangroves, and dry xerophytic areas, as well as the Cerrado ecoregion of Brazil. They range from sea level to an altitude of 1,900 m (6,200 ft). Their range overlaps with that of the collared peccary.

A 2018 study found that they had disappeared from 87% of their historical range in Mesoamerica (which the study defined as everywhere between southern Mexico and Panama), and were in "critical condition" in the seven Mesoamerican countries they still inhabited. Studies by the International Union for Conservation of Nature found similar information, with a reported decline of 89% in Costa Rica and 84% in Mexico and Guatemala.

== Behavior and ecology ==
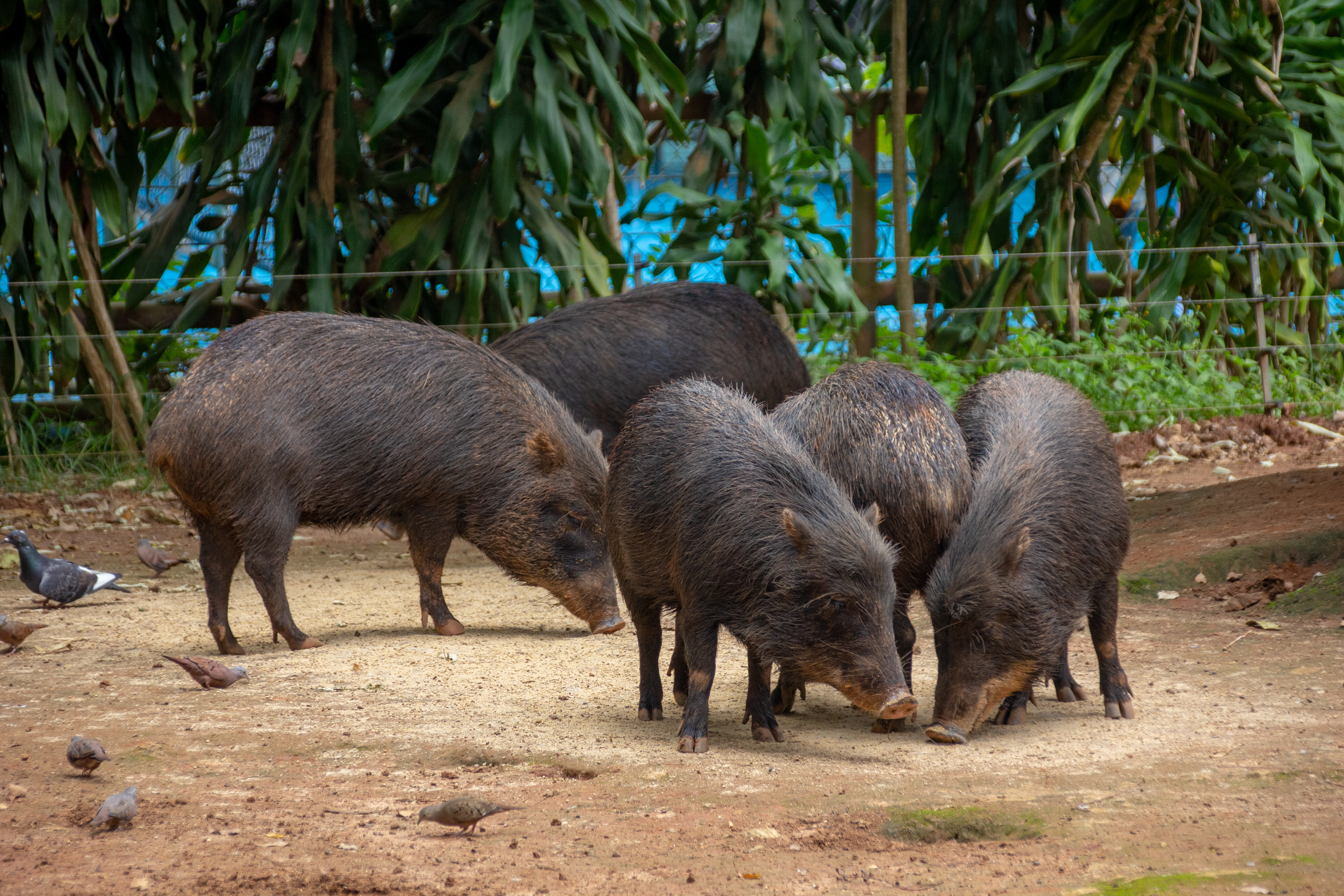
A group in São Paulo Zoo

White-lipped peccaries generally move from place to place in large herds. Unlike D. tajacu, which travels single-file, T. pecari moves in broad groups. Group sizes can range from under ten (while uncommon, groups as small as five have been recorded) to as many as 300. Especially large groups are rarer now than they were historically, due to the declining population of T. pecari. The average group size in a fragmented area of the Atlantic Forest was found to be around 42, although herds frequently come into contact with one another and interbreed. Juvenile peccaries have been found to make up no more than 20% of herds in studies.

As mentioned previously, the range of T. pecari overlaps with that of D. tajacu. This overlap is significant, with both found in similar habitats across the Neotropics. A study published in 1982 found that the former's bite force is at least 1.3 times as great as that of the collared peccary. This may help to explain how the two manage to coexist over such a large area, as the study also found that they consumed different kinds of seeds and nuts when foraging in the same area. The measured resistance of these seeds and nuts was found to be consistent with the bite forces of the two peccary species.

They can produce screaming noises and clack their teeth when they travel in herds, which allows them to be heard from hundreds of meters away facilitating "group coherence" and intimidating potential predators. In common with other peccaries, GBIF writes that "their vocal repertoire includes low-frequency barking, growling, moaning, high-pitched squealing, and tooth clacking."

=== Feeding ===
White-lipped peccaries forage for food, frequently doing so in coastal areas or near other bodies of water. Most of their diet is made up of fruit, although it is supplemented with additional foods, such as other parts of plants (which can include nuts), fungi, invertebrates (including snails), and even fish on occasion. They consume over 140 different species of plants from over 30 families across their range. While not as frequently, they are also known to feed on earthworms, eggs, small vertebrates, and carrion.

=== Predation ===
White-lipped peccaries are an important prey for large felines. When in large groups they can—and have been known to—drive away jaguars with their loud vocalizations.

=== Reproduction and life cycle ===
T. pecari breeds year-round. The estrus cycle generally lasts about 18—21 days. After a gestation period of about 158 days, two young are usually born. They are capable of moving with the rest of the herd just hours after birth.

== Conservation ==
The white-lipped peccary is listed as vulnerable by the IUCN. Its population is currently decreasing, despite protective measures. It is also listed on Appendix II on CITES and has been listed there since 1987.

=== Threats ===
The white-lipped peccary faces numerous threats. The large amount of space they require makes them very threatened by deforestation. They are highly dependent on protected areas to keep their habitat safe from human activity. When their habitat becomes fragmented, they are at more risk of being hunted by humans, as their tendency to move in large herds makes them easy to spot. Hunters can kill many at once. Even light hunting can be a threat in areas with limited resources and naturally lower population densities. In several areas of Brazil, seemingly healthy populations have become locally extinct. Their population has declined about 30% in the last 18 years, with current estimates suggesting a similar trend going into the future. Unexplained disappearances have been documented in multiple areas and are suspected to be caused by disease.

=== Conservation efforts ===
The white-lipped peccary already occurs in multiple protected areas, including the World Land Trust supported Güisayote Biological Reserve in Honduras and Manú National Park of Peru. However, that alone may not be enough to keep it alive in all the habitat types it is naturally found in. IUCN has suggested new limitations by CITES to restrict the trade of hides and pelts. Research on their population has increased in recent years, although there are still areas in need of study. Although Peru is very active in the trading of peccary hides, which are tanned in Peru and sold to European businesses to make shoes and gloves, the Wildlife Conservation Society (WCS) has worked in Peru since 1980 to keep hunting sustainable and monitor populations.

== Relationship with humans ==
T. pecari is frequently hunted by both the indigenous and non-indigenous residents of its habitat. Their meat, which is described by the Food and Agriculture Organization of the United Nations (FAO) as "white" and "abundant" is sold and consumed in rural communities, where peccaries (both white-lipped and collared) are important game animals. While easy to locate, due to their loud nature and tendency to travel in herds, white-lipped peccaries can be dangerous to hunt—they are known to kill dogs—and are typically hunted in groups. They generally stand their ground when attacked; as such, multiple individuals can be killed before the herd flees. Their scent gland is usually removed just after killing to avoid negatively affecting the taste of their meat. Peru permits their subsistence hunting in settlements with under 3,000 inhabitants.
