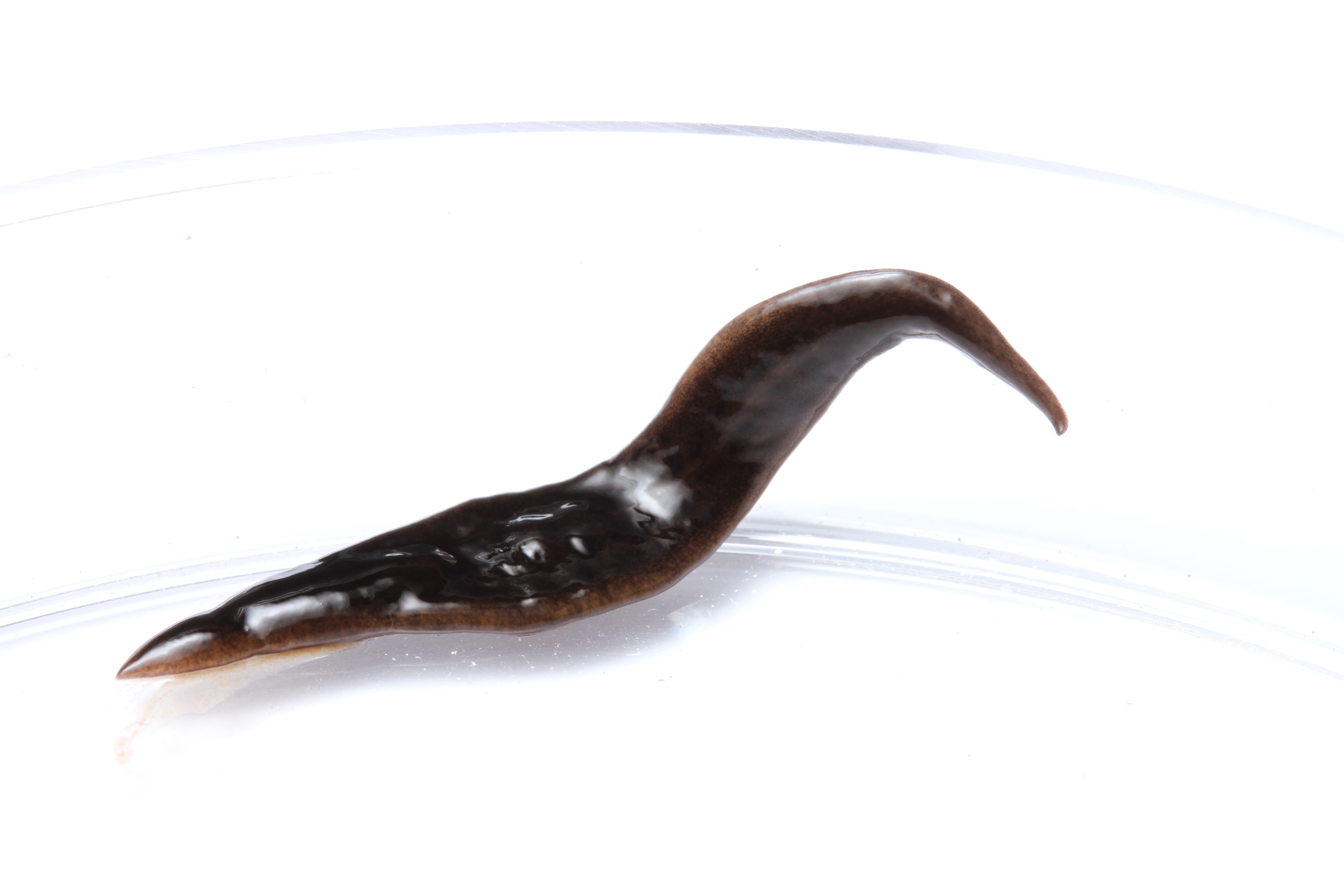
- Amaga pseudobama photographed live in North Carolina. Dorsal view, the head is on the right.

Scientific classification
- Kingdom: Animalia
- Phylum: Platyhelminthes
- Order: Tricladida
- Family: Geoplanidae
- Genus: Amaga
- Species: A. pseudobama

Binomial name
- Amaga pseudobama Justine, Gastineau, Gey, Robinson, Bertone & Winsor, 2024

= Amaga pseudobama =

Species of flatworm

Amaga pseudobama is a species of land planarian in the subfamily Geoplaninae.

== Description ==
Amaga pseudobama is 19–28 mm in length. The body is broadly lanceolate with tapered extremities, the color is dark brown dorsally and light brown ventrally.

The authors of the species explained that "on the basis of examination of photographs of the live specimens only, the specimens were first considered as belonging to Obama nungara, a species originally from South America, which has now invaded a large part of Europe."

== Etymology ==
According to the authors of the taxon, the specific epithet "alludes to the species being initially identified from photographs as the darkly pigmented form of Obama nungara.

== Distribution ==
Amaga pseudobama was first found in 2020 in a plant nursery in Kinston, North Carolina, USA, in pots coming from another nursery in Georgia, USA. Specimens were also collected in Fort Myers, Florida, in 2015. Observations from citizen science suggest that the species could also be present in California and Texas.

The species is thus widespread in several states of Southern USA. Its origin is unknown, but it is known that members of the genus Amaga are all from various countries in South America.

== Ecology ==
As other land flatworms, this animal is probably a predator of other small animals, but currently nothing is known about its prey.

== Molecular information ==
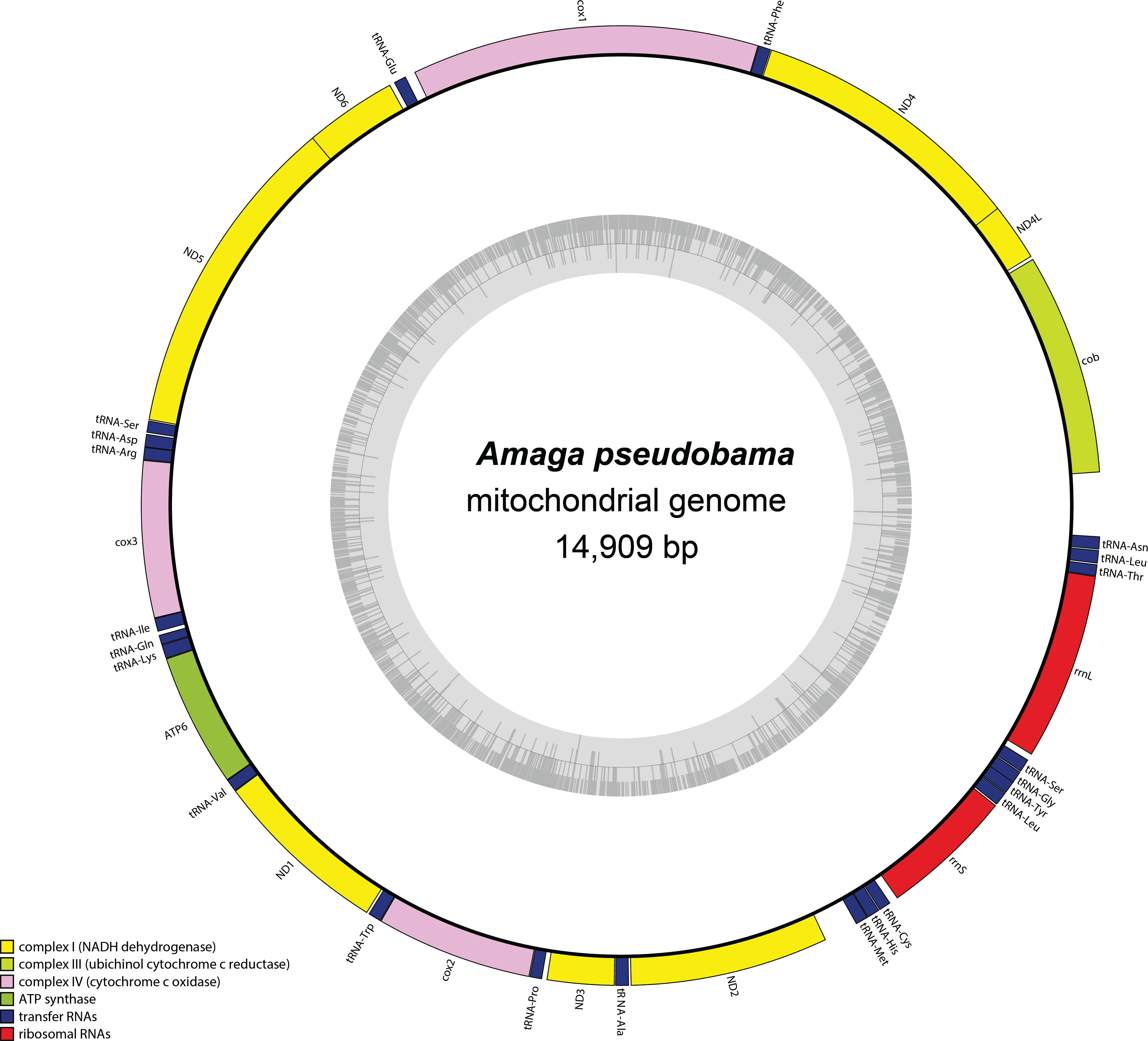
The mitogenome of Amaga pseudobama

The complete mitogenome of Amaga pseudobama encodes for 12 protein coding genes, 2 rRNA and 22 tRNA and is colinear with those of other Geoplanidae. The Elongation Factor 1-alpha gene, 18S and 28S genes were also characterised.

Molecular phylogenies based on mitochondrial proteins or other genes associated Amaga pseudobama with Amaga expatria and differentiated it from Obama nungara, within a robust clade including these three Geoplaninae.
