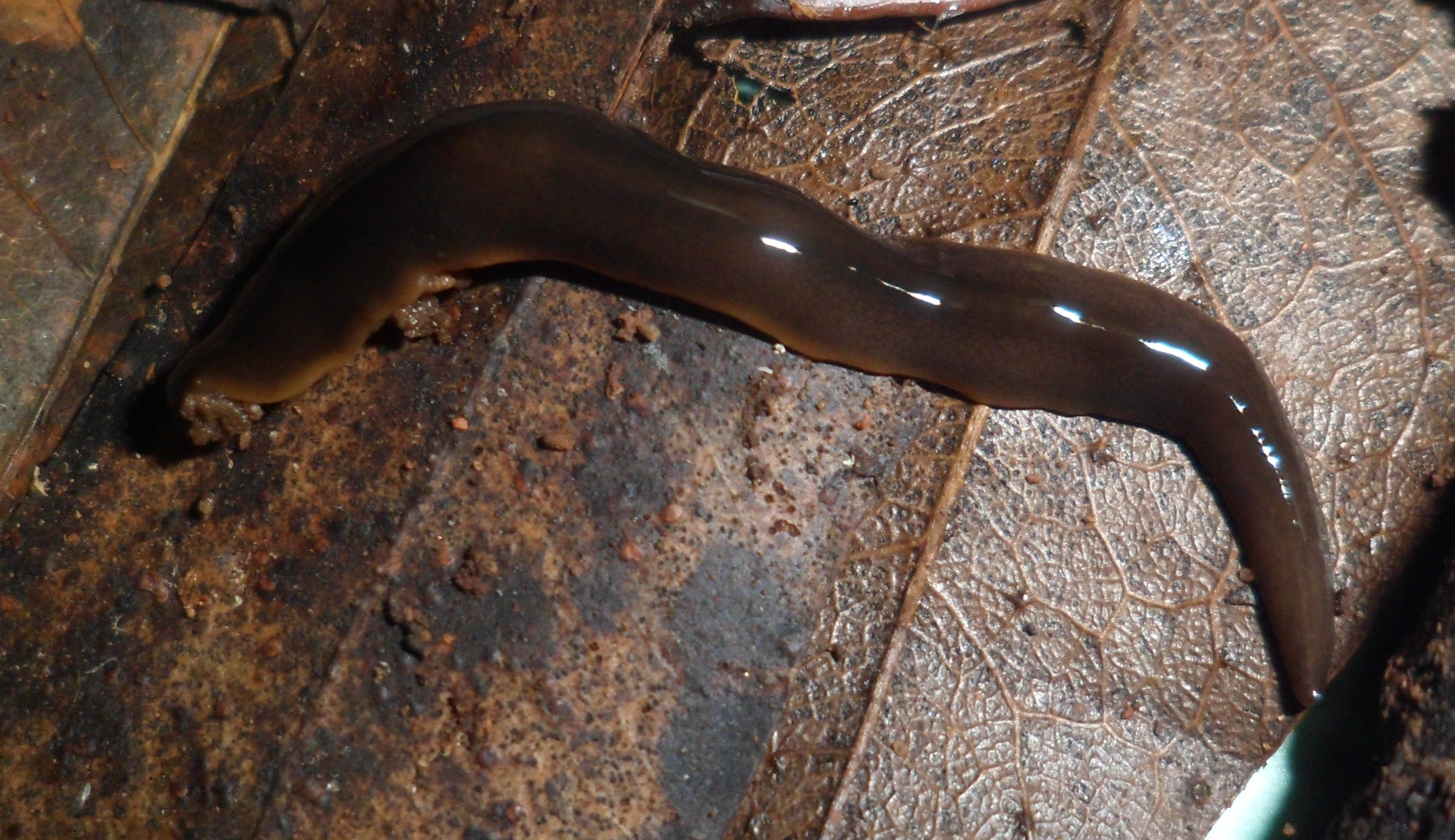

Scientific classification
- Kingdom: Animalia
- Phylum: Platyhelminthes
- Order: Tricladida
- Family: Geoplanidae
- Genus: Obama
- Species: O. anthropophila

Binomial name
- Obama anthropophila Amaral, Leal-Zanchet & Carbayo, 2015

Synonyms
- Geoplana ladislavii sensu Froehlich, 1959 (in part)

= Obama anthropophila =

Species of flatworm

Obama anthropophila is a species of Brazilian land planarian in the subfamily Geoplaninae. It is a very common land planarian in human-disturbed environments in southern and southeastern Brazil.

== Description ==
Obama anthropophila is a medium-sized land planarian with a lanceolate body. The largest specimens have a length of about 70 millimetres (2.8 in) or more. The dorsum varies from dark to light brown, becoming lighter towards the body margins. In some cases, the dorsum may be a greenish-brown. The ventral side is pale grey or brown and has a darker margin that is a continuation of the color of the dorsum. It is very similar in appearance to the closely related Obama decidualis and Obama ladislavii, the main difference with the latter being the color.

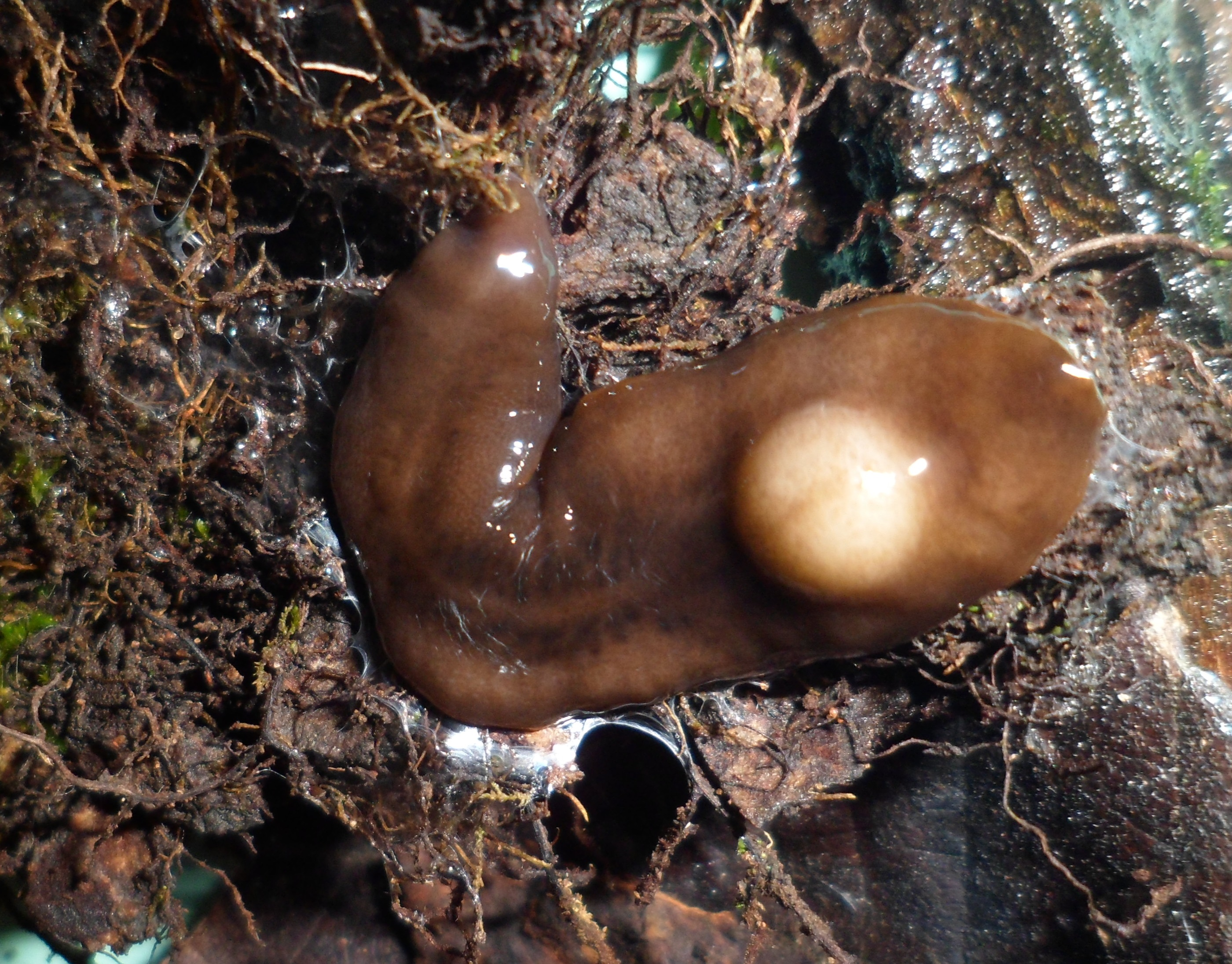
Mature specimen of Obama anthropophila about to lay an egg case. The mature testes are clearly visible as two rows of irregular dark spots on the dorsum.

The numerous of eyes of O. anthropophila are distributed marginally on the first millimeters of the body and posteriorly become dorsal, occupying almost the entire body width at the median third. Posteriorly they become less numerous. The dorsal eyes are surrounded by a region without pigmentation (halo), which can be visible on darker individuals through fine inspection as a set of small light dots.

On fully mature specimens, two irregular rows of spots with a darker tinge may be seen on the first half of the body. Those rows are the many dorsal testicles visible through the body.

The sensory pits are simple invaginations arranged in a single row on the side of the body. The glandular margin composes two types of secretory cells, containing coarse erythrophil granules, or those that easily stain red, and xanthophil secretions, or those that easily stain yellow. Some cyanophil glands and fine granules are present as well. The pharynx is cylindrical.

== Etymology ==
The specific epithet is derived from the Greek language words άνθρωπος (ánthropos), "man", and φίλος (fílos), "loved", in reference to the man-disturbed habitats where the type specimens were discovered.

== Distribution ==
Obama anthropophila has been recorded in southern and southeastern Brazil, from São Paulo to Rio Grande do Sul. It is mainly found in human-disturbed environments and at the border of native subtropical forests.

In 2025, the species was recorded for the first time out of its native range, in the Netherlands, its first record in Europe.

== Diet ==
In the laboratory, O. anthropophila captures and consumes small land gastropods, including some agricultural pests, such as Bradybaena similaris, Cornu aspersum and Deroceras laeve. It also feeds on other land planarians, such as Luteostriata abundans, which probably constitute its main native prey, and invasive species, such as Dolichoplana carvalhoi and Endeavouria septemlineata. On rare occasions, it may even prey on other species of the same genus, such as Obama ladislavii.
