= Amaga =

Amagá is a town and municipality in Antioquia Department, Colombia.

Amaga may also refer to:

- Amaga (flatworm), a genus of land planarians from South America
- Australian Museums and Galleries Association (AMaGA)
