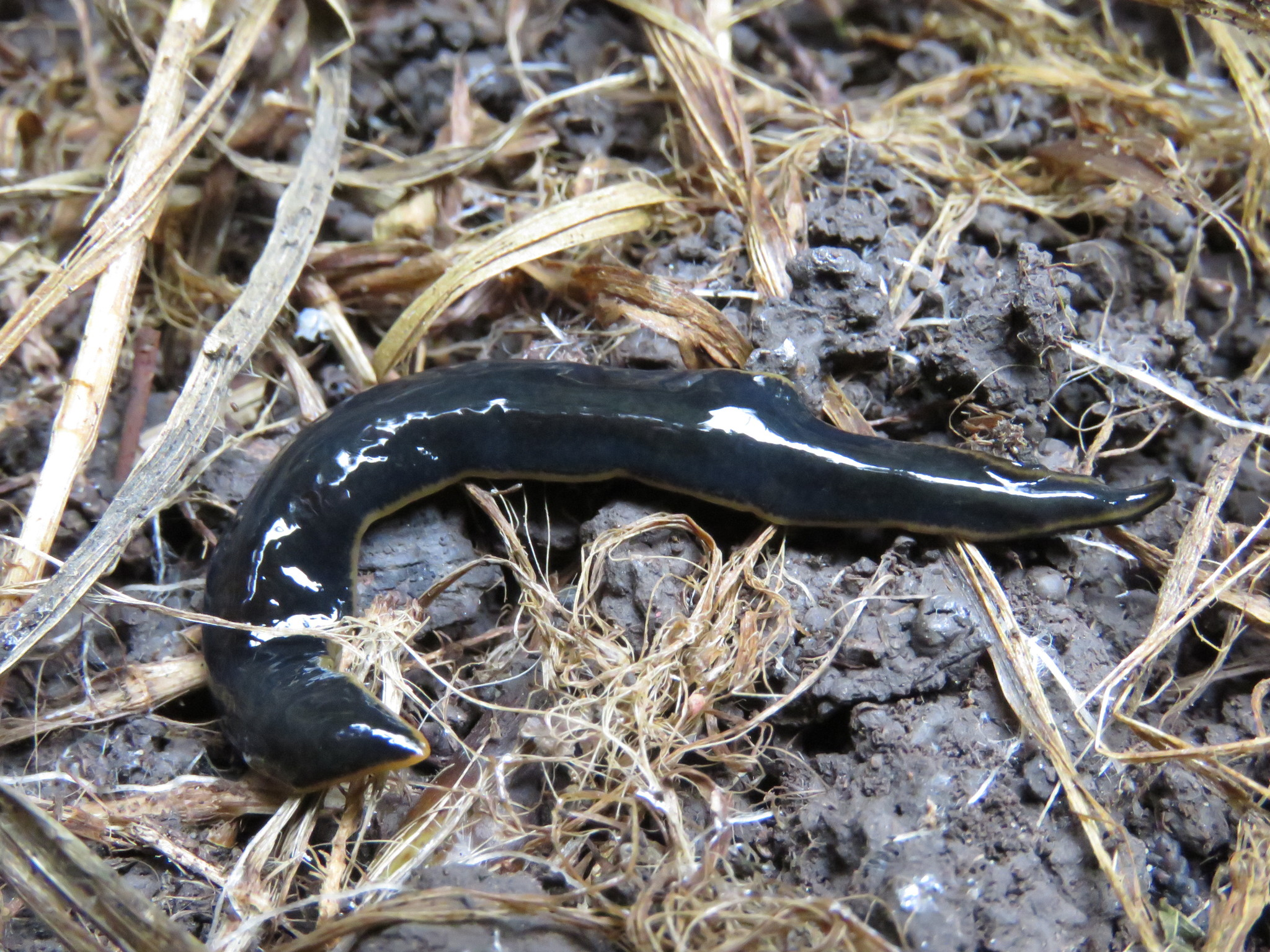
- Amaga becki

Scientific classification
- Kingdom: Animalia
- Phylum: Platyhelminthes
- Order: Tricladida
- Family: Geoplanidae
- Subfamily: Geoplaninae
- Genus: Amaga; Ogren & Kawakatsu, 1990

Type species
- Geoplana amagensis Fuhrmann, 1914

= Amaga (flatworm) =

Genus of flatworms

Amaga is a genus of land planarians from South America.

== Description ==
The genus Amaga was erected by Robert E. Ogren and Masaharu Kawakatsu to include Neotropical land planarians with an intra-antral penis papilla, i.e., small penis papilla at the proximal end of a folded male atrium.

A later redescription of the type species, Amaga amagensis, revealed that the intra-antral penis papilla is not a permanent structure as previously thought. The remaining species currently in the genus need a taxonomic re-evaluation and may be transferred to new genera in the future. After more analyses, including new species, a new diagnosis of the genus describes it as Geoplaninid land planarians with dorsal testes, copulatory apparatus with an extrabulbr prostatic vesicle and lacking a permanent penis, the ovovitelline ducts entering the female atrium dorsally either separately or through a very short common duct. Many species include glandular or musculo-glandular organs on the walls of the male atrium. However, many species currently in the genus do not match these diagnostic features, and their position within the genus needs further studies.

== Etymology ==
The name Amaga comes from the specific epithet, amagensis, of the type-species, originally described as Geoplana amagensis due to its occurrence in the proximities of Amagá, Colombia.

== Invasive species ==
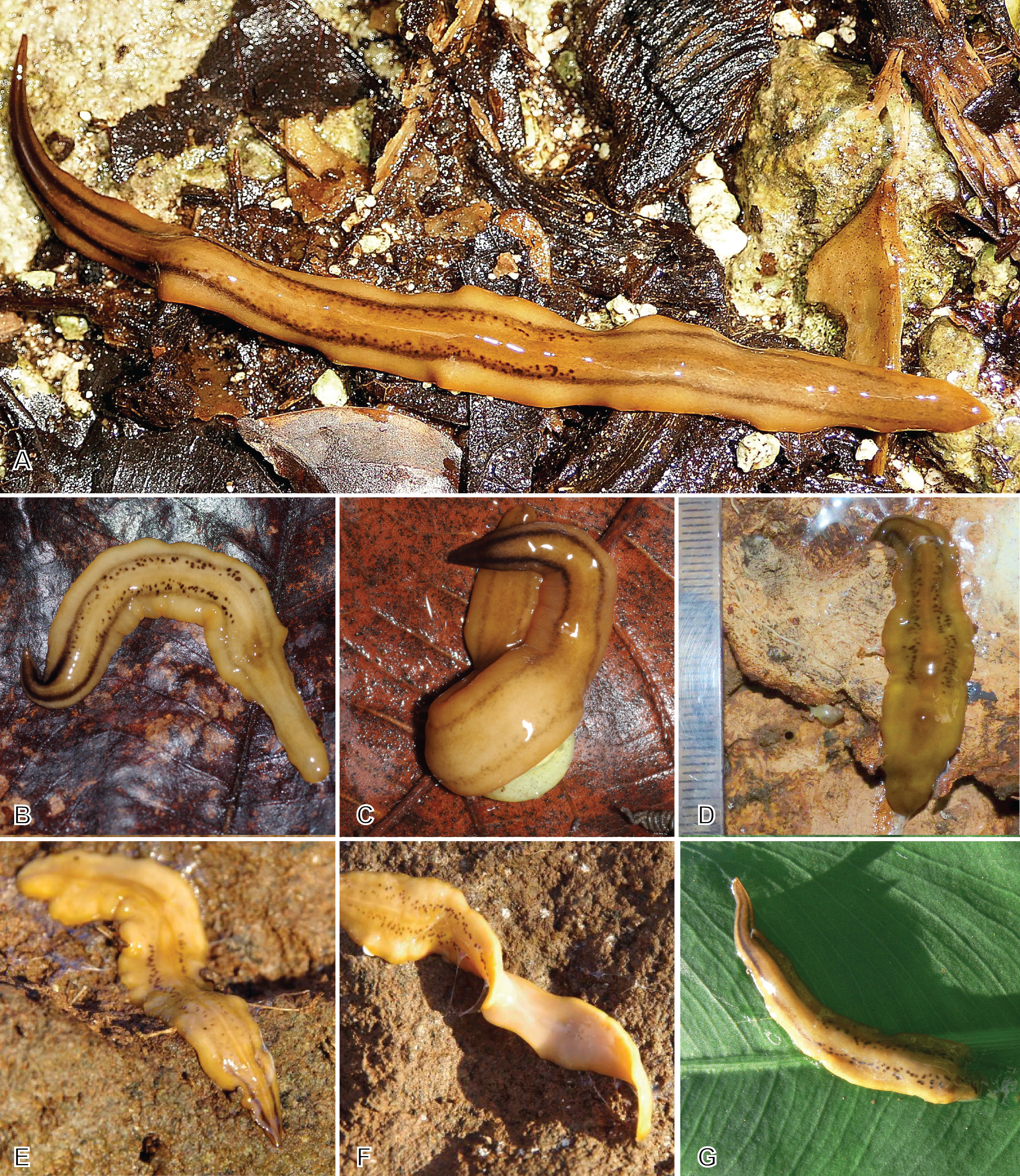
The land flatworm Amaga expatria in Guadeloupe

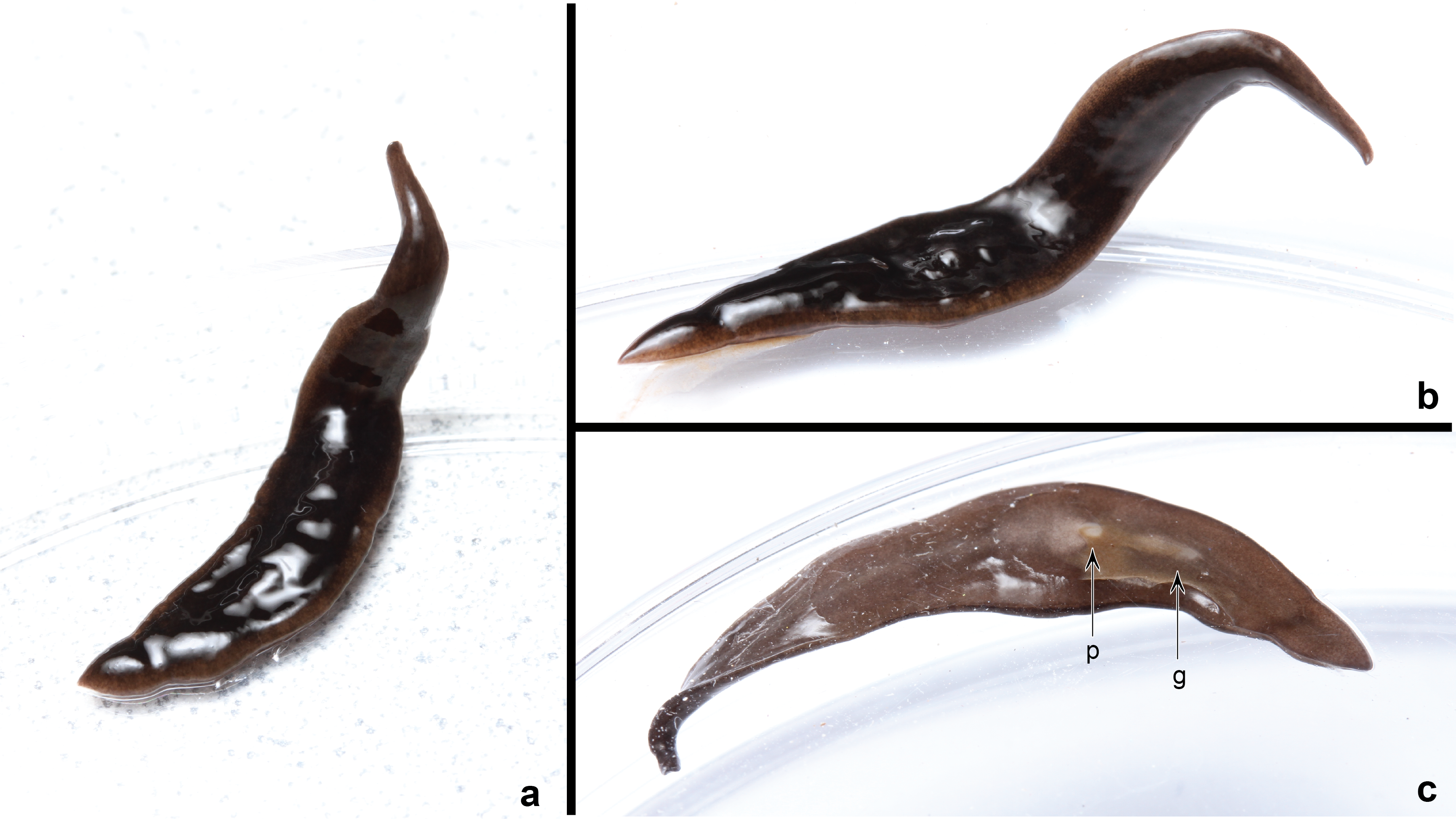
Amaga pseudobama in North Carolina

Most species of Amaga have been found in their country of origin in continental South America. However, Amaga expatria has been discovered in the Bermuda and has never been found in South America. In 2020, a study showed that the species was present in many locations in the islands of Guadeloupe and Martinique. Amaga expatria feeds on earthworms and snails.

Amaga pseudobama has been discovered in North Carolina, Georgia and Florida in the USA. Its country of origin, probably in South America, is unknown.

== Genetics ==
The complete mitochondrial genome of Amaga expatria has been analysed. It is 14,962 bp in length and contains 12 protein coding genes, two rRNA genes and 22 tRNA genes. The mitogenome was compared with the few available mitogenomes from geoplanids and the most similar was Obama nungara, a species from South America.

The complete mitogenome of Amaga pseudobama also encodes for 12 protein coding genes, 2 rRNA and 22 tRNA and is colinear with those of other Geoplanidae. The Elongation Factor 1-alpha gene, 18S and 28S genes were also characterised.

== Species ==
The following species are accepted in the genus Amaga:

- Amaga aglandulosa Oliveira, Álvarez-Presas & Carbayo, 2025
- Amaga amagensis (Fuhrmann, 1912)
- Amaga becki (Fuhrmann, 1912)
- Amaga bogotensis (Graff, 1899)
- Amaga bussoni (Froehlich, 1959)
- Amaga contamanensis (Hyman, 1955)
- Amaga expatria Jones & Sterrer, 2005
- Amaga libbieae (Du Bois-Reymond Marcus, 1958)
- Amaga olivacea Schultze & Müller, 1857
- Amaga ortizi (Fuhrmann, 1912)
- Amaga pseudobama Justine, Gastineau, Gey, Robinson, Bertone & Winsor, 2024
- Amaga righii (Froehlich & Froehlich, 1972)
- Amaga vesiculosa Oliveira, Álvarez-Presas & Carbayo, 2025
