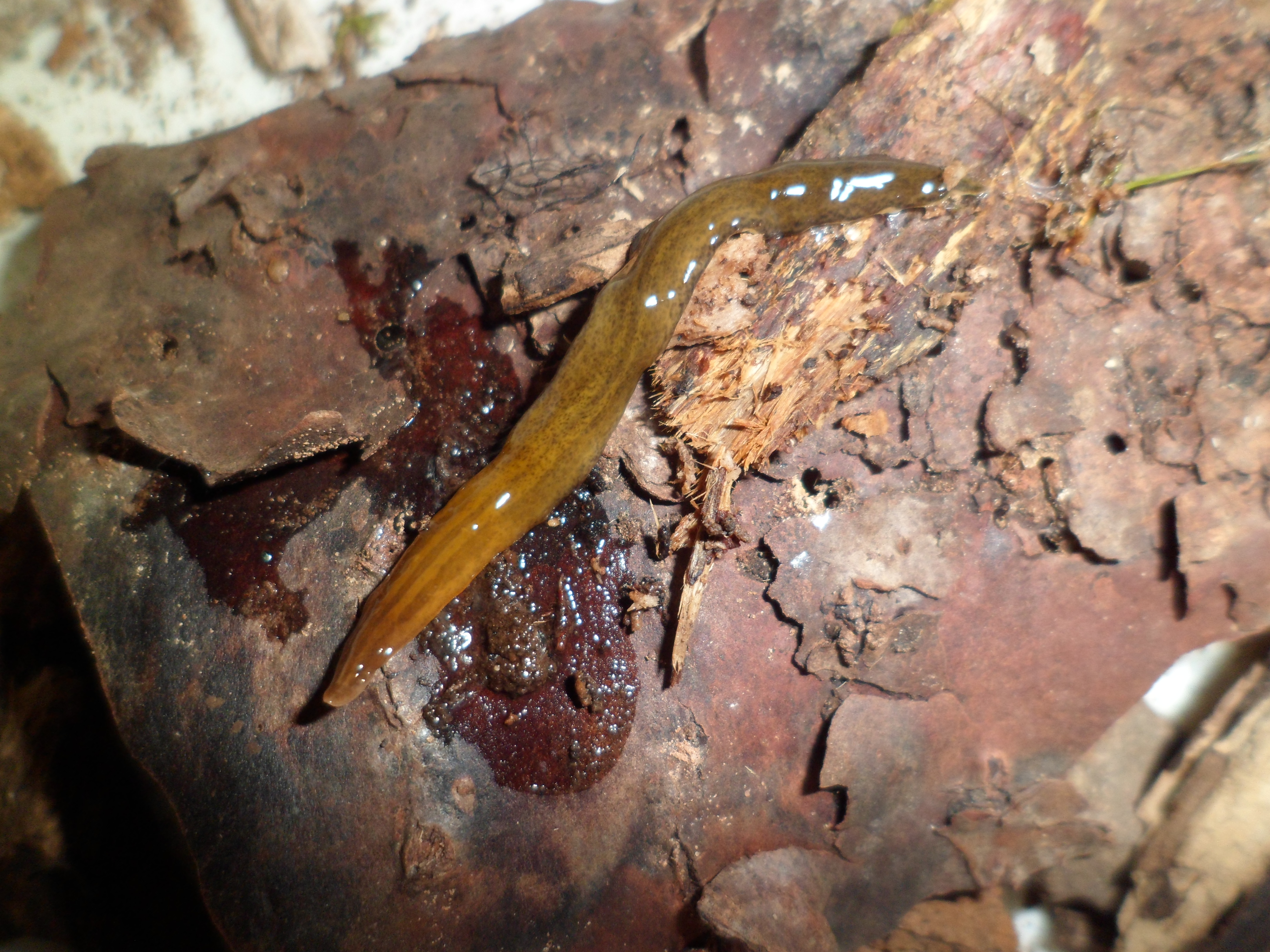

Scientific classification
- Kingdom: Animalia
- Phylum: Platyhelminthes
- Order: Tricladida
- Family: Geoplanidae
- Genus: Obama
- Species: O. josefi

Binomial name
- Obama josefi (Carbayo & Leal-Zanchet, 2001)

Synonyms
- Geoplana josefi Carbayo & Leal-Zanchet, 2001

= Obama josefi =

Species of flatworm

Obama josefi is a species of Brazilian land planarian in the subfamily Geoplaninae.

== Description ==
Obama josefi has a lanceolate body, very flat in larger specimens, which may reach 130 mm in length, although most specimens are smaller.

The color of O. josefi varies according to its age, a phenomenon known as etary polymorphism.

In young specimens, the dorsal ground color is yellowish. A dark-brown to black median stripe runs longitudinally along the body. Additionally, there is a wide lateral longitudinal band of the same color of the stripe on each side. The stripe and the bands usually do not reach the anterior tip, which has an orange tinge more or less concentrated, sometimes forming a dense zone that resembles a collar.

As the animal enters sexual maturation, the dorsum starts to accumulate dark flecks behind the orange anterior end, so that the yellow and dark pattern of stripes becomes less conspicuous. In fully mature specimens, the number of flecks is high enough so that the dorsum appears to be of a uniform greenish dark-brown color. However, the anterior end continues to have an orange appearance, although usually darker than in the younger specimens.

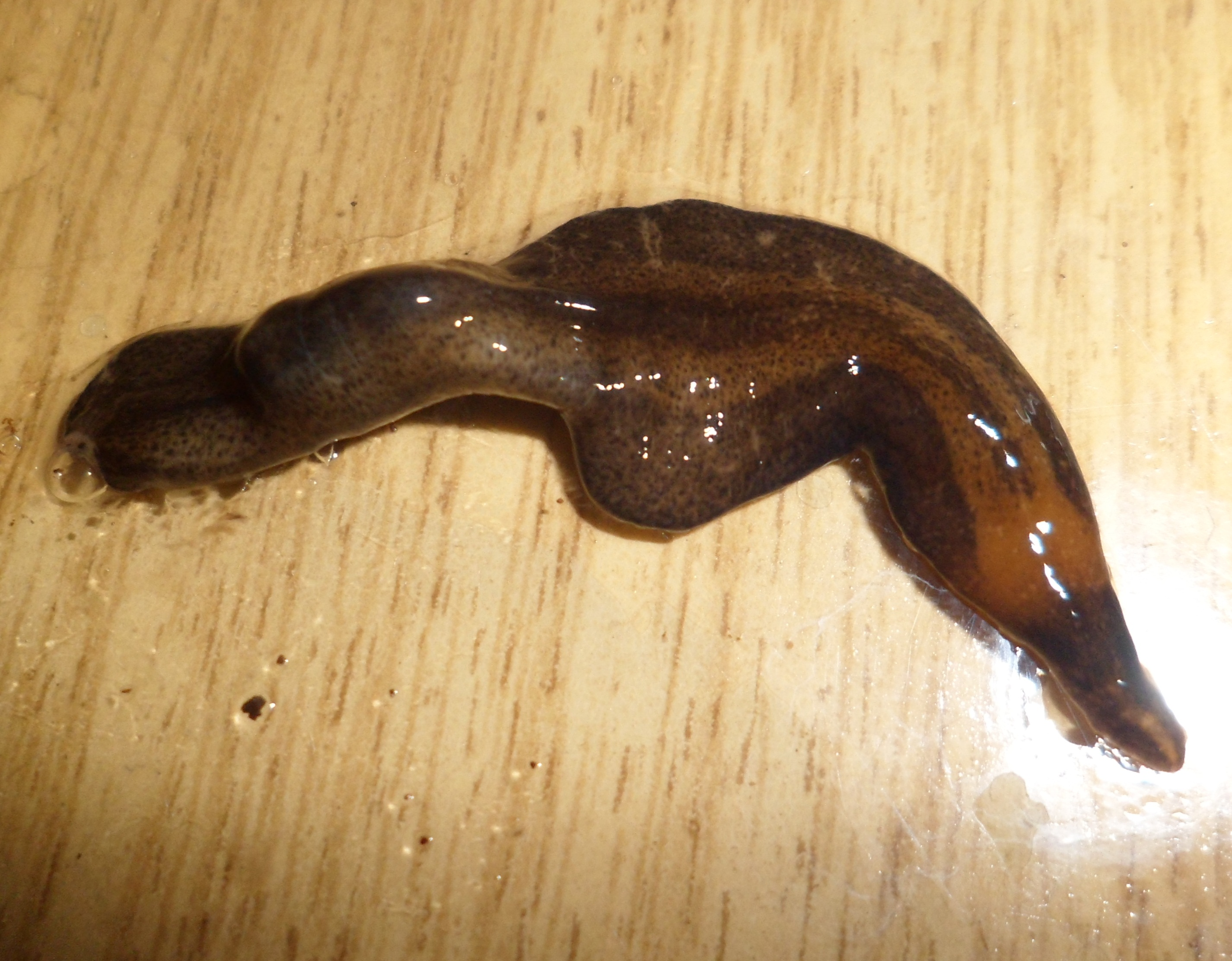
Obama josefi eating Endeavouria septemlineata (not visible). The contracted area of the body forms a "tunnel" that holds the prey.

== Distribution ==
The habitat of O. josefi includes moist and seasonal forests in northeast Rio Grande do Sul and east Santa Catarina, southern Brazil.

== Etymology ==
The specific epithet josefi honors Dr. Josef Hauser S. J., founder of the Institute of Planarian Research at Unisinos.

== Diet ==
In laboratory experiments, O. josefi captured and consumed the invasive land planarian Endeavouria septemlineata.
