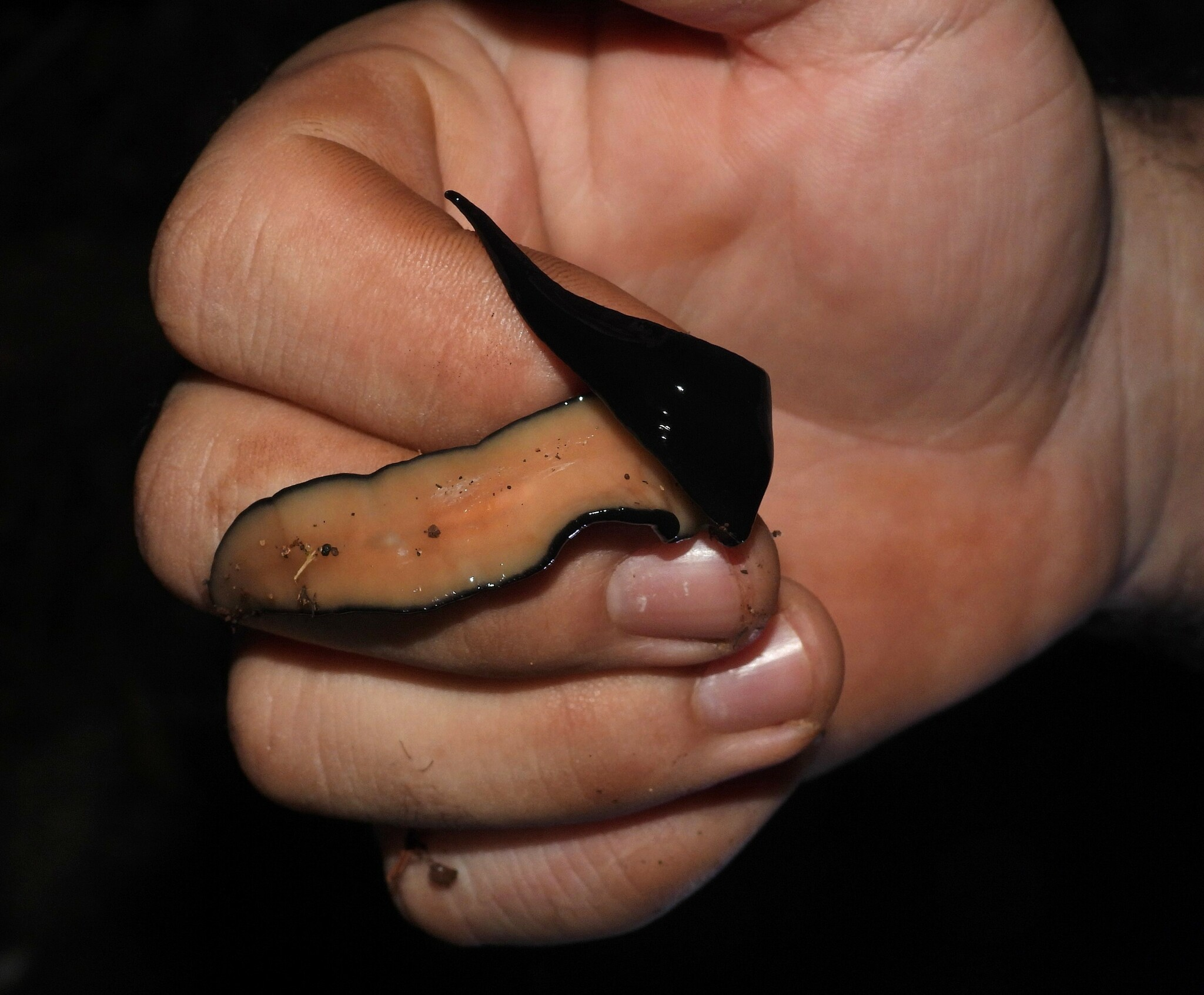
- Obama carbayoi

Scientific classification
- Kingdom: Animalia
- Phylum: Platyhelminthes
- Order: Tricladida
- Family: Geoplanidae
- Genus: Obama
- Species: O. carbayoi

Binomial name
- Obama carbayoi (Oliveira & Leal-Zanchet, 2012)

Synonyms
- Geoplana ladislavii Oliveira & Leal-Zanchet, 2012

= Obama carbayoi =

Species of flatworm

Obama carbayoi is a species of Brazilian land planarian in the subfamily Geoplaninae.

== Description ==
Obama carbayoi has a broad, flat and foliaceous body. It can reach up to 141 mm in length. The dorsal color is homogeneously black, slightly paler at the anterior end. Under a stereo microscope, the background color is seen as light brown covered by dense black pigmentation. The ventral side is orange with a dark margin. The eyes surround the anterior end in a single row, and after about 2 mm from the tip the rows increase to two or three. At about 1.5 cm from the anterior end, the eyes spread onto the dorsum, forming a band of about 2.5 mm on each side and, after 5.5 cm from the anterior end, they start to become sparser.

The copulatory apparatus includes a permanent penis papilla that occupies most of the male atrium.

== Distribution ==
Currently, the species is only known from its type locality, the Parque Estadual do Turvo in the municipality of Derrubadas, state of Rio Grande do Sul, Brazil.

== Etymology ==
The specific epithet carbayoi honors zoologist Fernando Carbayo, for his collaboration in the collection and description of several land planarians.
