= Obama apiguara =

Scientific classification
- Kingdom: Animalia
- Phylum: Platyhelminthes
- Order: Tricladida
- Family: Geoplanidae
- Genus: Obama
- Species: O. apiguara

Binomial name
- Obama apiguara Oliveira, Almeida & Carbayo, 2020

Species of flatworm

Obama apiguara is a species of land planarian belonging to the subfamily Geoplaninae. It is found within Brazil.

== Description ==
Obama apiguara is around 56 mm in length and 8 mm in width. The body is broad and flattened, with nearly parallel margins; the anterior end is pointed, and the posterior end is obtuse. The dorsum is a dark ivory color, with several black spots that form multiple striae. Both extremities of the body are black. The ventral side is a pastel yellow color, turning whitish in the area of the pharynx and copulatory apparatus. Both extremities of the ventral side are brown.

There is a glandular fossae opening through the epidermis. The penis papilla is provided with a small, intra-papillar, finger-like papilla. The species lacks a common glandular ovovitelline duct.

== Etymology ==
The specific epithet, apiguara or apyguara, is a Tupi language word meaning "nasal fossae"; this is in reference to the glandular fossae in the epidermis.

== Distribution ==
Obama apiguara is only known from the type locality, in São Joaquim National Park within the municipality of Três Barras, Brazil.
