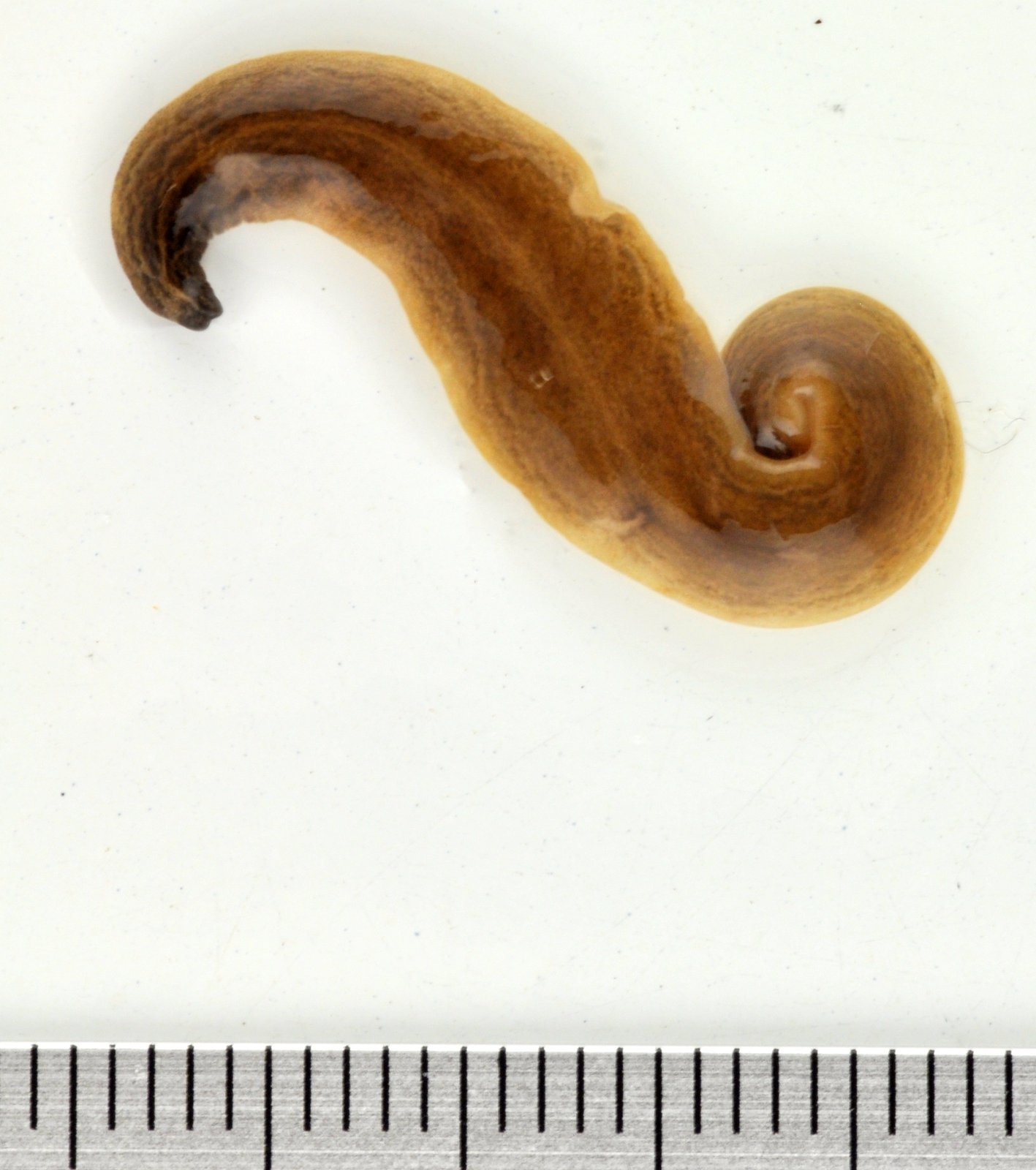
- Obama nungara

Scientific classification
- Kingdom: Animalia
- Phylum: Platyhelminthes
- Order: Tricladida
- Family: Geoplanidae
- Subfamily: Geoplaninae
- Genus: Obama; Carbayo et al., 2013

Type species
- Obama fryi (Graff, 1899)

= Obama (flatworm) =

Genus of worms

Obama /ˈoʊbəmə/ is a genus of land planarians from South America. It contains several species adapted to human-disturbed environments, including the only invasive land planarian native to the Neotropical realm, Obama nungara, which has been accidentally introduced in Europe.

== Description ==
The genus Obama is characterized by having a leaf-shaped body. Most species are about 10 centimetres (3.9 in) long, but some may reach over 20 centimetres (7.9 in). The hundreds of eyes distributed along the body are of two types: monolobulated, which are simple and circular, and trilobulated, which have three lobes.

The copulatory apparatus of Obama has a protrusible penis occupying the entire male atrium or most of it. Morphologically the genus can be divided in two subgroups depending on the shape of the penis papilla, which may be symmetrical or asymmetrical. The group with an asymmetrical penis papilla includes 10 species (O. anthropophilla, O. carbayoi, O. carrierei, O. decidualis, O. josefi, O. ladislavii, O. marmorata, O. nungara, O. otavioi and O. ruiva) and seems to form a monophyletic clade within Obama. On the other hand, the group with a symmetrical penis papilla is paraphyletic, indicating that this is the ancestral state within the genus.

== Etymology ==
The name Obama is formed by a composition of the Tupi words oba (leaf) and ma (animal), being a reference to the body shape of species in this genus. Unlike Baracktrema obamai, Tosanoides obama, and Etheostoma obama, it is not named after former US President Barack Obama and the similarity between the names is purely coincidental.

== Species ==
There are 45 species assigned to the genus Obama, making it the largest genus in the subfamily Geoplaninae:

- Obama allandra Marques, Rossi, Valiati & Leal-Zanchet, 2018
- Obama anthropophila Amaral, Leal-Zanchet & Carbayo, 2015
- Obama apeva (Froehlich, 1959)
- Obama apiguara Oliveira, Almeida & Carbayo, 2020
- Obama applanata (Graff, 1899)
- Obama argus (Graff, 1899)
- Obama assu (Froehlich, 1959)
- Obama aureolineata Iturralde & Leal-Zanchet, 2021
- Obama autumna Iturralde & Leal-Zanchet, 2021
- Obama baptistae (Leal-Zanchet & Oliveira, 2012)
- Obama braunsi (Graff, 1899)
- Obama burmeisteri (Schultze & Müller, 1857)
- Obama carbayoi (Oliveira & Leal-Zanchet, 2012)
- Obama carinata (Riester, 1938)
- Obama carrierei (Graff, 1897)
- Obama catharina (Hyman, 1957)
- Obama decidualis Amaral & Leal-Zanchet, 2015
- Obama dictyonota (Riester, 1938)
- Obama divae (Marcus, 1951)
- Obama eudoxiae (Ogren & Kawakatsu, 1990)
- Obama eudoximariae (Ogren & Kawakatsu, 1990)
- Obama evelinae (Marcus, 1951)
- Obama ferussaci (Graff, 1897)
- Obama ficki (Amaral & Leal-Zanchet, 2012)
- Obama fryi (Graff, 1899)
- Obama glieschi (Froehlich, 1959)
- Obama itatiayana (Schirch, 1929)
- Obama josefi (Carbayo & Leal-Zanchet, 2001)
- Obama ladislavii (Graff, 1899)
- Obama leticiae Iturralde & Leal-Zanchet, 2021
- Obama livia (E. M. Froehlich, 1955)
- Obama maculatentis Negrete, Gira & Brusa, 2019
- Obama maculipunctata Rossi, Amaral, Ribeiro, Cauduro, Fick, Valiati & Leal-Zanchet, 2015
- Obama marmorata (Schultze & Müller, 1857)
- Obama metzi (Graff, 1899)
- Obama nungara Carbayo, Álvarez-Presas, Jones & Riutort, 2016
- Obama otavioi Carbayo, 2016
- Obama poca (Froehlich, 1958)
- Obama polyophthalma (Graff, 1899)
- Obama riesteri (Froehlich, 1955)
- Obama rufiventris (Schultze & Müller, 1857)
- Obama ruiva (E. M. Froehlich, 1972)
- Obama schubarti (Froehlich, 1958)
- Obama tribalis Marques, Rossi, Valiati & Leal-Zanchet, 2018
- Obama trigueira (E. M. Froehlich, 1955)

== Phylogeny ==
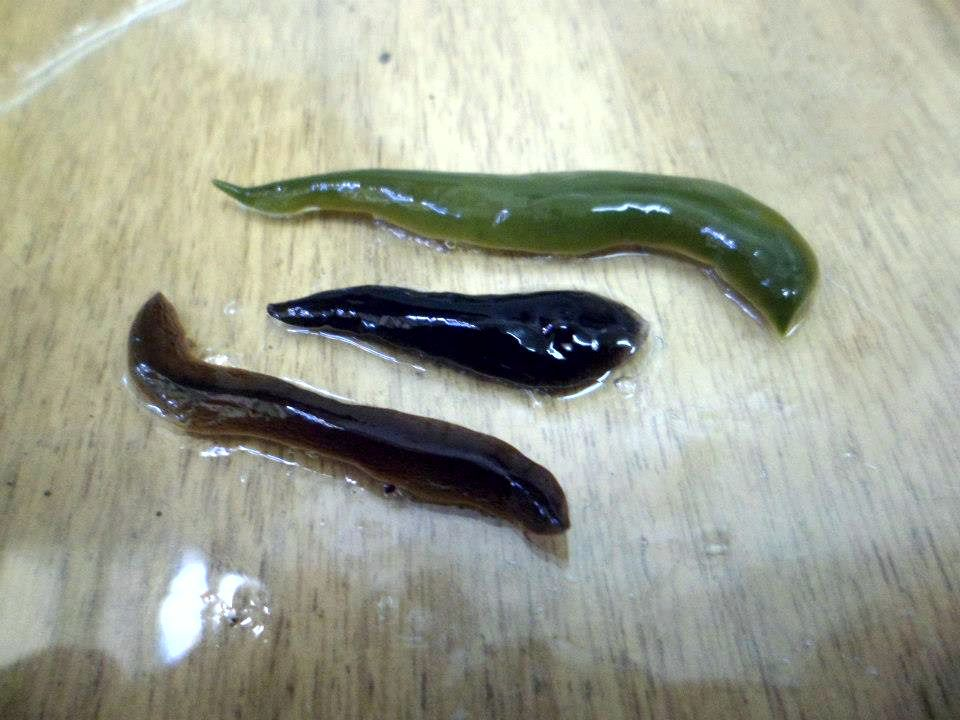
Three specimens of Obama of different species in a Petri dish. From top to bottom: O. ladislavii, O. anthropophila and O. nungara

The genus Obama was erected after a study of molecular phylogeny with the subfamily Geoplaninae revealed that the genus Geoplana, originally containing more than a hundred species, was polyphyletic. One of the monophyletic clades revealed by the study was separate from Geoplana as the new genus Obama. All species within the new genus share a similar morphology, including the leaf-shaped body, the presence of a permanent penis papilla, ovovitelline ducts entering the female atrium dorsally and dorsal eyes of two types: mono- and trilobulated.

The sister-group of Obama seems to be the genus Cratera, which has a very similar appearance but lacks trilobulated eyes.

The following phylogenetic tree shows the relationship of several species of Obama after several molecular studies:

- - - Obama baptistae
    - - Obama braunsi
      - - Obama apeva
        - Obama ficki
  - - Obama fryi
    - - - Obama eudoximariae
        - - Obama carinata
          - Obama itatiayana
          - - Obama burmeisteri
            - Obama maculipunctata
            - - Obama applanata
              - Obama argus sensu Graff, 1899
      - - Obama argus sensu Schirch, 1929
        - - Obama ladislavii
          - - Obama nungara
            - Obama otavioi
            - - Obama josefi
              - - Obama marmorata
                - - Obama anthropophila
                  - Obama decidualis
