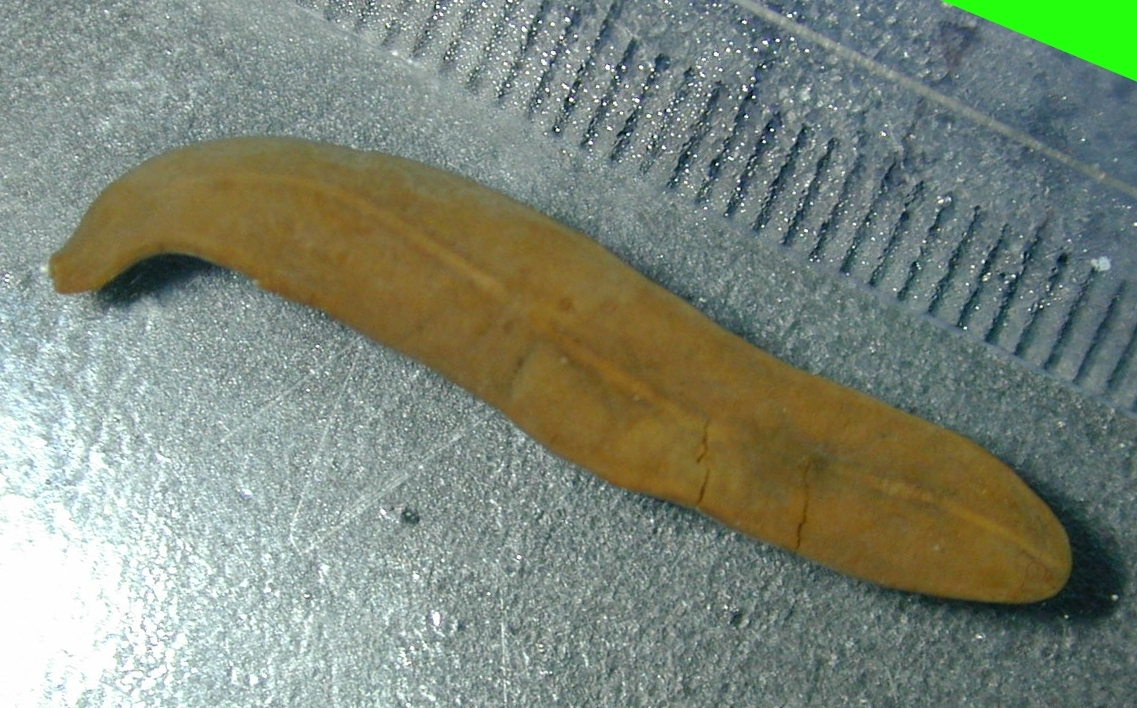

Scientific classification
- Kingdom: Animalia
- Phylum: Platyhelminthes
- Order: Tricladida
- Family: Geoplanidae
- Subfamily: Geoplaninae
- Genus: Amaga; Ogren & Kawakatsu, 1990
- Species: A. bogotensis

Binomial name
- Amaga bogotensis (von Graff, 1899)

Synonyms
- Geoplana bogotensis von Graff, 1899; Pseudogeoplana bogotensis Ogren & Kawakatsu, 1992; Bogga bogotensis Grau & Sluys, 2012

= Amaga bogotensis =

Species of flatworm

Amaga bogotensis is a species of land planarians that occurs in Colombia in the capital Bogotá and surrounding areas.

== Description ==
Amaga bogotensis has a large and broad, flat body. The dorsal side is grey-black, with two dark yellow stripes, one encircling the body and one mid-dorsal stripe, both around the same width. The copulatory apparatus lacks a permanent penis, but the male atrium is lined by multiple musculo-glandular papillae. The ovovitelline ducts enter the female atrium at the same time, without joining to form a common duct.

== Etymology ==
The name bogotensis refers to the city of Bogotá, Colombia, where the species was first found.
