= Obama tribalis =

Scientific classification
- Kingdom: Animalia
- Phylum: Platyhelminthes
- Order: Tricladida
- Family: Geoplanidae
- Genus: Obama
- Species: O. tribalis

Binomial name
- Obama tribalis Marques, Rossi, Valiati & Leal-Zanchet, 2018

Species of flatworm

Obama tribalis is a species of land planarian belonging to the subfamily Geoplaninae. It is found within Brazil.

== Description ==
Obama tribalis has a foliaceous, or leaf-shaped, body that can reach up to 33 mm in length when crawling. Both ends of the body are rounded, and the dorsum is slightly convex. The dorsum is a yellowish color. The cephalic region has grey pigmentation and is contoured by blackish pigment, which also forms irregular flecks all across the dorsum. These flecks are more concentrated laterally, and are able to form a pattern resembling crossed stripes. The median region of the dorsum is almost completely lacking flecks. The ventral side of the body is grey with yellowish margins.

The pharynx is cylindrical. The prostatic vesicle has two portions, proximal and distal; the proximal portion is forked and globose in shape, while the distal portion is shaped like a funnel or a pear. The penis papilla is symmetrical, conical, and long. The male and female atria have slightly folded walls.

== Etymology ==
The specific epithet is derived from the Latin tribalis, meaning "tribal", in reference to the crossed-stripe appearance of the dorsum resembling tribal-style drawings in appearance.

== Distribution ==
Obama tribalis is only known from the type locality, within the municipality of Gravataí, Brazil.
