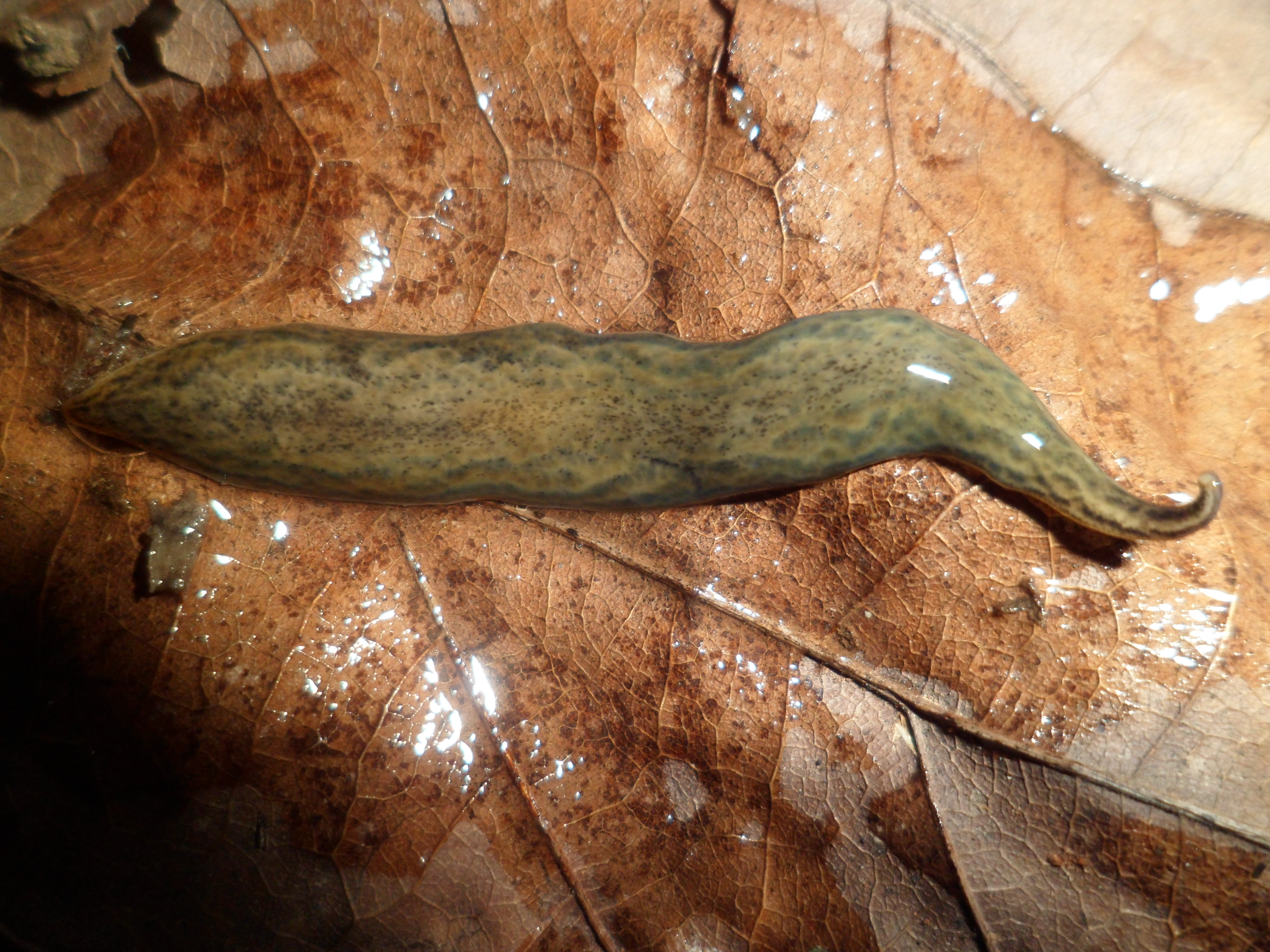

Scientific classification
- Kingdom: Animalia
- Phylum: Platyhelminthes
- Order: Tricladida
- Family: Geoplanidae
- Genus: Obama
- Species: O. maculipunctata

Binomial name
- Obama maculipunctata Rossi, Amaral, Ribeiro, Cauduro, Fick, Valiati & Leal-Zanchet, 2015

= Obama maculipunctata =

Species of flatworm

Obama maculipunctata is a species of Brazilian land planarian in the subfamily Geoplaninae.

== Description ==
Obama maculipunctata is a medium-sized land planarian with a lanceolate body. The largest specimens reach more than 70 mm in length. The color of the dorsum is composed by a light-brown background covered with numerous fine black spots, as well as irregular grey flecks more concentrated at the sides, giving it a marbled aspect. The ventral side pale-yellow in the anterior third and orange in the middle and posterior thirds.

The several eyes of O. maculipunctata are distributed marginally in the first millimeters of the body and posteriorly become dorsal, occupying around 20% of the body width at the median third of the body.

== Etymology ==
The specific epithet maculipunctata (Latin for spotted and punctate) refers to the numerous flecks and dots covering the animal's dorsum.

== Distribution ==
The habitat of O. maculipunctata includes moist forests in northeast Rio Grande do Sul and east Santa Catarina, southern Brazil, as well as plantations of Araucaria angustifolia and Pinus spp.
