= Obama maculatentis =

Scientific classification
- Kingdom: Animalia
- Phylum: Platyhelminthes
- Order: Tricladida
- Family: Geoplanidae
- Genus: Obama
- Species: O. maculatentis

Binomial name
- Obama maculatentis Negrete, Gira & Brusa, 2019

Species of flatworm

Obama maculatentis is a species of land planarian belonging to the subfamily Geoplaninae. It is found within Argentina.

== Description ==
Obama maculatentis has an elongate body with parallel margins that can reach up to 50 mm in length; the front tip of the body is rounded, while the back is pointed. The dorsum is a black-olive color that pales at the cephalic region. Along the dorsum are two irregular rows of black spots; these spots are generally not very visible to the naked eye, usually only able to be seen in flash photography or following artificial preservation of a specimen. The ventral side of the body is light grey.

== Etymology ==
The specific epithet is derived from the Latin words macula and latentis, literally meaning "hidden spots"; this is in reference to the species' dorsal spots that are not usually visible at first glance.

== Distribution ==
Obama maculatentis is only known from the type locality, in the Punta Lara natural reserve in Buenos Aires Province, Argentina.
