= Obama allandra =

Scientific classification
- Kingdom: Animalia
- Phylum: Platyhelminthes
- Order: Tricladida
- Family: Geoplanidae
- Genus: Obama
- Species: O. allandra

Binomial name
- Obama allandra Marques, Rossi, Valiati & Leal-Zanchet, 2018

Species of flatworm

Obama allandra is a species of land planarian belonging to the subfamily Geoplaninae. It is found within Brazil.

== Description ==
Obama allandra has an elongate body with parallel margins, a rounded anterior tip, and a pointed posterior tip. It can reach a maximum of 39 mm in length. The dorsum is a brownish base color. Irregular dark brown or blackish flecks occur all across the dorsum, forming paramedian stripes on the body's front half and an overlaying band on the back half. A yellowish median band runs down the dorsum, which is greyish in the cephalic region. The ventral side of the body is light brown, fading into a more greyish tone at the interior tip.

The pharynx is cylindrical, and the dorsal pharyngeal insertion is slightly posteriorly shifted. The prostatic vesicle has two portions, proximal and distal; the proximal portion is forked, and can range from globose to ovoid in shape, while the distal portion is wide and shaped like an inverted U. The penis papilla can either be symmetrical and conical, or asymmetrical and irregularly shaped. The male atrium has a dorso-lateral invagination. A dorsal fold separates the male and female atria.

== Etymology ==
The specific epithet is derived from the Greek words άλλος (állos), "different", and ἀνδρός (andrós), "man". This is in reference to the species' male atrium, which showed a variable aspect in the studied type specimens.

== Distribution ==
Obama allandra is only known from the type locality, within the municipality of General Carneiro, Brazil.
