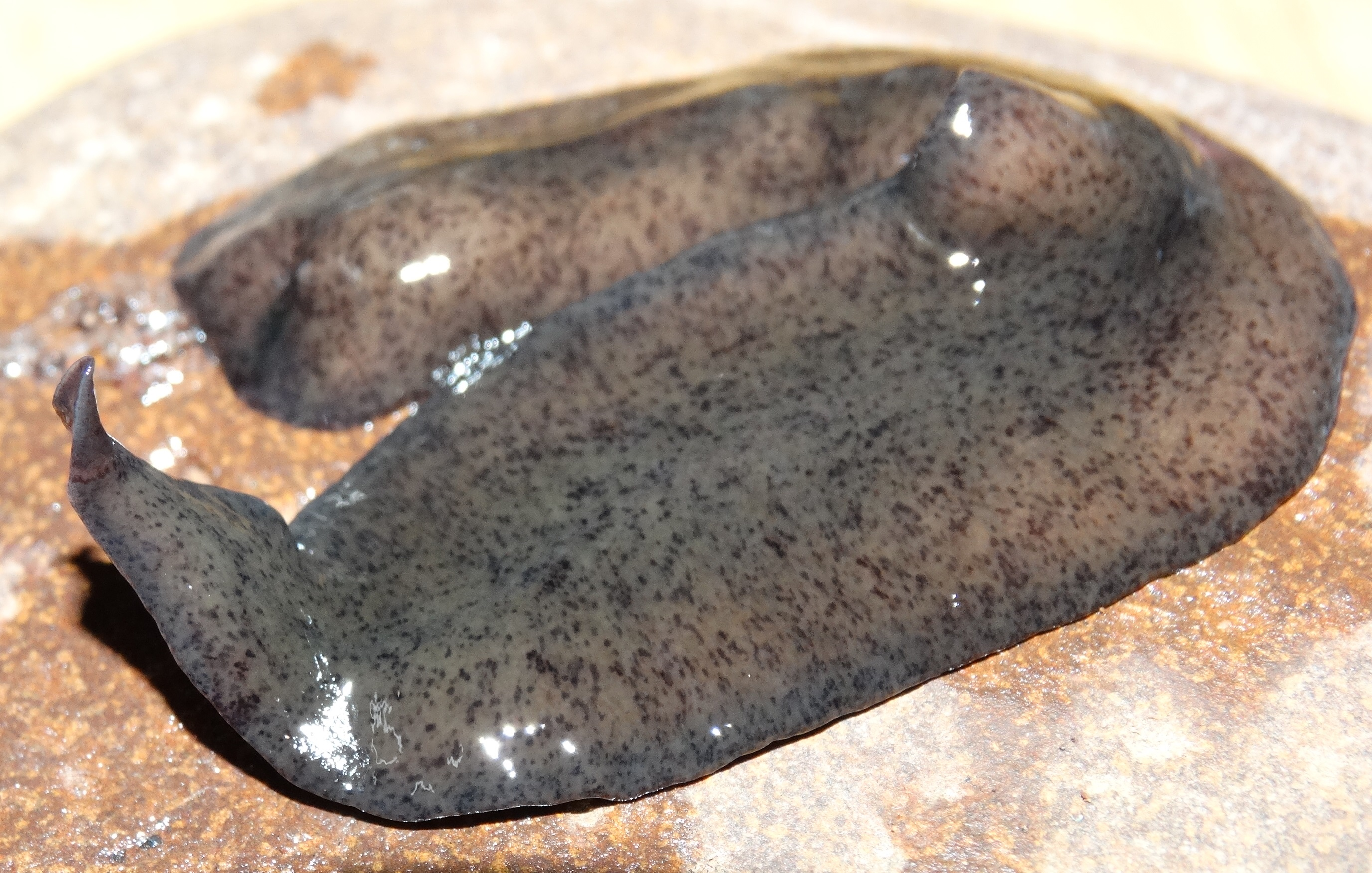

Scientific classification
- Kingdom: Animalia
- Phylum: Platyhelminthes
- Order: Tricladida
- Family: Geoplanidae
- Genus: Obama
- Species: O. ficki

Binomial name
- Obama ficki (Amaral & Leal-Zanchet, 2012)

Synonyms
- Geoplana ficki Amaral & Leal-Zanchet, 2012

= Obama ficki =

Species of flatworm

Obama ficki is a large species of Brazilian land planarian in the subfamily Geoplaninae.

== Description ==
Obama ficki is a large land planarian with a broad and flat leaf-like body. The largest specimens reach more than 20 cm in length. The color of the dorsum is composed by a greyish-brown background covered with numerous fine black spots. The ventral side is orange.

The several eyes of O. ficki are distributed marginally in the first centimeters of the body and posteriorly become dorsal, occupying around 30% of the body width at the median third of the body.

The pharynx is collar-form. The esophagus is very short. The prostatic vesicle is tubular and shape and consists of two portions; the proximal portion is short and forked, while the distal portion is unpaired and loops into the bulbar muscular coat. The male atrium is short, and the penis papilla is conical, extending into the female atrium. The common glandular ovovitelline duct is short. The female atrium is elongate with an ample lumen, and is longer than the male atrium; no folds that would separate the atria are present.

== Etymology ==
The specific epithet was given in honor of Israel Alberto Fick, for "his collaboration in collecting various specimens of land planarians", which were deposited at the Instituto de Pesquisas de Planárias (Flatworm Research Institute) of Unisinos.

== Distribution ==
The habitat of O. ficki includes seasonal and moist forests in northeast Rio Grande do Sul and east Santa Catarina, southern Brazil.

== Ecology and behavior ==
Obama ficki has been observed to feed on terrestrial gastropods; it has been observed to consume certain invasive species, such as Bradybaena similaris and Deroceras laeve.

When tracking down prey, O. ficki follows the trails of substrate left by gastropods. Due to its large size, O. ficki, when catching up to prey, is able to easily cover the gastropod with its body to immobilize it. When this is done, O. ficki can evert its pharynx and attach it to the prey, crushing it into smaller pieces before sucking it into the intestine.
