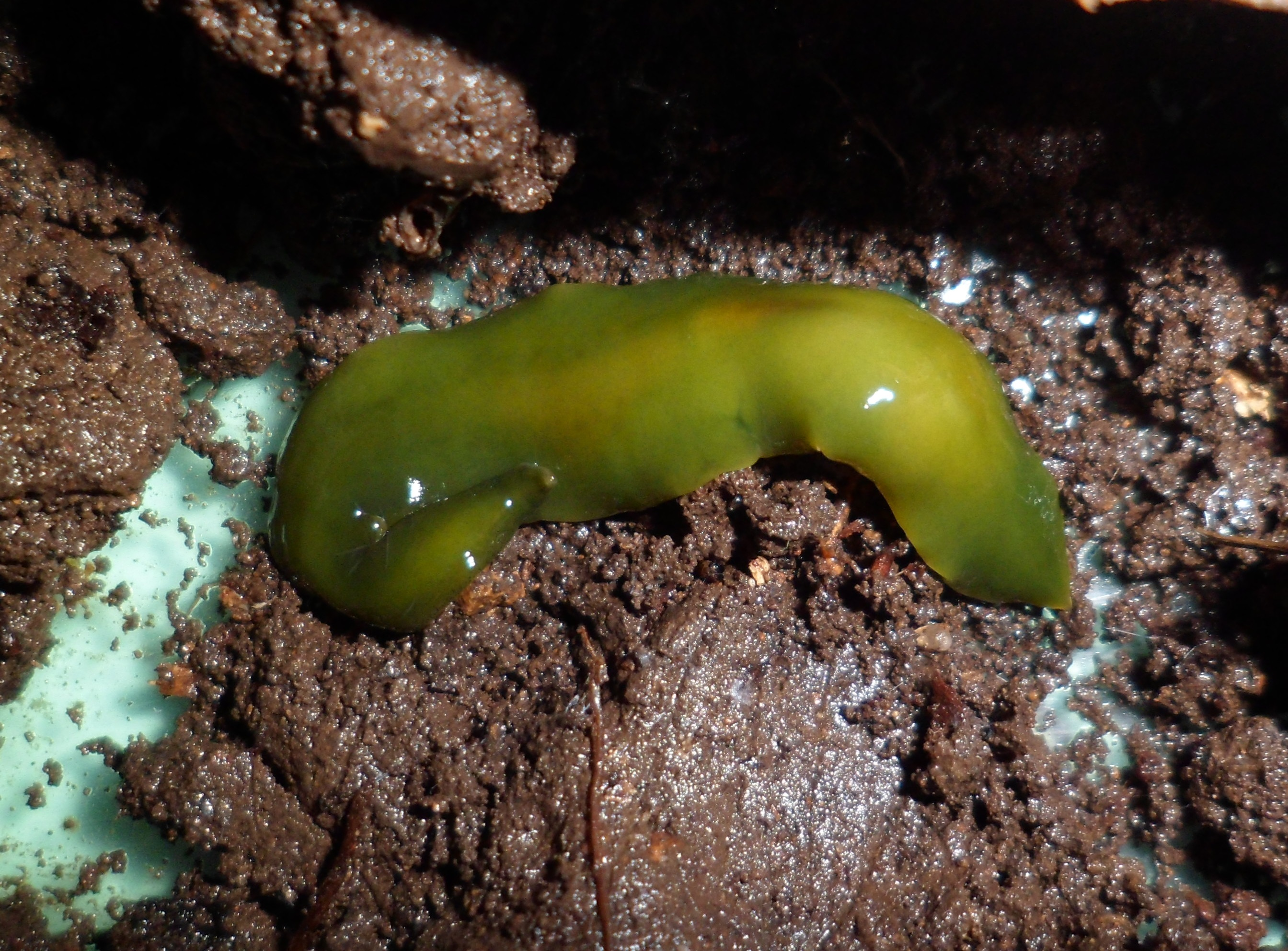

Scientific classification
- Kingdom: Animalia
- Phylum: Platyhelminthes
- Order: Tricladida
- Family: Geoplanidae
- Genus: Obama
- Species: O. ladislavii

Binomial name
- Obama ladislavii (von Graff, 1899)

Synonyms
- Geoplana ladislavii von Graff, 1899

= Obama ladislavii =

Species of flatworm

Obama ladislavii is a species of Brazilian land planarian in the subfamily Geoplaninae. It is one of the most common land planarians in human-disturbed environments in southern Brazil and is easily identifiable by the green color of its dorsum.

== Description ==
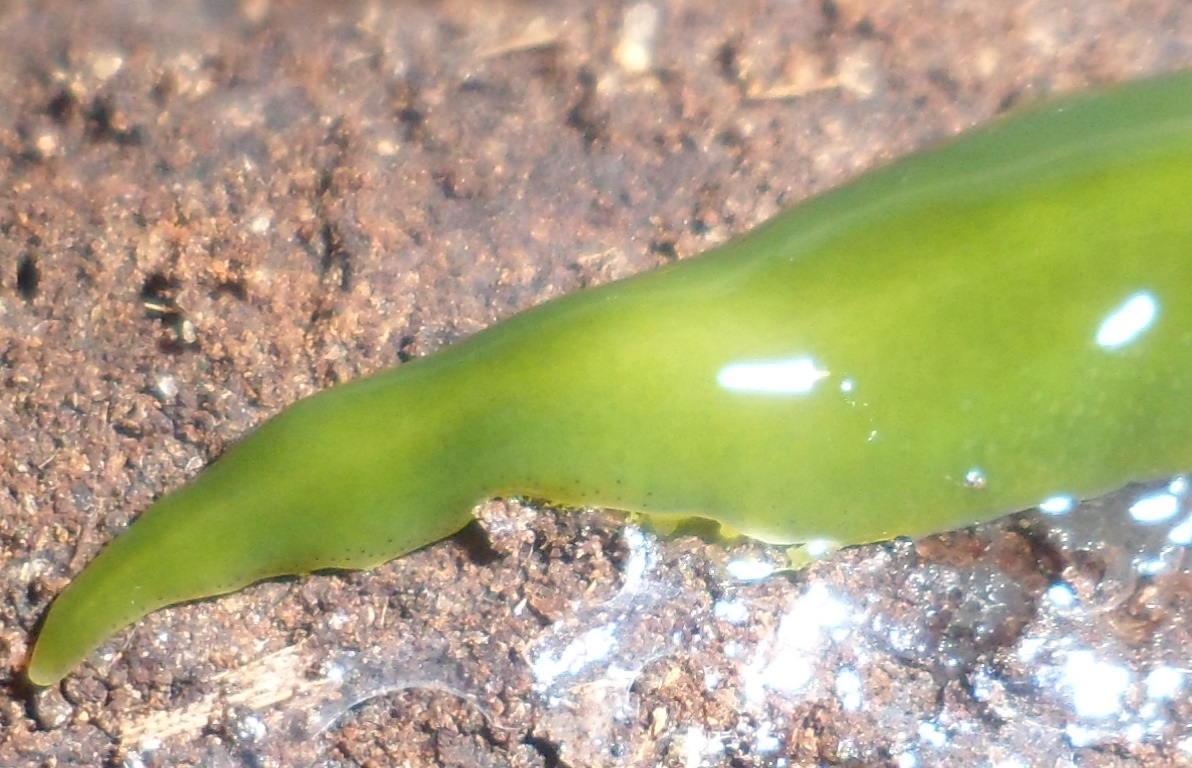
Detail of Obama ladislavii showing the lateral eyes as black dots (close to the anterior end) and the dorsal eyes as white dots (more posteriorly). Click to enlarge.

Obama ladislavii is a medium-sized land planarian with a lanceolate body. The larger specimens have a length of about 100 millimeters or more. The dorsum is green, varying from luminous green to brownish green without stripes. The ventral side is yellowish.

The numerous eyes, about 800, are distributed marginally on the first millimeters of the body, being visible as a group of very small black dots, and posteriorly become dorsal, occupying up to 30% of the body width on each side. The dorsal eyes themselves are not easily visible to the naked eye, but are surrounded by a zone without pigmentation, called halo, which may be perceived as small whitish dots.

On fully mature specimens, two irregular rows of spots with a darker green tinge may be seen on the first half of the body. Those rows are the many dorsal testicles visible through the body.

== Distribution ==
Obama ladislavii is known to occur in the two southernmost Brazilian states, Santa Catarina and Rio Grande do Sul. It is found in both native and disturbed environments, including seasonal and moist forests, as well as in human-disturbed areas, such as gardens, parks and plantations. Among the forest formations in which it was recorded are Araucaria moist forest, Atlantic rainforest, and deciduous and semideciduous seasonal forests.

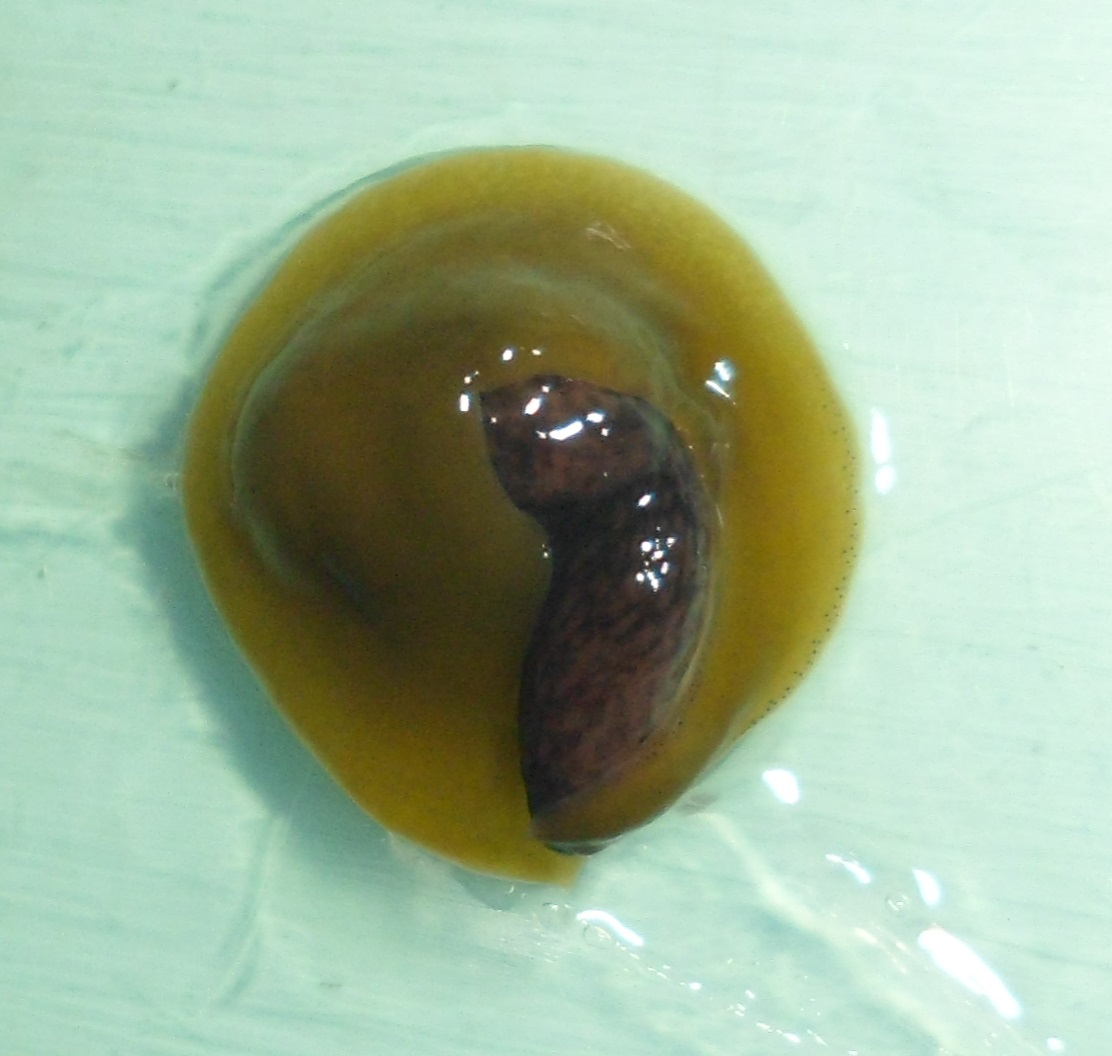
Obama ladislavii capturing a slug Deroceras laeve.

== Diet ==
As most land planarians, O. ladislavii is a predator. In laboratory experiments, it has been shown to feed on land gastropods, including species of environmental and economic concern, such as Bradybaena similaris, Cornu aspersum and Deroceras laeve. It is able to detect a slime trail left by the gastropod on the substrate and follow it.

Once finding the prey, the planarian can try to immobilize it by muscular force and, if it succeeds, it everts its pharynx and begins to consume the gastropod. In some cases, however, the planarian may not need to immobilize the prey; it can climb onto the shell, so that if the gastropod attempts escape, the planarian would be pulled along. When this occurs, the planarian can place its pharynx near the shell without the need for immobilization. In order to ingest snails and large slugs, O. ladislavii pierces the prey's body with its pharynx and sucks its contents, apparently after releasing digestive enzymes. Small slugs may be entirely sucked by the pharynx into the intestine.
