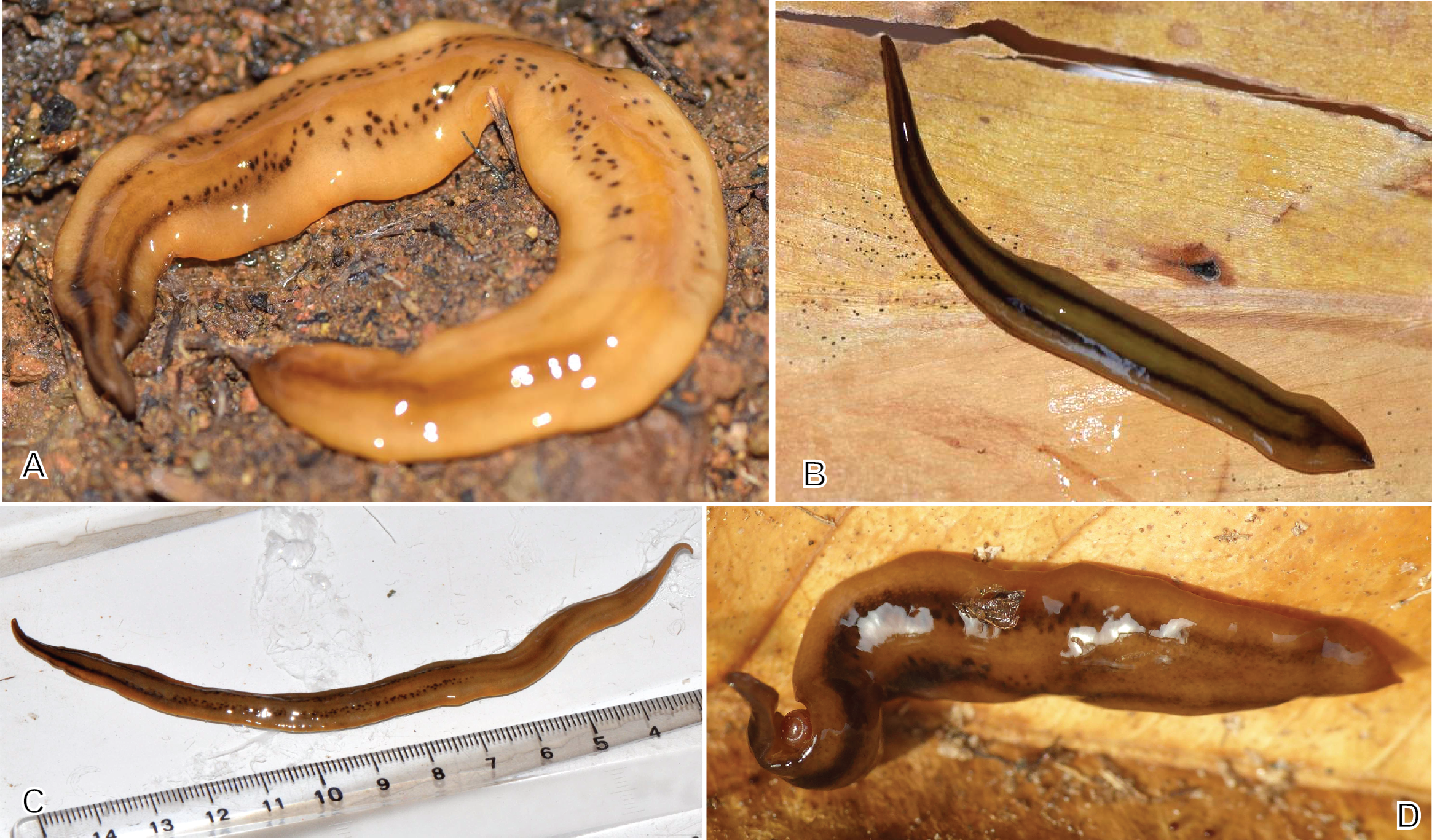
- Amaga expatria from La Martinique

Scientific classification
- Kingdom: Animalia
- Phylum: Platyhelminthes
- Order: Tricladida
- Family: Geoplanidae
- Genus: Amaga
- Species: A. expatria

Binomial name
- Amaga expatria Jones & Sterrer, 2005

= Amaga expatria =

Species of flatworm

Amaga expatria is a large species of land planarian in the subfamily Geoplaninae.

== Description ==
Amaga expatria is a large species, reaching 132 mm in length and 9 mm in width in extended state. The dorsal colour is mid-brown with a dark brown anterior tip, with two narrow dark blue lines dorsally along the anterior third. It looks a bit like, in colour and shape, "a banana cut lengthwise".

== Etymology ==
According to the authors of the taxon, the specific epithet "is based on ex patria = expatriate, meaning away from one's native country, recognising that this worm, like much of the present biota of Bermuda including humans, originated elsewhere."

== Distribution ==
Amaga expatria has been found in the Bermuda and in two islands of the Caribbean, Martinique and Guadeloupe. The species is abundant in Guadeloupe and Martinique.

== Ecology ==
As other land flatworms, this animal is a predator of other small animals. The prey of Amaga expatria include molluscs and earthworms.

== Molecular information ==
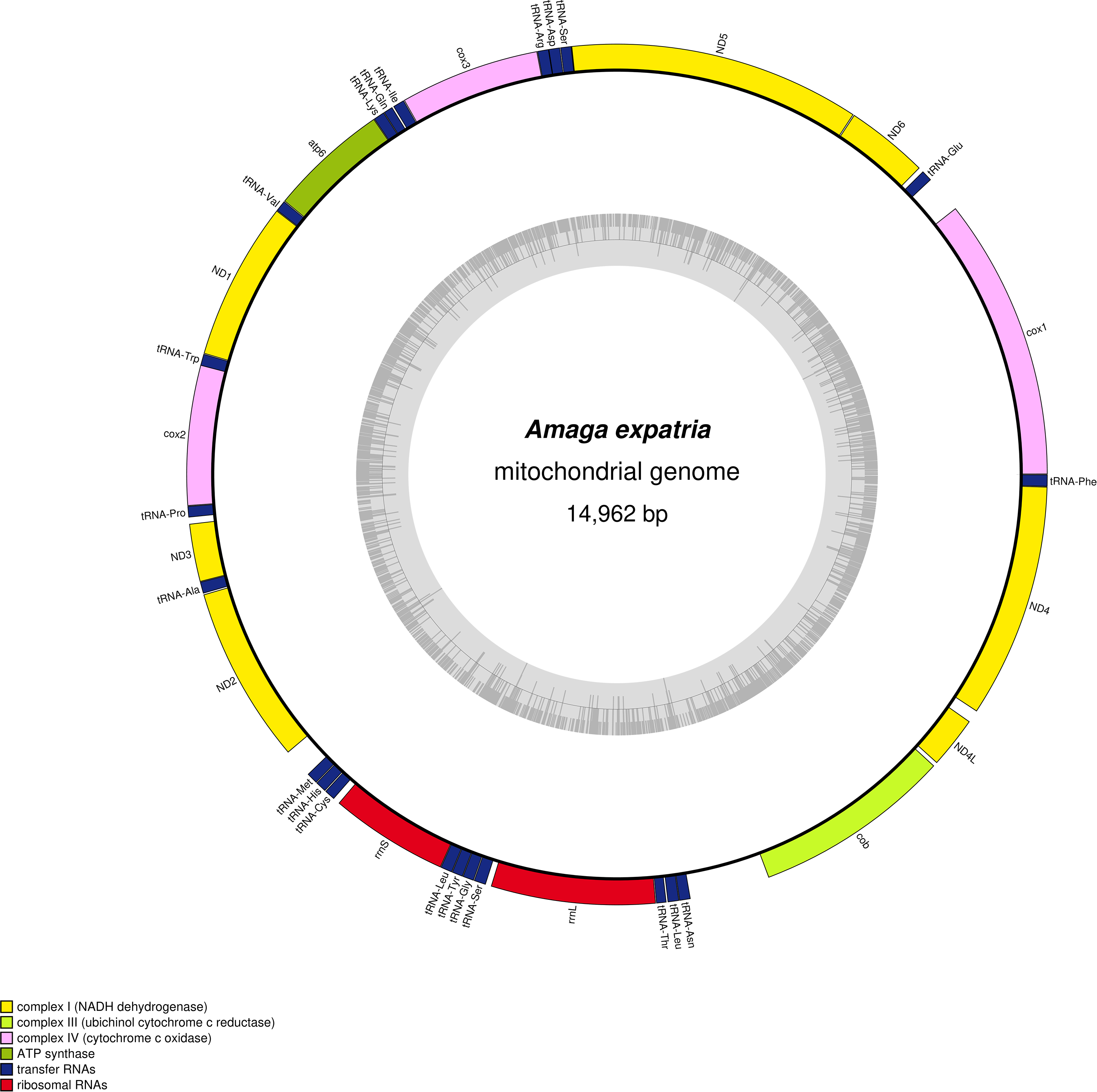
The complete mitogenome of Amaga expatria

The complete mitogenome of Amaga expatria was described in 2020. It is 14,962 bp in length and contains 12 protein coding genes, two rRNA genes and 22 tRNA genes.
