= Obama decidualis =

Scientific classification
- Kingdom: Animalia
- Phylum: Platyhelminthes
- Order: Tricladida
- Family: Geoplanidae
- Genus: Obama
- Species: O. decidualis

Binomial name
- Obama decidualis Amaral & Leal-Zanchet, 2015

Species of flatworm

Obama decidualis is a species of land planarian belonging to the subfamily Geoplaninae. It is found within Brazil.

== Description ==
Obama decidualis has a foliaceous, or leaf-shaped, and elongate body that can reach up to 60 mm in length. The anterior tip is rounded while the posterior tip is pointed, and the body margins are rounded. The dorsum is a dark brown color that lightens along the margins, and the ventral side is a light brown color.

The sensory pits are invaginations in a single row on each side of the body. The glandular margin is constituted of three gland types. The pharynx is long and cylindrical in shape. The ejaculatory duct is almost straight, and the penis papilla is irregularly shaped and projecting from the anterior male atrium.

== Etymology ==
The specific epithet, decidualis, is in reference to deciduous forests, as that is the type of forest that the type specimens of O. decidualis were found in.

== Distribution ==
Obama decidualis is known to be found in and on the borders of temperate deciduous forests within the municipality of Santa Maria in Rio Grande do Sul, Brazil.
