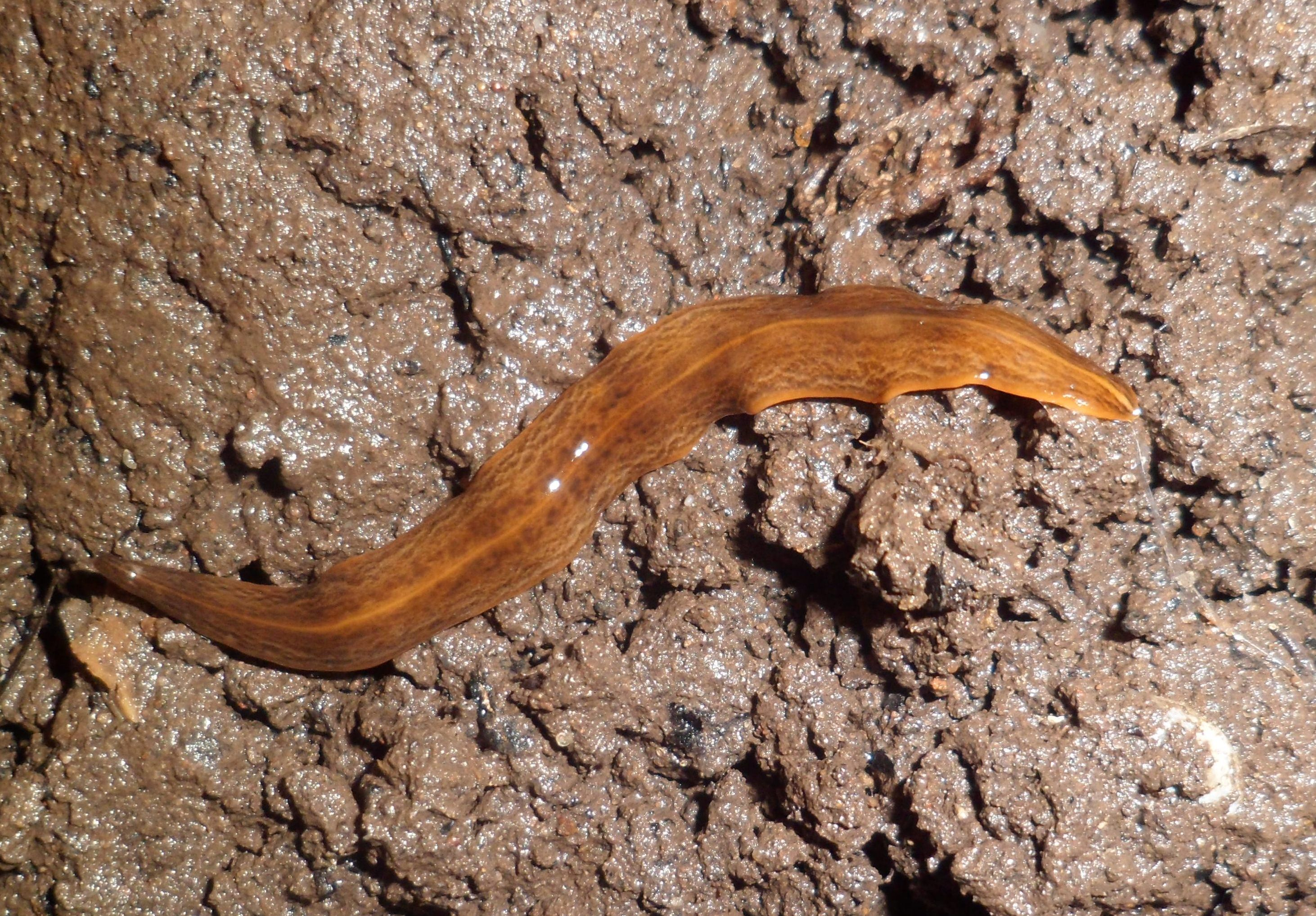

Scientific classification
- Kingdom: Animalia
- Phylum: Platyhelminthes
- Order: Tricladida
- Family: Geoplanidae
- Genus: Obama
- Species: O. nungara

Binomial name
- Obama nungara Carbayo, Álvarez-Presas, Jones & Riutort, 2016

Synonyms
- Obama marmorata (von Graff, 1899) sensu Lago-Barcia et al., 2015

= Obama nungara =

Species of flatworm

Obama nungara /ˈoʊbəmə/ is a species of land planarian in the family Geoplanidae. It is native to South America, but has been introduced in Europe.

== Description ==
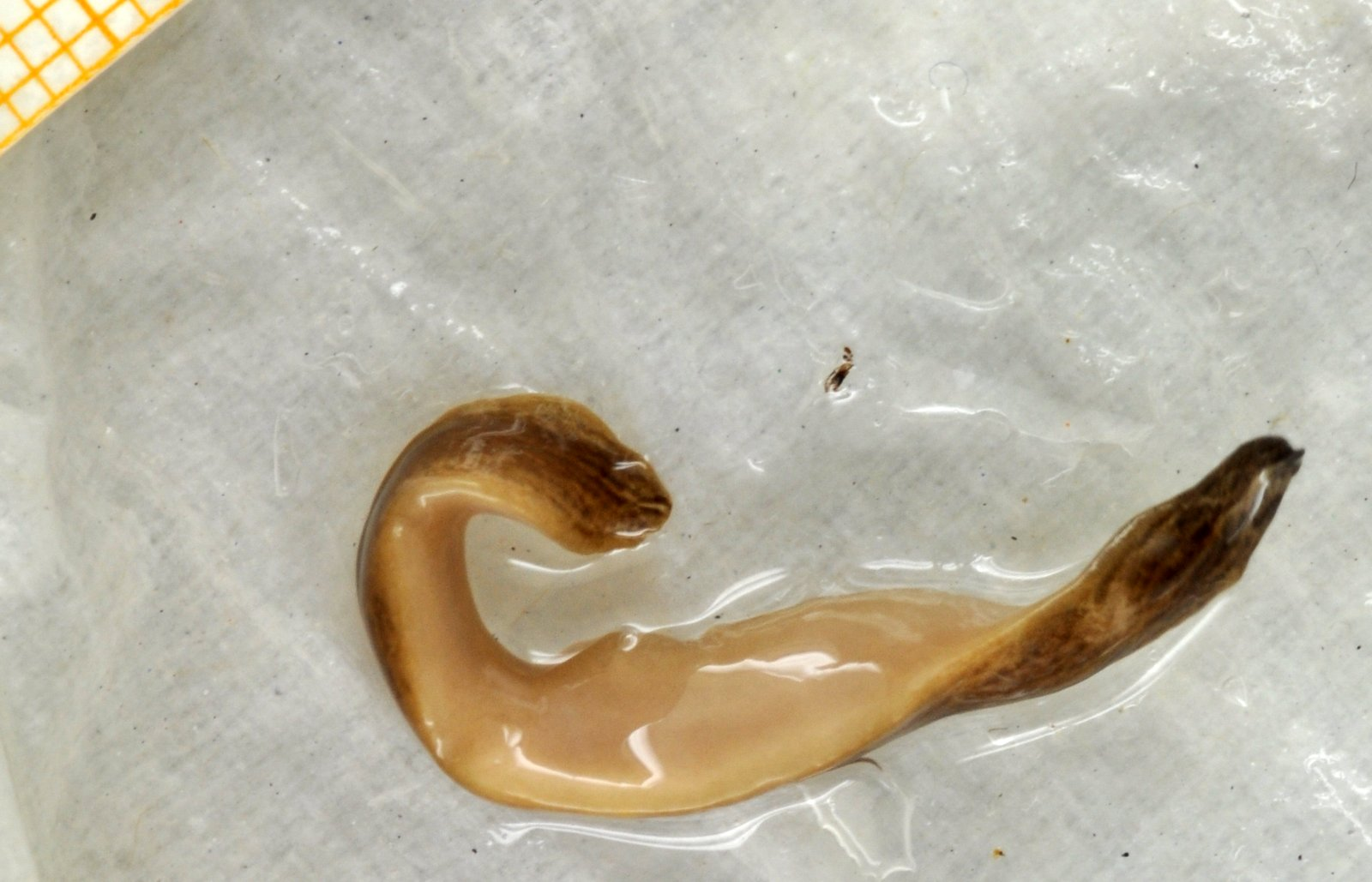
Obama nungara showing the ventral side.

Obama nungara is a medium-sized land planarian with a lanceolate body, being up to 70 millimetres (2.8 in) long. The background color of the dorsum varies from golden yellow to honey yellow and is covered by dark-brown to black spots and flecks aggregated in short and irregular longitudinal streaks, giving it a light to dark-brown marbled appearance. A fine line devoid of brown pigmentation usually runs longitudinally along the middle of the dorsum, sometimes having a diffuse dark border formed by concentration of the brown pigmentation. In some specimens this line is also covered by pigmentation and is almost unnoticeable. The ventral side has a uniform cream to grey-white color.

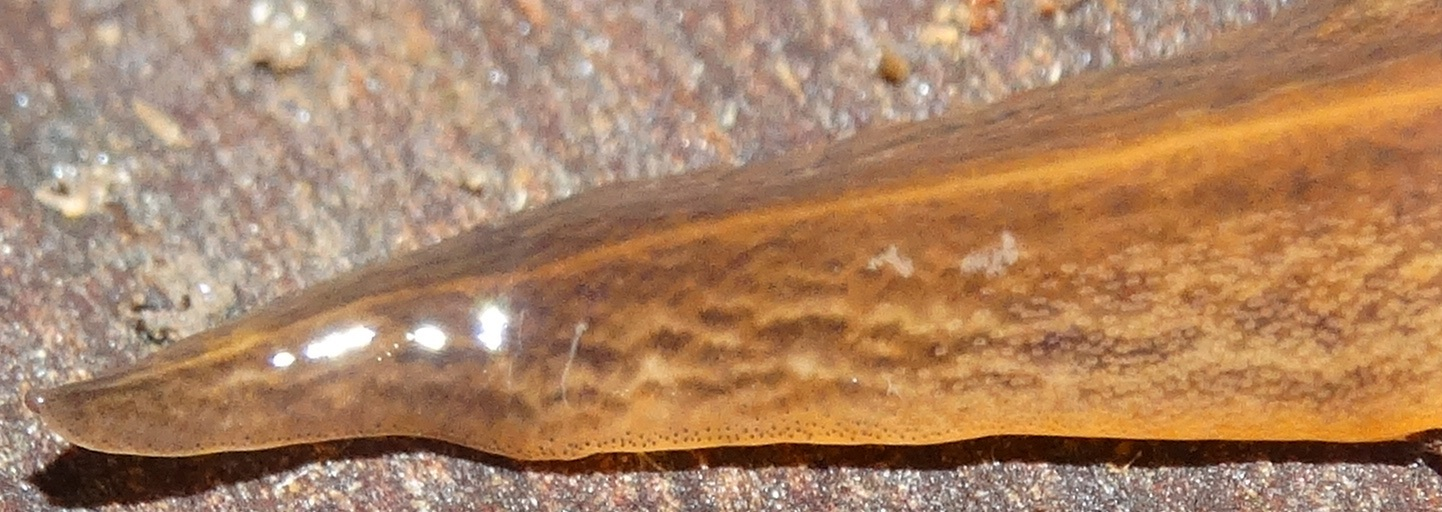
Detail of Obama nungara showing anterior end. Marginal eyes are visible as small black dots and dorsal eyes as whitish dots.

As in most species of the genus Obama, O. nungara has hundreds of eyes distributed along the body. They form a single row around the anterior tip and after the first millimeters they become pluriserial, spreading to the dorsal surface and occupying about one third of the body width on either side. The dorsal eyes are surrounded by clear halos (areas devoid of pigmentation) which may be perceived as a set of small whitish dots under close inspection or under a stereo microscope.

The general color pattern of O. nungara is very similar to that of Obama marmorata, a species with which it lives in sympatry in some areas in southern Brazil. As a result, O. nungara was initially mistakenly identified as O. marmorata.

== Etymology ==
The specific epithet nungara comes from Tupi, meaning similar, alike, and refers to the resemblance of O. nungara to O. marmorata.

== Distribution and ecology ==
Obama nungara is native from South America. Populations in the two southernmost Brazilian states, Santa Catarina and Rio Grande do Sul are most certainly native. The species is also found in Argentina, where it may be native or introduced. It is very common in human-disturbed areas, especially gardens and parks.

=== Obama nungara as an invader in Europe ===
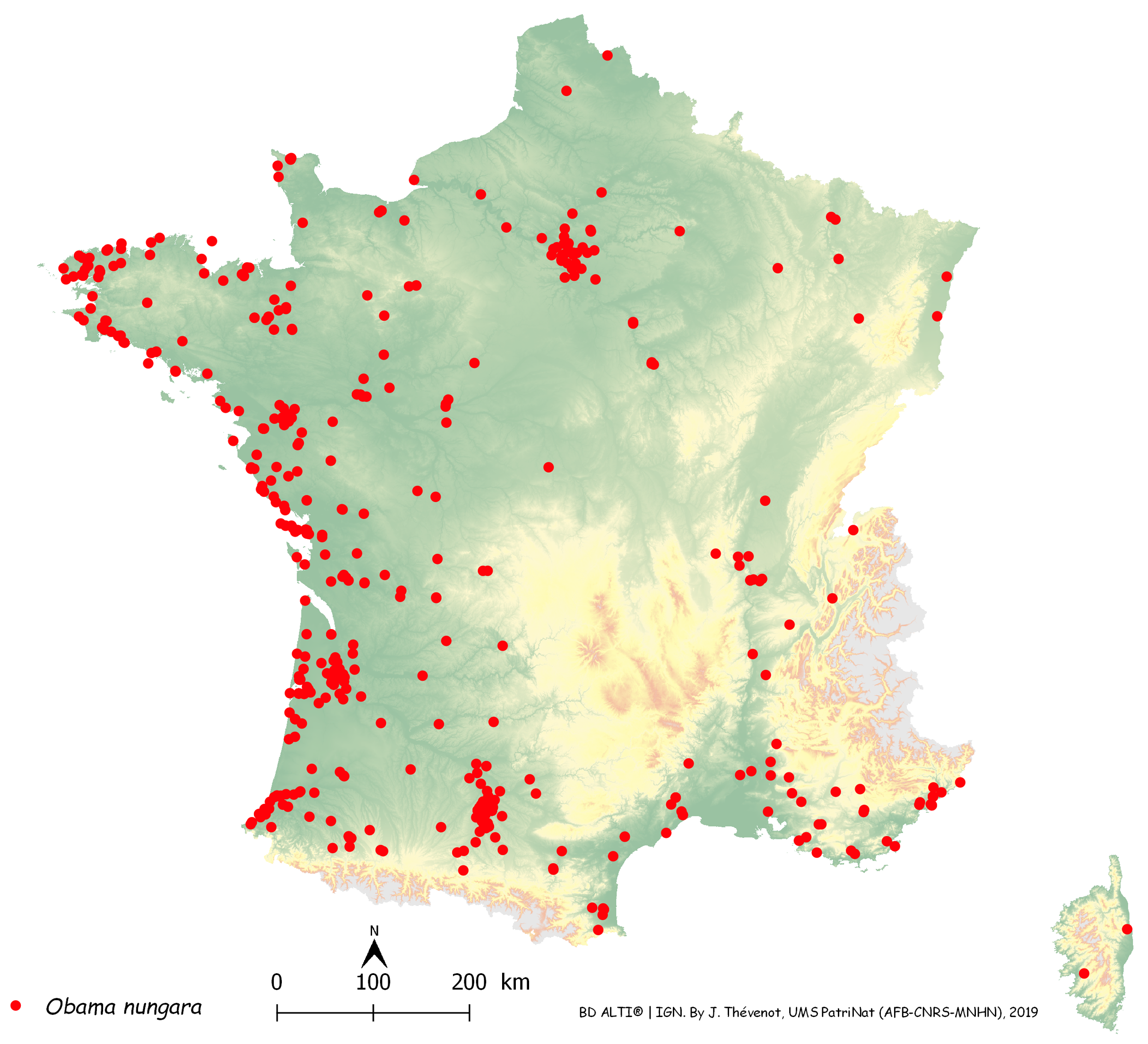
The invasion of Metropolitan France by Obama nungara - each red dot is a record

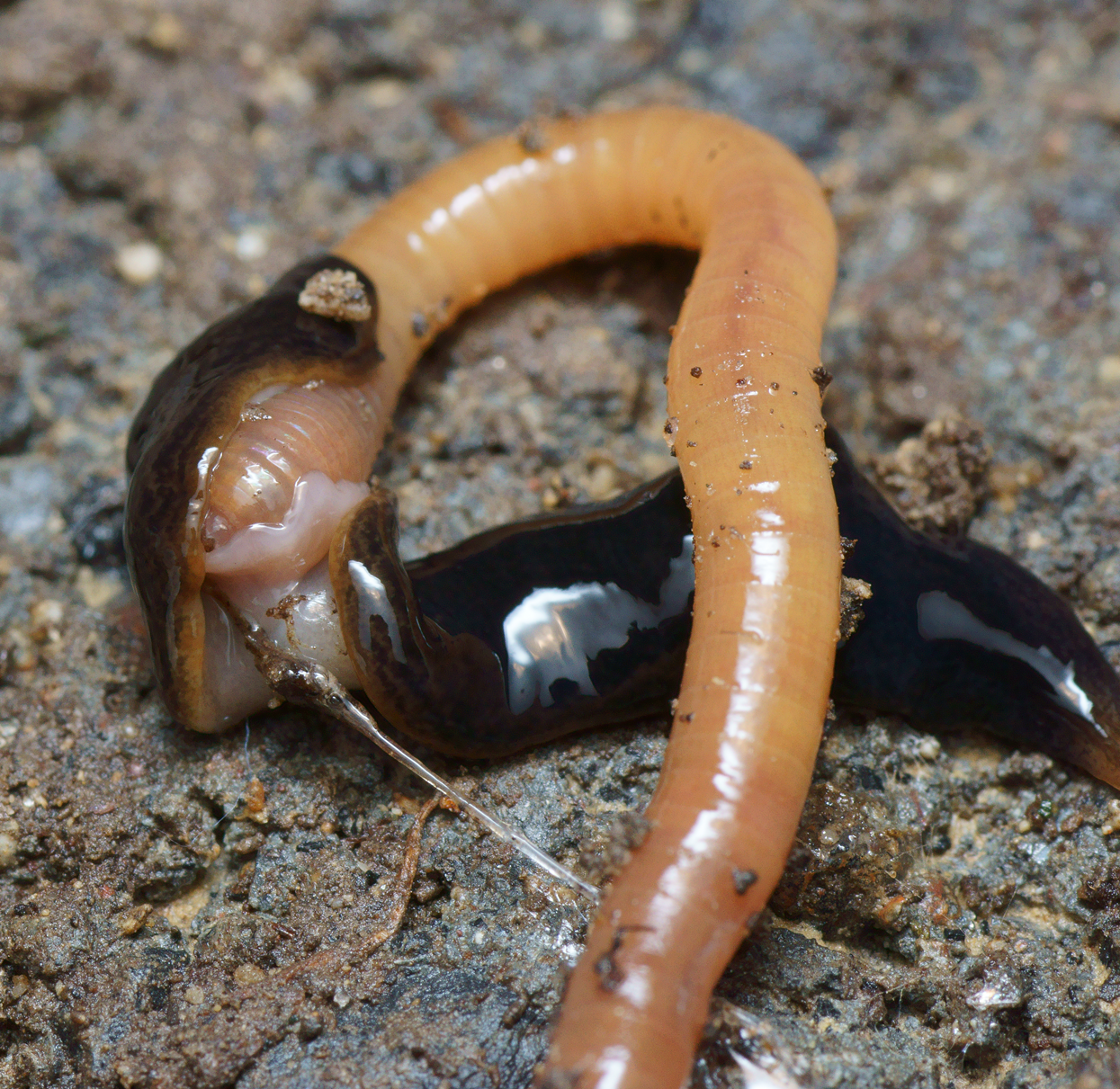
Obama nungara killing and eating an earthworm

Since 2008, a large land planarian has been found in several localities in Europe, including Guernsey, Great Britain, France, Spain, Italy and, more recently, Belgium, the Netherlands, Slovakia, Sweden and Hungary.

It was identified as possibly of Neotropical origin and belonging to the genus Obama, but its true identity was not resolved at first. In France, where it seems to be particularly common, it has been nicknamed marron plate (French for flat brown).

A study published in 2015 identified the species as Obama marmorata based on the morphological redescription of this species by Froehlich. However, a year later, a new study using morphological and molecular analyses including material of Obama marmorata from the type-locality of the species concluded that the invasive species found in Europe, which is also common in southern Brazil and northern Argentina, is a new species, and it was named Obama nungara.

In a study published in 2020, Obama nungara was recorded from Italy, Switzerland, and 72 of the 96 Departments of Metropolitan France. The species was especially abundant along the Atlantic coast, from the Spanish border to Brittany, and along the Mediterranean coast, from the Spanish border to the Italian border. More than half of the records were from an altitude below 50 m, and no record was from above 500 m; mountainous regions such as the Alps, Pyrenees and Massif Central were not invaded. However, in 2019, a specimen was found on São Miguel Island (Azores) at an altitude of 947 meters.

Local abundance in continental Europe was considered impressive, with hundreds of specimens found in a small garden. On the basis of a molecular analysis, the study also concluded that the population which has invaded several countries in Europe came from Argentina, not Brazil.

=== Obama nungara in other continents ===
Obama nungara was recorded from the French island of La Réunion, off the African coast, in a paper published in 2022. The authors considered likely that the species was already present in La Réunion since 2020. This record was the first for the species in Africa.

== Diet ==
In southern Brazil, O. nungara (identified as O. marmorata) was reported to feed on the invasive land planarian Endeavouria septemlineata.

Obama has been reported to feed on earthworms and land snails. As a result, it may pose a threat to native populations of these groups in Europe. More precisely, a 2022 study based on metabarcoding of the gut contents of specimens of O. nungara collected in France showed that the flatworm consumes a variety of earthworm species. Although O. nungara is known to live above ground, the earthworms were as well species from the surface and, unexpectedly, species living within the soil.
