= Othelosoma hepaticarum =

Scientific classification
- Domain: Eukaryota
- Kingdom: Animalia
- Phylum: Platyhelminthes
- Order: Tricladida
- Family: Geoplanidae
- Genus: Othelosoma
- Species: O. hepaticarum

Binomial name
- Othelosoma hepaticarum (Jameson, 1907)

Synonyms
- Amblyplana hepaticarum Jameson, 1907; Artiocotylus hepaticarum (Jameson, 1907)

Species of planarian

Othelosoma hepaticarum, the toffee flatworm, is a species of land planarian in the family Microplaninae endemic to South Africa.

== Description ==
Othelosoma hepaticarum generally is around 35–40 mm long and 3 mm wide. The dorsal side is a dark brown color, and the ventral side can vary from a light, fawn-like color to an unpigmented white. On the dorsal side there is a light brown or fawn midline; the pigment on the rest of the dorsal surface is slightly darker as it approaches the line's edge.

== Distribution and habitat ==
Othelosoma hepaticarum is endemic to South Africa. The type specimens were found in the Kwazulu-Natal province, in damp earth under liverworts and stones; observations have additionally been made in other areas of the country such as within the Gauteng and Western Cape provinces.
