= Geobenazzia =

Geobenazzia tyrrhenica

Scientific classification
- Domain: Eukaryota
- Kingdom: Animalia
- Phylum: Platyhelminthes
- Order: Tricladida
- Family: Geoplanidae
- Subfamily: Microplaninae
- Genus: Geobenazzia; Minelli, 1974
- Species: G. tyrrhenica

Binomial name
- Geobenazzia tyrrhenica Minelli, 1974

Genus of flatworms

Geobenazzia is a genus of land planarians that currently contains a single species, Geobenazzia tyrrhenica, found in Elba, Italy.

== Description ==
The anatomy of Geobenazzia tyrrhenica is very similar to that of Othelosoma species, the main difference being the presence of an adenodactyl, a finger-like glandular projection, in the copulatory apparatus. The male copulatory apparatus has a large seminal vesicle and a penis papilla, while the female organ has a seminal bursa (or bursa copulatrix) connected to the vagina by one duct. There is also a duct connecting the female genital atrium to the intestine.
