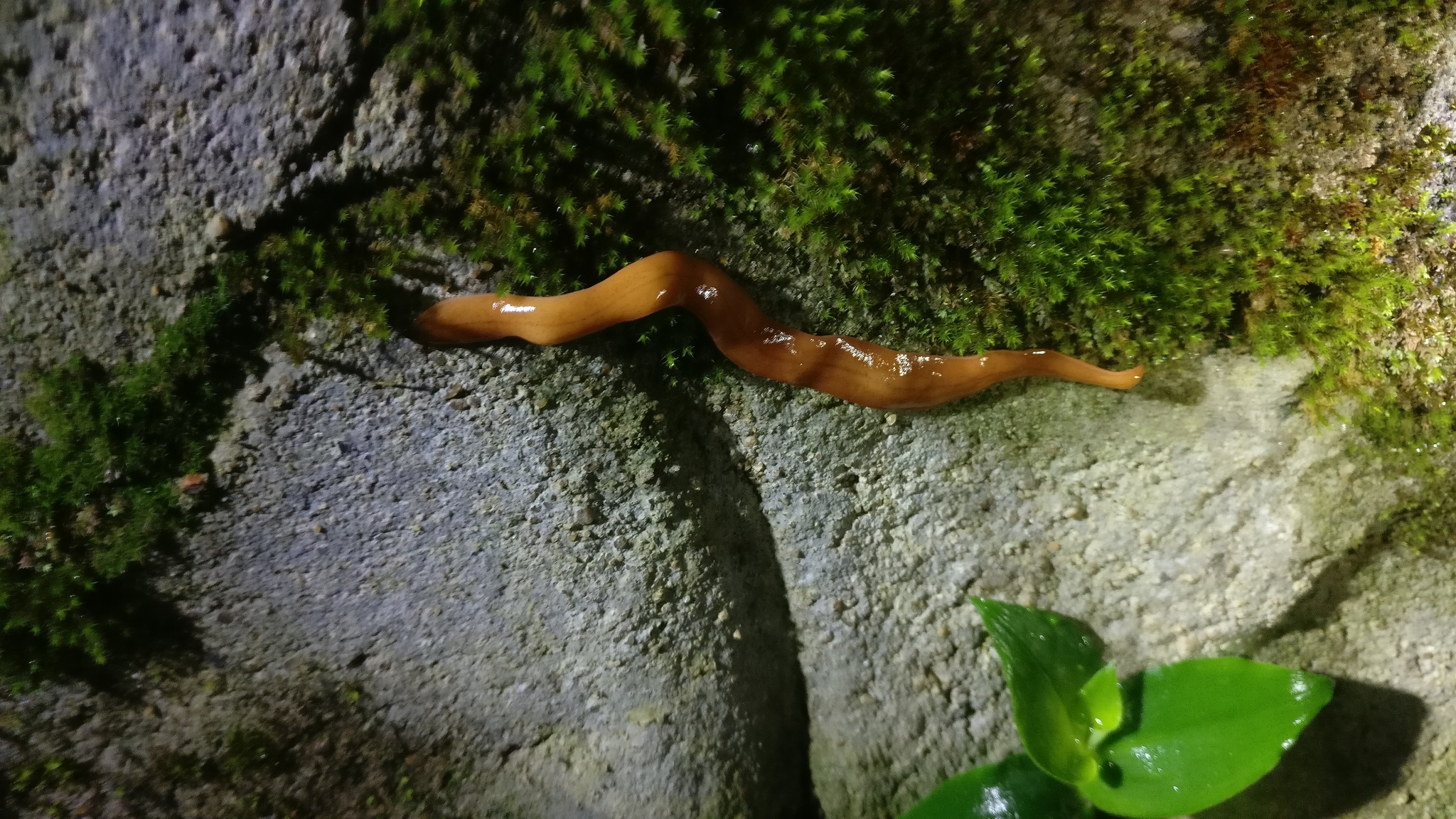

Scientific classification
- Domain: Eukaryota
- Kingdom: Animalia
- Phylum: Platyhelminthes
- Order: Tricladida
- Family: Geoplanidae
- Genus: Incapora
- Species: I. anamallensis

Binomial name
- Incapora anamallensis (de Beauchamp, 1930)

Synonyms
- Rhynchodemus anamallensis de Beauchamp, 1930

= Incapora anamallensis =

Species of flatworm

Incapora anamallensis is a species of land planarian belonging to the subfamily Microplaninae. It is found in Tamil Nadu, India.

== Etymology ==
The specific epithet, anamallensis, while not explicitly stated, is presumed to derived from one of the species' type localities, Anaimalai Hills.

== Description ==
I. anamallensis is about 40 mm long and 4 mm wide. The backside can range from an earthy yellow to a yellow-brown in color, with a dark midline. The underside is a pale color.

== Distribution ==
Type specimens of the species were all found within the Western Ghats in the state of Tamil Nadu in India; of two original specimens, one was found in the taluk of Valparai, in Anaimalai Hills, while the other was found at the peak of Vandaravu in the Palani Hills.
