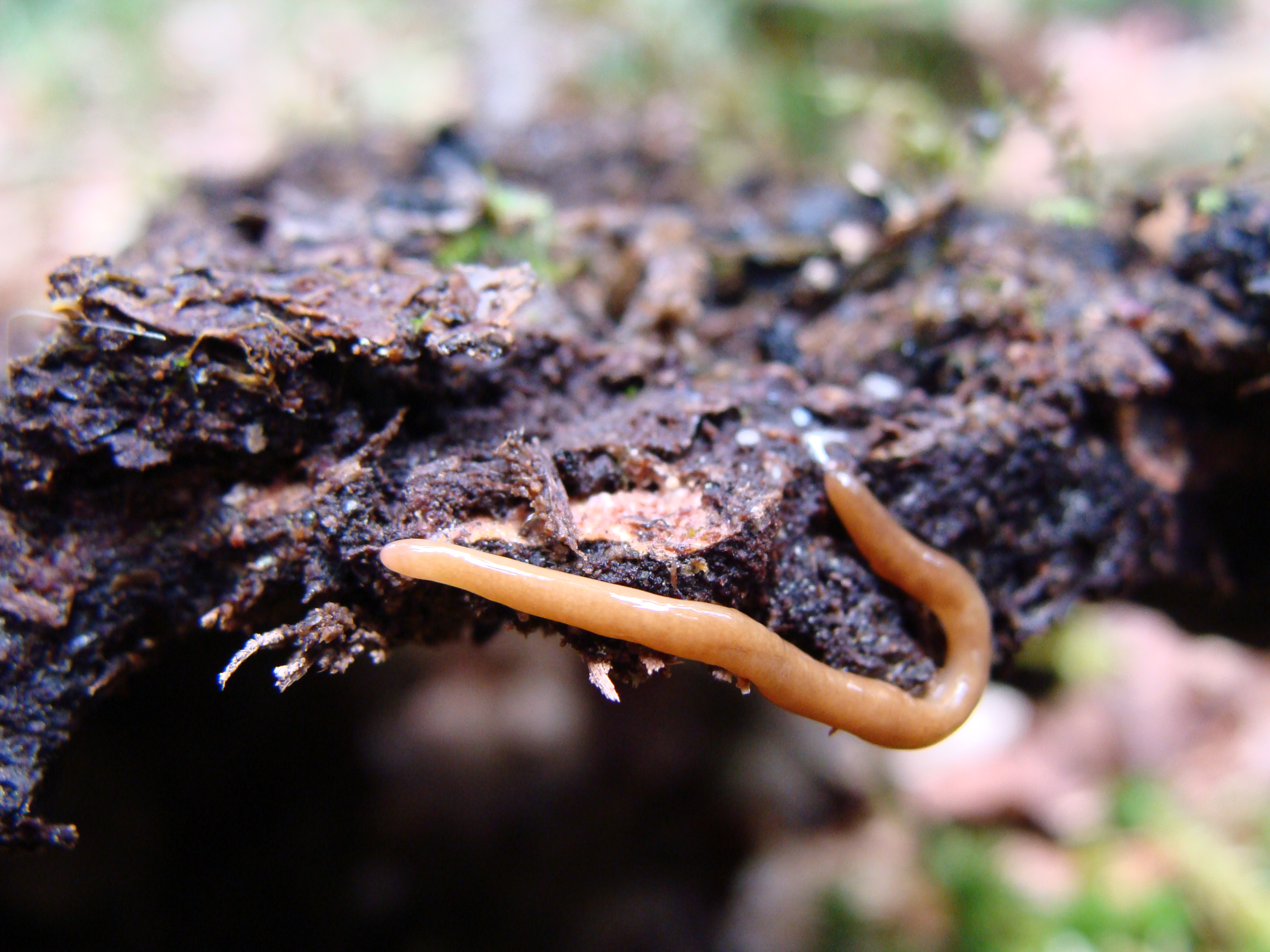

Scientific classification
- Kingdom: Animalia
- Phylum: Platyhelminthes
- Order: Tricladida
- Family: Geoplanidae
- Genus: Microplana
- Species: M. robusta

Binomial name
- Microplana robusta Vila-Farré & Sluys, 2011

= Microplana robusta =

Species of planarian

Microplana robusta is a species of land planarian belonging to the subfamily Microplaninae. It is found in Spain.

== Etymology ==
The specific epithet is derived from the Latin robustus, meaning "strong, firm", alluding to the large body size.

== Description ==
M. robusta is distinguished from other members of the genus Microplana via its muscular penis bulb, with circular and longitudinal muscle fibers, short penis papilla, short genito-intestinal duct, and a lack of a copulatory bursa.

M. robusta can reach up to 50 mm long and is around 2–3 mm wide. The body is cylindrical, bluntly pointed on both ends. The backside is an orange color; the color darkens slightly as it goes from front to back.
