= Othelosoma flavescens =

Scientific classification
- Domain: Eukaryota
- Kingdom: Animalia
- Phylum: Platyhelminthes
- Order: Tricladida
- Family: Geoplanidae
- Genus: Othelosoma
- Species: O. flavescens

Binomial name
- Othelosoma flavescens (Jameson, 1907)

Synonyms
- Amblyplana flavescens Jameson, 1907; Artiocotylus flavescens (Jameson, 1907)

Species of planarian

Othelosoma flavescens, the yellowish flatworm, is a species of land planarian in the family Microplaninae endemic to South Africa.

== Description ==
Othelosoma flavescens generally reaches up to 55 mm long, but when creeping, can reach 80 mm. The dorsal side is a yellow color, and the ventral side is slightly paler. A brown midline on the dorsal side runs from the back end to around 6–8 mm from the front. The creeping sole is a whitish color.
