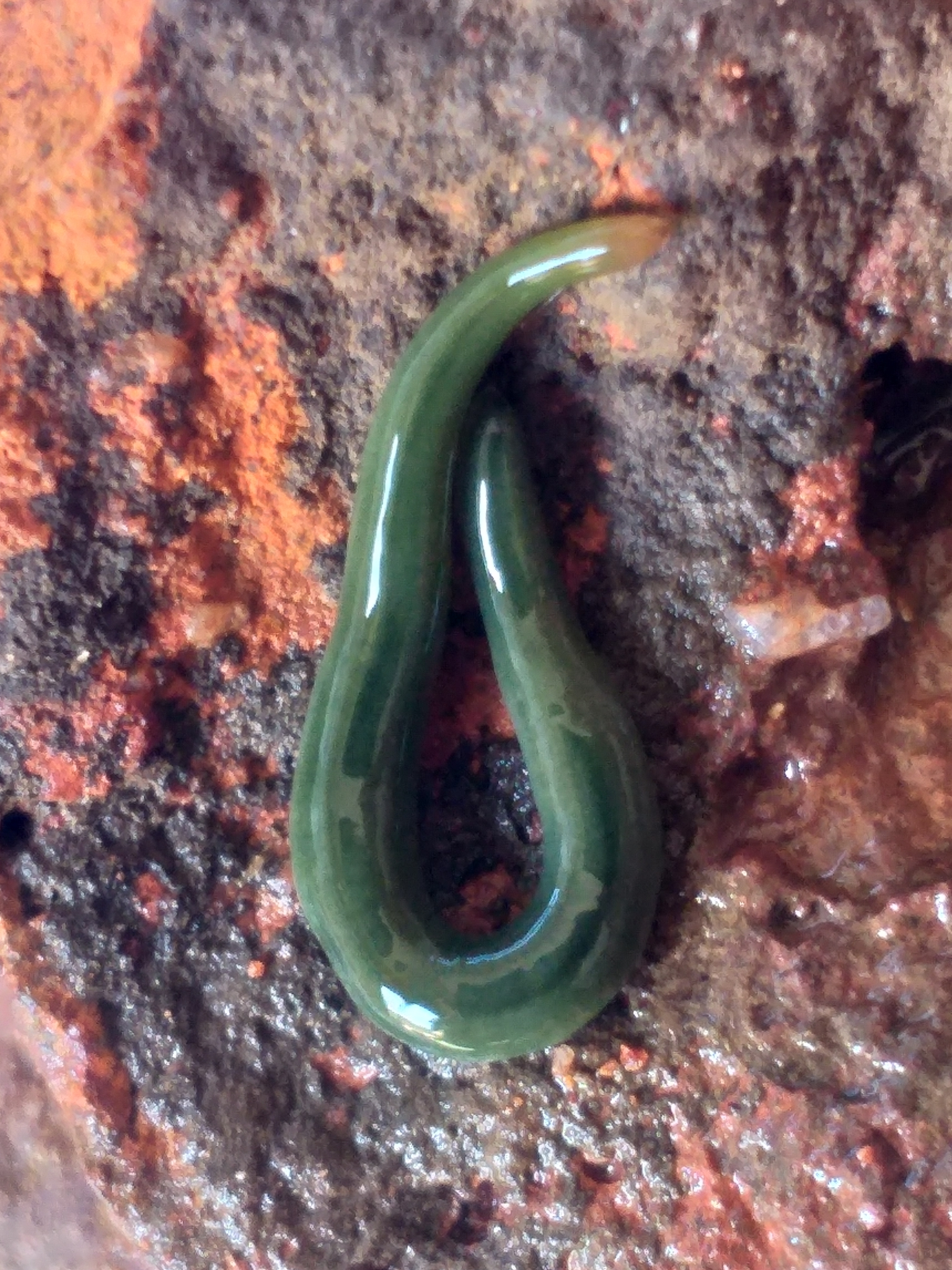
- Othelosoma joburgi from Mossel Bay

Scientific classification
- Kingdom: Animalia
- Phylum: Platyhelminthes
- Order: Tricladida
- Family: Geoplanidae
- Genus: Othelosoma
- Species: O. joburgi

Binomial name
- Othelosoma joburgi Jones, 2004

= Othelosoma joburgi =

Species of planarian

Othelosoma joburgi, the sickgreen flatworm, is a species of land planarian belonging to the subfamily Microplaninae. It is native to South Africa.

== Taxonomy ==
Othelosoma joburgi was described in 2004 by H. D. Jones of the University of Manchester, from type specimens found in Roodepoort, South Africa. The specific epithet is derived from Jo'burg, a colloquial name for Johannesburg and by extension the City of Johannesburg Metropolitan Municipality, of which Roodepoort is part of.

== Description ==
Othelosoma joburgi, from type specimens, can range from generally 6–15 mm long and 1–3 mm wide in size. The defining feature of Othelosoma joburgi is its "sick-green" color, which is nearly uniform all across the dorsal side of the body. The ventral side is white in color with no visible markings; two small eyes are on the anterior ventral side.
