= Othelosoma conyum =

Scientific classification
- Kingdom: Animalia
- Phylum: Platyhelminthes
- Order: Tricladida
- Family: Geoplanidae
- Genus: Othelosoma
- Species: O. conyum

Binomial name
- Othelosoma conyum Marcus, 1953

Species of planarian

Othelosoma conyum is a species of land planarians in the family Microplaninae. It is found in the Democratic Republic of the Congo.

== Taxonomy ==
Othelosoma conyum was first described in 1953 by zoologist Ernst Marcus. The description was part of many made by Marcus for a collection of triclads brought to him from an exploration in Upemba National Park regarding endemic flora and fauna.

== Description ==
Othelosoma conyum is around 22–26 mm long and around 1.4 mm wide. The body is bluntly rounded at the front and tapers towards the back. The dorsal side is a rusty brown color that lightens as it approaches the ventral side; the ventral side is a whitish color. The front end of the dorsal side is slightly darker than the rest. The dorsal side has a black midline flanked by two lighter bands.
