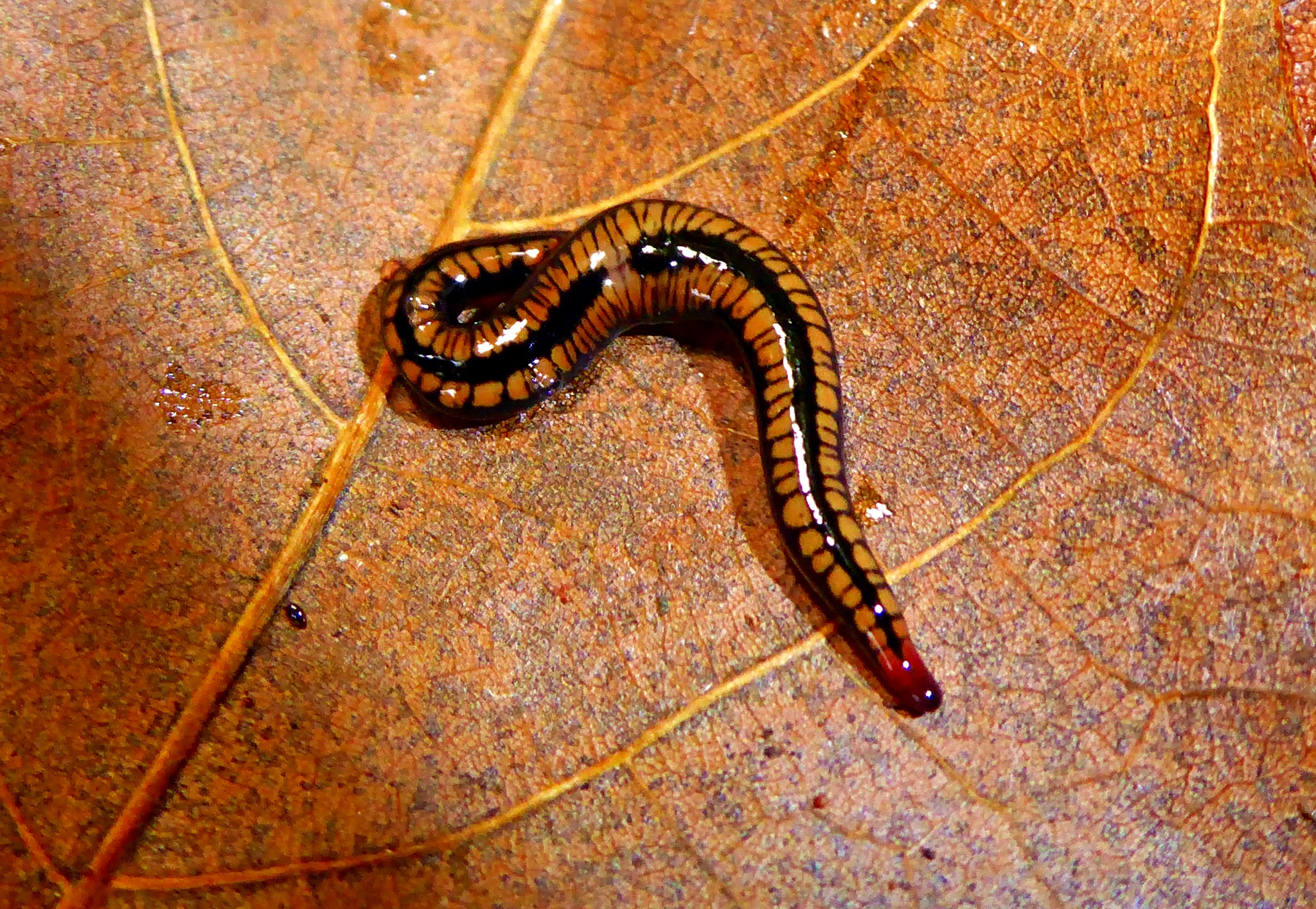

Scientific classification
- Kingdom: Animalia
- Phylum: Platyhelminthes
- Order: Tricladida
- Family: Geoplanidae
- Genus: Othelosoma
- Species: O. duplamaculosum

Binomial name
- Othelosoma duplamaculosum Sluys & Neumann, 2017

= Othelosoma duplamaculosum =

Species of flatworm

Othelosoma duplamaculosum is a species of land planarian from São Tomé Island.

== Description ==
Othelosoma duplamaculosum measures about 2.5 centimetres (0.98 in) in length. Its dorsal side is black and covered by irregular yellow-ochre spots forming two lateral rows. The ventral side is white with small irregular black specks also forming two very irregular bands. The anterior end has two rather large eyes and may have a reddish tinge.

== Etymology ==
The specific epithet duplamaculosum comes from Latin duplus, twofold, double + maculosus, spotted, and refers to the rows of spots on both the dorsal and ventral surfaces.

== Distribution ==
Othelosoma duplamaculosum is distributed throughout the whole São Tomé Island. The type locality is Monte Café, but it was also recorded in Pico de São Tomé and Ribeira Peixe.
