= Statomicroplana =

Scientific classification
- Kingdom: Animalia
- Phylum: Platyhelminthes
- Order: Tricladida
- Family: Geoplanidae
- Subfamily: Microplaninae
- Genus: Statomicroplana; Kawakatsu, Froehlich, Jones, Ogren & Sasaki, 2003

Genus of flatworms

Statomicroplana is a genus of land planarians of the subfamily Microplaninae. It was erected to include species lacking sufficient morphological information to allow them to be classified in the appropriate genus.

== Taxonomy ==
Many species of land planarians described during the second half of the 19th century and the first half of the 20th century were classified based solely on external characters. Currently, land planarian genera are highly based on internal anatomy, especially the anatomy of the copulatory apparatus. As a result, species with old descriptions that were never redescribed, so that their internal anatomy remains unknown, cannot be assigned to the correct genus. Thus, the genus Statomicroplana was erected to temporarily accommodate species of the subfamily Microplaninae whose anatomy of the copulatory apparatus is still unknown.

== Species ==
The genus Statomicroplana currently contains the following species:

- Statomicroplana capensis (Graff, 1899)
- Statomicroplana cockerelli (Graff, 1899)
- Statomicroplana ehrenbergi (Graff, 1899)
- Statomicroplana flavum (Moseley, 1877)
- Statomicroplana fuliginea (Graff, 1899)
- Statomicroplana fuscum (Moseley, 1877)
- Statomicroplana gebavoeltzkowi (Ogren & Kawakatsu, 1988)
- Statomicroplana haeckeli (Graff, 1899)
- Statomicroplana knysensis (Graff, 1899)
- Statomicroplana kuekenthali (Mell, 1903)
- Statomicroplana pyrenaica (Graff, 1893)
- Statomicroplana ruteocephala (Kaburaki, 1922)
- Statomicroplana teres (Graff, 1899)
- Statomicroplana tetracladea (Wilczysnki, 1920)
- Statomicroplana zenkeri (Graff, 1899)
