= Diporodemus =

Scientific classification
- Kingdom: Animalia
- Phylum: Platyhelminthes
- Order: Tricladida
- Family: Geoplanidae
- Subfamily: Microplaninae
- Genus: Diporodemus; Hyman, 1938

Type species
- Diporodemus yucatani Hyman, 1938

Genus of flatworms

Diporodemus is a genus of land planarians found in the Americas.

== Description ==
The genus Diporodemus is characterized by the copulatory apparatus having a large seminal bursa (or bursa copulatrix) connected to the vagina by a canal, called Beauchamp's canal. This bursa also opens to the exterior by a canal and a pore situated behind the common gonopore.

== Species ==
Currently, there are 5 species assigned to the genus Diporodemus:

- Diporodemus hymanae E. M. Froehlich & Froehlich, 1972
- Diporodemus indigenus Hyman, 1943
- Diporodemus merridithae Glasgow, 2013
- Diporodemus plenus Hyman, 1941
- Diporodemus yucatani Hyman, 1938
