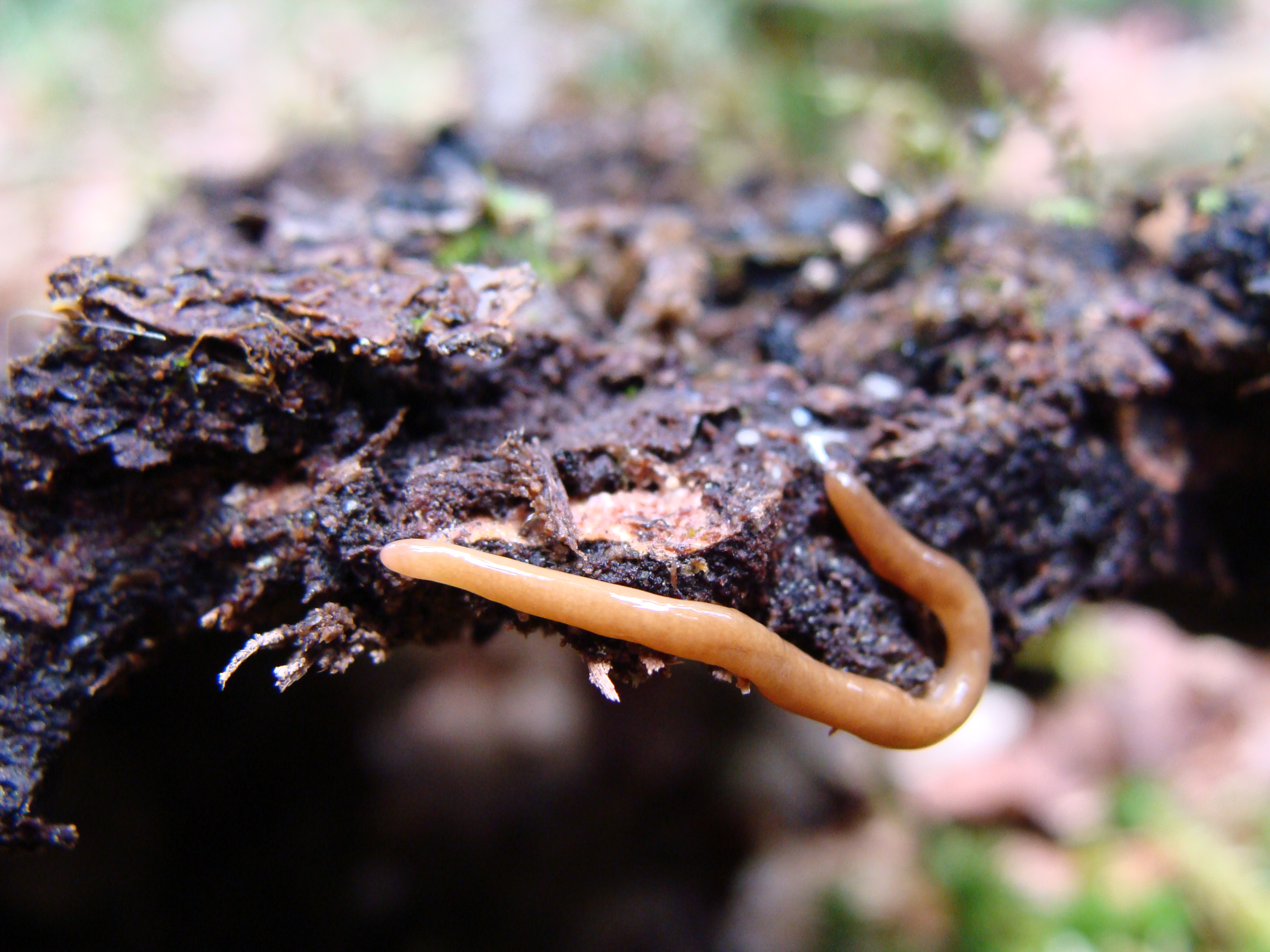
- Microplana robusta

Scientific classification
- Kingdom: Animalia
- Phylum: Platyhelminthes
- Order: Tricladida
- Family: Geoplanidae
- Subfamily: Microplaninae
- Genus: Microplana; Vejdovsky, 1890

Type species
- Microplana humicola Vejdovsky, 1890

Synonyms
- Orthodemus Hyman, 1954

= Microplana =

Genus of flatworms

Microplana is a genus of land planarians found in Europe and Africa.

== Description ==
Species of the genus Microplana are characterized by having an elongate, rounded body and generally only two eyes. The copulatory apparatus has a permanent conical penis with a muscular bulbus projecting into a short atrium. A genito-intestinal canal or a bursa copulatrix is usually present, connecting the intestine to the female atrium.

== Ecology ==
Species of Microplana are adapted to different habitats. Most species occur in temperate forests, including beech, oak, pine and mixed forests, and seem to prefer neutral to basic soils, with pH values above 6. However, there are species adapted to drier habitats, such as the African savanna.

All Microplana species are carnivores, feeding on other invertebrates. Some are active predators, while others are mainly scavengers.

== Species ==
The genus Microplana includes the following species:

- Microplana aberana (Mell, 1904)
- Microplana aixandrei Vila-Farré, Mateos, Sluys & Romero, 2008
- Microplana astricta Sluys, Álvarez-Presas & Mateos, 2017
- Microplana atropurpurea (von Graff, 1899)
- Microplana attemsi (Bendl, 1909)
- Microplana cephalofusca Sluys, Álvarez-Presas & Mateos, 2017
- Microplana ceylonica (von Graff, 1899)
- Microplana cherangani (de Beauchamp, 1936)
- Microplana cingulata Álvarez-Presas, Sluys & Mateos, 2017
- Microplana costaricensis (de Beauchamp, 1913)
- Microplana edwardsi Jones & McDonald, 2021
- Microplana fuscomaculosa Sluys, Mateos & Álvarez-Presas, 2017
- Microplana gadesensis Vila-Farré, Mateos, Sluys & Romero, 2008
- Microplana garavi Du Bois-Reymond Marcus, 1957
- Microplana giustii Minelli, 1976
- Microplana graffi (Geba, 1909)
- Microplana grazalemica Vila-Farré, Mateos, Sluys & Romero, 2008
- Microplana groga Jones, Webster, Littlewood & McDonald, 2008
- Microplana haitiensis Prudhoe, 1949
- Microplana harea Marcus, 1953
- Microplana henrici (Bendl, 1908)
- Microplana hovassei (de Beauchamp, 1934)
- Microplana howesi (Scharff, 1900)
- Microplana humicola Vejdovsky, 1889
- Microplana hyalina Vila-Farré & Sluys, 2011
- Microplana indica (Chaurasia, 1985)
- Microplana kwiskea Jones, Webster, Littlewood & McDonald, 2008
- Microplana lutulenta Álvarez-Presas, Sluys & Mateos, 2017
- Microplana mediostriata (Geba, 1909)
- Microplana montoyai (Fuhrmann, 1914)
- Microplana nana Mateos, Giribet & Carranza, 1998
- Microplana natalensis (Jameson, 1907)
- Microplana nervosa Sluys, Mateos & Álvarez-Presas, 2017
- Microplana neumanni (Mell, 1904)
- Microplana peneckei (Meixner, 1921)
- Microplana perereca Marcus & Du Bois-Reymond Marcus, 1959
- Microplana plurioculata Sluys, Mateos & Álvarez-Presas, 2016
- Microplana polyopsis Sluys, Álvarez-Presas & Mateos, 2016
- Microplana purpurea (Bendl, 1908)
- Microplana robusta Vila-Farré & Sluys, 2011
- Microplana rufocephalata Hyman, 1954
- Microplana scharffi (Graff, 1896)
- Microplana shenzhensis Wang & Yu, 2013
- Microplana sparsa Sluys, Mateos & Álvarez-Presas, 2017
- Microplana termitophaga Jones, Darlington & Newson, 1990
- Microplana terrestris (Müller, 1774)
- Microplana thwaitesii (Moseley, 1875)
- Microplana trifuscolineata (Kaburaki, 1920)
- Microplana tristriata (Geba, 1909)
- Microplana uniductus (de Beauchamp, 1930)
- Microplana unilineata (Frieb, 1923)
- Microplana viridis (Jameson, 1907)
- Microplana voeltzkowi (von Graff, 1899)
- Microplana yaravi du Bois-Reymond Marcus, 1957
