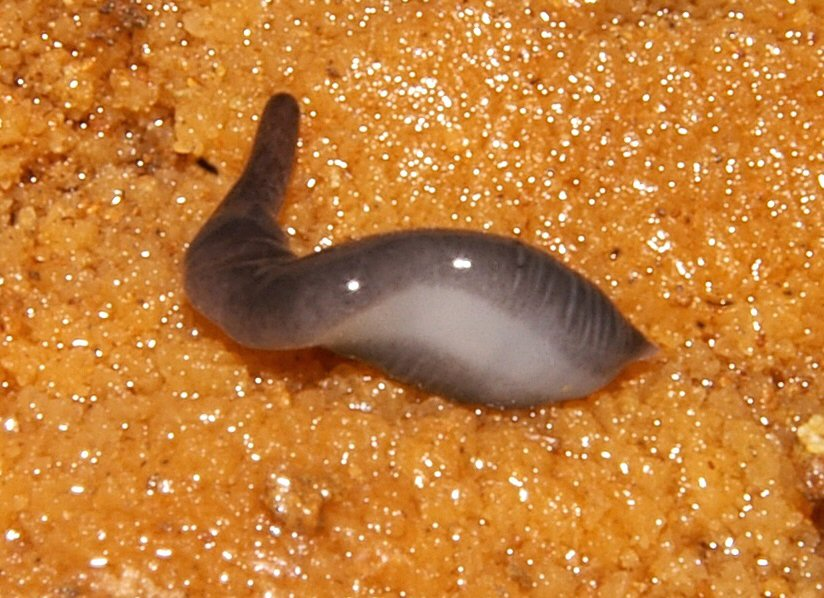

Scientific classification
- Kingdom: Animalia
- Phylum: Platyhelminthes
- Order: Tricladida
- Family: Geoplanidae
- Genus: Microplana
- Species: M. terrestris

Binomial name
- Microplana terrestris (O. F. Müller, 1773)

Synonyms
- List: Fasciola terrestris Müller OF, 1773; Geodesmus atrocyaneus Walton, 1912; Geodesmus terrestris (Müller OF, 1773); Microplana albicollis (Graff, 1899); Microplana atrocyanea (Walton, 1912); Microplana carli Fuhrmann, 1914; Microplana mahnerti Minelli, 1977; Microplana richardi (Bendl, 1909); Microplana styriaca (Freisling, 1935); Orthodemus albicollis (Graff, 1899); Orthodemus terrestris (Müller OF, 1773); Rhynchodemus albicollis Graff, 1899; Rhynchodemus atrocyaneus (Walton, 1912); Rhynchodemus carli Fuhrmann, 1914; Rhynchodemus richardi Bendl, 1909; Rhynchodemus styriacus Freisling, 1935; Rhynchodemus terrestris (Müller OF, 1773)

= Microplana terrestris =

Species of flatworm

Microplana terrestris is a species of free-living, terrestrial flatworm in the order Tricladida. It was first described in 1773 by the Danish naturalist Otto Friedrich Müller as Fasciola terrestris, but has since been reassigned to the genus Microplana.

== Description ==
Microplana terrestris, like all flatworms, is an unsegmented, soft-bodied bilaterian without a body cavity, and with no specialized circulatory or respiratory organs. Like other members of Geoplanidae, it is dorso-ventrally flattened and creeps along with the whole of its ventral surface in contact with the substrate. It is between 1 and 2 cm (0.4 and 0.8 in) in length and between 1 and 2 mm (0.04 and 0.08 in) wide. The anterior end is blunt and the colour is usually black or dark grey.

== Distribution ==
Microplana terrestris is native to Western Europe. Its range extends from Sweden in the north to the United Kingdom and Ireland and France, to Greece in the east. It requires a moist habitat. It has also been introduced into North America.

== Ecology and behavior ==
Cilia provide the propulsive force when this flatworm moves. It can also produce stationary muscular waves along its body which can speed up its progression. It produces mucus as it moves, and when using stationary waves, leaves intermittent "footprints" of slime. It can use its mucus trail as a "suspension bridge" to pass from one leaf to another.

This flatworm is a generalist carnivore, feeding mostly on earthworms, slugs, snails and small arthropods. It rarely attacks live, uninjured specimens, preferring to feed on dead or injured prey.

Sexual reproduction occurs but it is able and frequently does reproduce without mating, producing cocoons containing several hatchlings. The first cocoon is produced 195 (±75) days after hatching and a further cocoon is produced about once a month thereafter. In the laboratory, one individual lived for 39 months. This flatworm is able to regenerate after being cut into two pieces, although it appears to greatly reduce its longevity.
