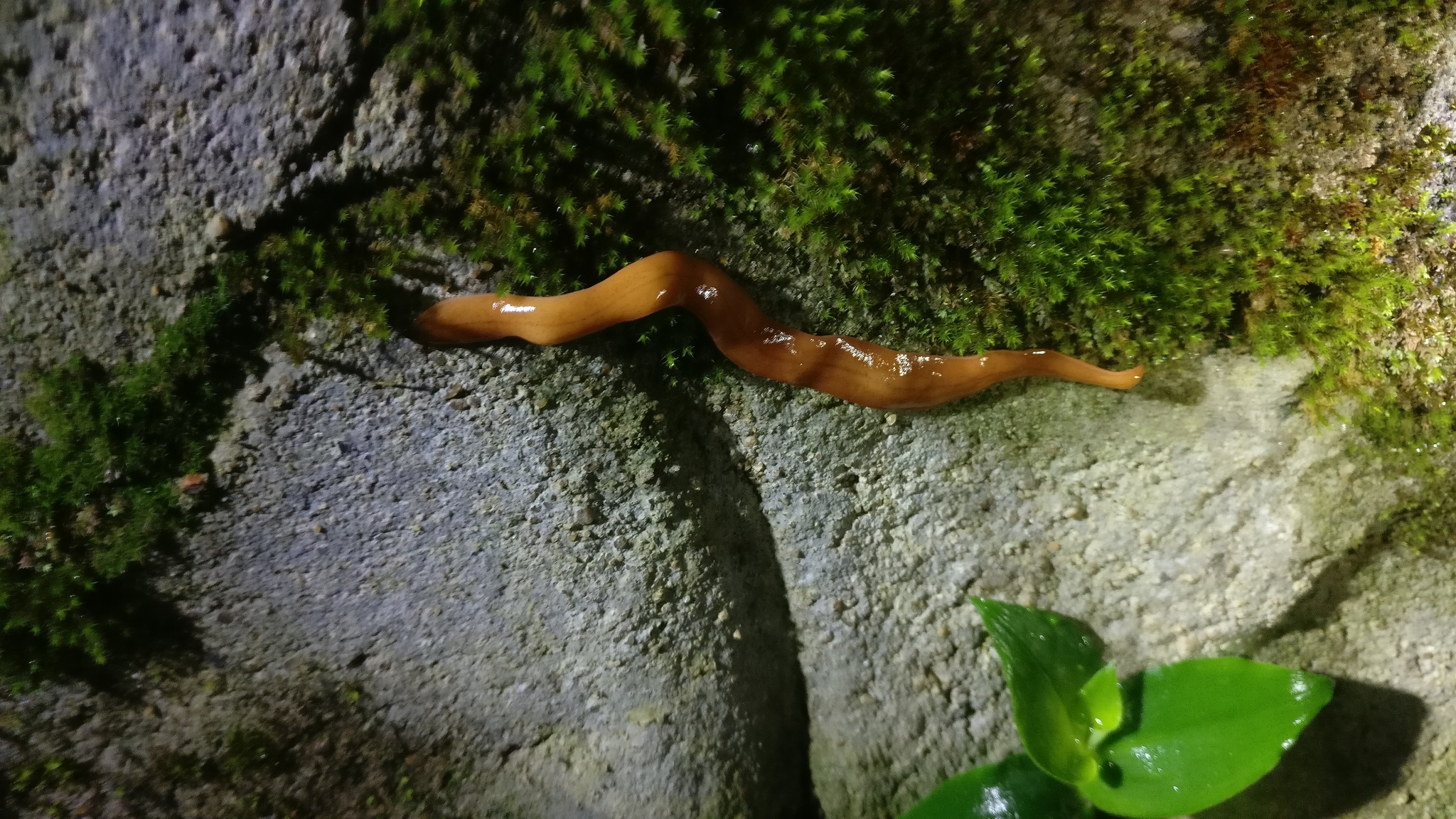
- Incapora anamallensis

Scientific classification
- Domain: Eukaryota
- Kingdom: Animalia
- Phylum: Platyhelminthes
- Order: Tricladida
- Family: Geoplanidae
- Subfamily: Microplaninae
- Genus: Incapora; Du Bois-Reymond Marcus, 1953

Type species
- Incapora weyrauchi Du Bois-Reymond Marcus, 1953

= Incapora =

Genus of flatworms

Incapora is a genus of land planarians in the subfamily Microplaninae.

== Description ==
Species of the genus Incapora are characterized by the presence of two ventral orifices that lead to the posterior branches of the gut. These intestinal branches also connect to the copulatory apparatus by anastomosis with the bursal canal.

== Species ==
The genus Incapora contains only two species:

- Incapora anamallensis (de Beauchamp, 1930)
- Incapora weyrauchi Du Bois-Reymond Marcus, 1953
