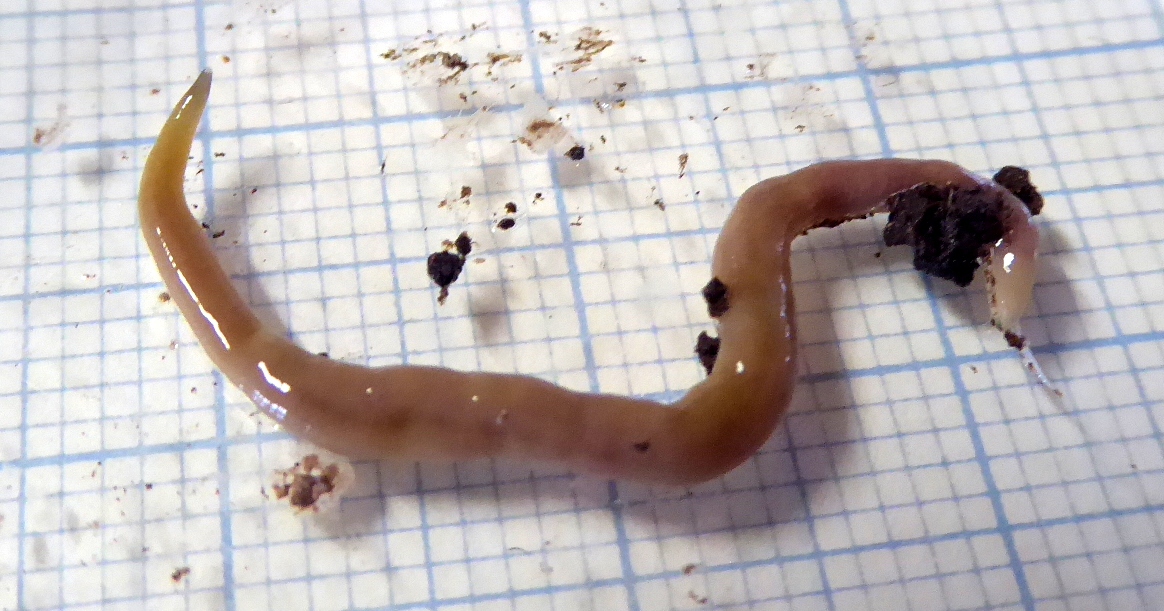

Scientific classification
- Kingdom: Animalia
- Phylum: Platyhelminthes
- Order: Tricladida
- Family: Geoplanidae
- Genus: Microplana
- Species: M. scharffi

Binomial name
- Microplana scharffi (Graff, 1899)

= Microplana scharffi =

Species of flatworm

Microplana scharffi is a species of free-living, terrestrial flatworm in the order Tricladida. It was first described in 1899 by the Austrian zoologist Ludwig von Graff.

== Description ==
Microplana scharffi, like all flatworms, is an unsegmented, soft-bodied bilaterian without a body cavity, and with no specialized circulatory or respiratory organs. Like other members of the Geoplanidae, it is dorso-ventrally flattened and creeps along with the whole of its ventral surface in contact with the substrate. It is between 5 and 7 centimetres (2.0 and 2.8 in) in length. The colour is whitish; in UK, yellow and cream are the most abundant colours but other colours are found.

== Distribution ==
Microplana scharffi is native to Western Europe. It has been recorded in the UK and other countries of Europe including Belgium, Bulgaria, Ireland, Italy, Madeira Island, Turkey and France.

== Ecology and behavior ==
This flatworm is a carnivore, like all Geoplanidae. In the UK, earthworms accounted for 87% of M. scharffi prey.

Microplana scharffi can survive for long periods without food. One captive individual survived for 139 days, even laying a cocoon during this time.

== Molecular characterisation ==
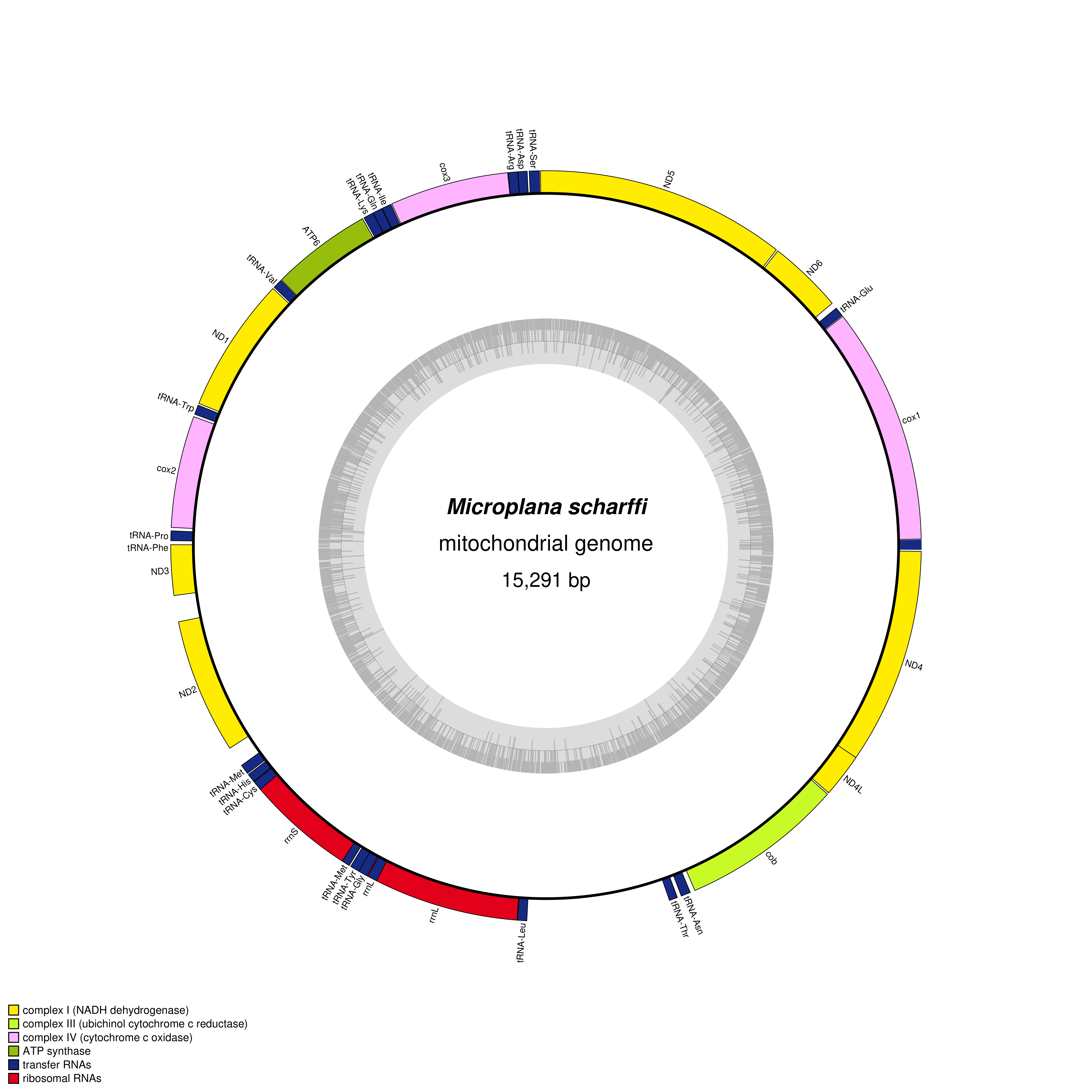
The mitogenome of Microplana scharffi

In 2024, a study described the complete mitogenome of Microplana scharffi, the two paralogous versions of its 18S gene, the elongation factor gene EF1α, and two genes involved in the regeneration process, coding for β-catenin-1 and adenomatous polyposis coli. The 15,297 bp mitogenome lacks a functional tRNA-Ala and has a mandatory alternative TTG start codon in its cox1 gene.

The multiprotein phylogeny, inferred from mitogenome proteins, positioned Microplana scharffi as sister-group to the Bipaliinae.
