= Pseudartiocotylus =

Pseudartiocotylus ceylonicus

Scientific classification
- Domain: Eukaryota
- Kingdom: Animalia
- Phylum: Platyhelminthes
- Order: Tricladida
- Family: Geoplanidae
- Genus: Pseudartiocotylus; Ikeda, 1911
- Species: P. ceylonicus

Binomial name
- Pseudartiocotylus ceylonicus Ikeda, 1911

Genus of flatworms

Pseudartiocotylus is a genus of land planarians that currently contains a single species, Pseudartiocotylus ceylonicus, found in Namunukula, Sri Lanka.

== Description ==
The original description of Pseudartiocotylus states that the worm has a relatively short strap-like body and that there is a watch glass-like sense organ between the eyes, as well as two ambulacral pits on the ventral side of the anterior end. This description, however, is too incomplete to correctly define the genus and further studies are needed.
