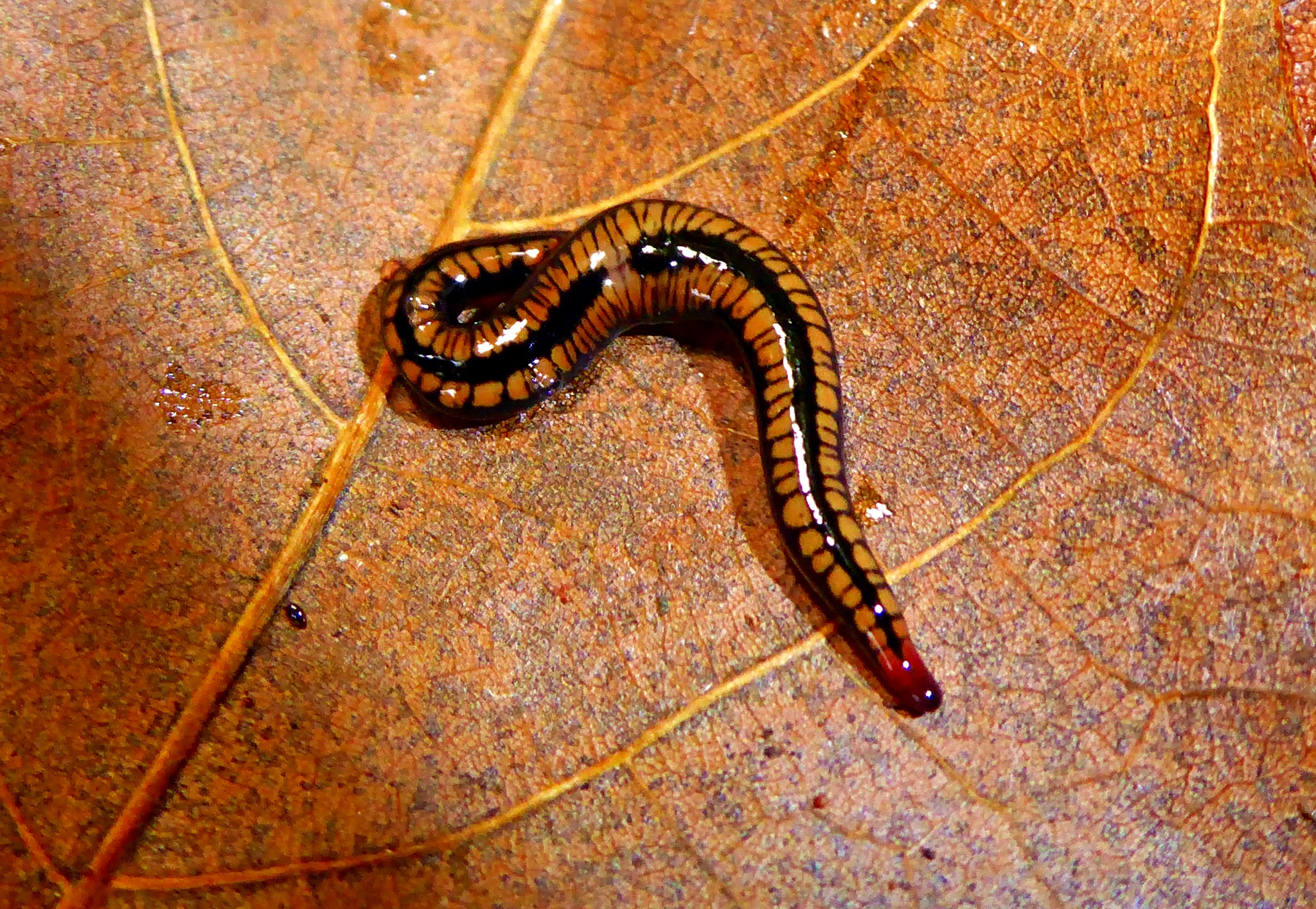
- Othelosoma duplamaculosum

Scientific classification
- Domain: Eukaryota
- Kingdom: Animalia
- Phylum: Platyhelminthes
- Order: Tricladida
- Family: Geoplanidae
- Subfamily: Microplaninae
- Genus: Othelosoma; Gray, 1869

Type species
- Othelosoma symondsii Gray, 1869

= Othelosoma =

Genus of flatworms

Othelosoma is a genus of land planarians found in Africa and India.

== Description ==
The genus Othelosoma is characterized by having an elongate, rounded body, generally only two eyes and a blunt anterior end. The copulatory apparatus has a permanent penis. The bursa copulatrix is large and communicates with the genital atrium by two canals, the vaginal duct and the Beauchamp's canal.

== Species ==
There are 40 species assigned to the genus Othelosoma:

- Othelosoma africanum (von Graff, 1899)
- Othelosoma angolense (de Beauchamp, 1951)
- Othelosoma caffrum (Jameson, 1907)
- Othelosoma chinum (Marcus, 1955)
- Othelosoma conyum (Marcus, 1953)
- Othelosoma cylindricum (de Beauchamp, 1913)
- Othelosoma duplamaculosum Sluys & Neumann, 2017
- Othelosoma evelinae Marcus, 1970
- Othelosoma flavescens (Jameson, 1907)
- Othelosoma gnaum Marcus, 1955
- Othelosoma gravelyi (de Beauchamp, 1930)
- Othelosoma hepaticarum (Jameson, 1907)
- Othelosoma hirudineum (de Beauchamp, 1930)
- Othelosoma huntum Marcus, 1955
- Othelosoma impensum Sluys & Neumann, 2017
- Othelosoma joburgi Jones, 2004
- Othelosoma kukkal (de Beauchamp, 1930)
- Othelosoma laticlavium Sluys & Neumann, 2017
- Othelosoma lineaenigrum Sluys & Neumann, 2017
- Othelosoma macrothylax (de Beauchamp, 1936)
- Othelosoma marcusi de Beauchamp, 1956
- Othelosoma marlieri de Beauchamp, 1956
- Othelosoma musculosum (de Beauchamp, 1930)
- Othelosoma nigrescens (Mell, 1904)
- Othelosoma notabile (von Graff, 1899)
- Othelosoma nyanga Jones & Cumming, 2005
- Othelosoma polecatum Marcus, 1953
- Othelosoma pugum Marcus, 1953
- Othelosoma retractile (de Beauchamp, 1930)
- Othelosoma rudebecki Marcus, 1955
- Othelosoma saegeri Marcus, 1955
- Othelosoma sholanum (de Beauchamp, 1930)
- Othelosoma simile Sluys & Neumann, 2017
- Othelosoma speciosum (von Graff, 1896)
- Othelosoma symondsii Gray, 1869
- Othelosoma torquatum (de Beauchamp, 1930)
- Othelosoma voleum Marcus, 1953
- Othelosoma wauzen Marcus, 1955
