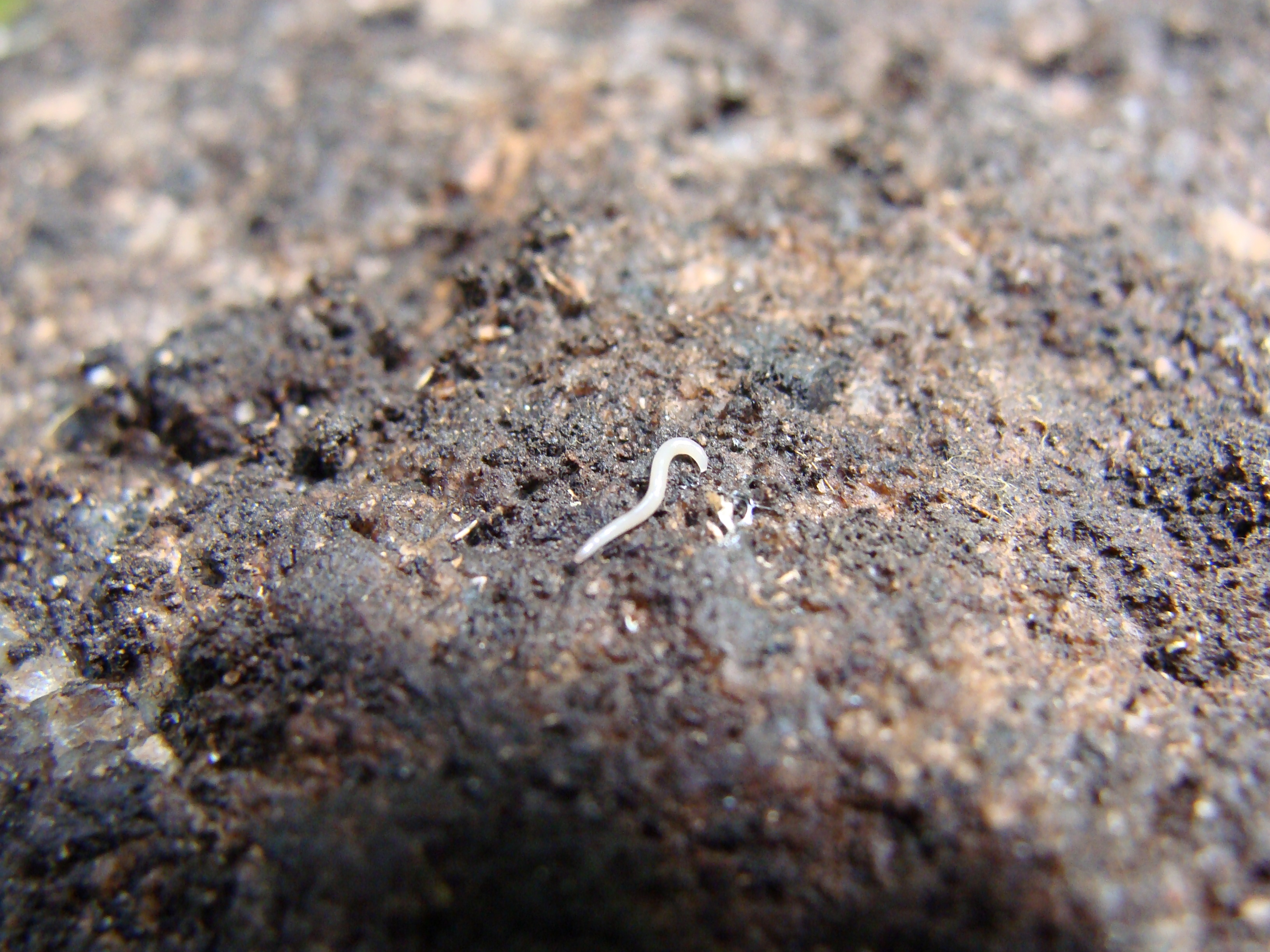
- Microplana sp.

Scientific classification
- Domain: Eukaryota
- Kingdom: Animalia
- Phylum: Platyhelminthes
- Order: Tricladida
- Family: Geoplanidae
- Subfamily: Microplaninae; Pantin, 1953

Genera
- See text

= Microplaninae =

Subfamily of flatworms

Microplaninae is a subfamily of land planarians.

== Description ==
The subfamily Microplaninae was defined by Ogren and Kawakatsu (1988) for land planarians with a short and cylindroid form, an anterior end that is blunt, eyes often small and subepithelial musculature weak. The male copulatory apparatus is often complicated and has a well-developed penis. The female apparatus is very variable, with or without a seminal bursa and with or without a connection with the intestine.

It was originally considered, based on morphological evidence, to be the sister group of the subfamily Rhynchodeminae. However, recent phylogenetic analyses indicated that both subfamilies are not closely related.

== Genera ==
Eight genera of Microplaninae are known:

- Diporodemus Hyman, 1938
- Geobenazzia Minelli, 1974
- Incapora Du Bois-Reymond Marcus, 1953
- Microplana Vejdowsky, 1890
- Othelosoma Grey, 1869
- Pseudartiocotylus Ikeda, 1911
- Statomicroplana Kawakatsu, Froehlich, Jones, Ogren & Sasaki, 2003

== Phylogeny ==
Phylogenetic tree including the land planarian subfamilies after Álvarez-Presas et al., 2008. Note that Spathula and Romankenkius belong to the Dugesiidae family:

- Geoplanoidea
  - Dugesiidae
  - Geoplanidae
    - Bipaliinae
    - - - Geoplaninae
        - - Caenoplaninae
          - Rhynchodeminae
      - - Microplaninae
        - (Spathula + Romankenkius)
