= List of RNAs =

Ribonucleic acid (RNA) occurs in different forms within organisms and serves many different roles. Listed here are the types of RNA, grouped by role. Abbreviations for the different types of RNA are listed and explained.

== By role ==
RNAs involved in protein synthesis
| Type | Abbr. | Function | Distribution | Ref. |
|---|---|---|---|---|
| Messenger RNA | mRNA | Codes for protein | All organisms | |
| Ribosomal RNA | rRNA | Translation | All organisms | |
| Signal recognition particle RNA | 7SL RNA or SRP RNA | Membrane integration | All organisms | |
| Transfer RNA | tRNA | Translation | All organisms | |
| Transfer-messenger RNA | tmRNA | Rescuing stalled ribosomes | Bacteria | |

RNAs involved in post-transcriptional modification or DNA replication
| Type | Abbr. | Function | Distribution | Ref. |
|---|---|---|---|---|
| Small nuclear RNA | snRNA | Splicing and other functions | Eukaryotes and archaea | |
| Small nucleolar RNA | snoRNA | Nucleotide modification of RNAs | Eukaryotes and archaea | |
| SmY RNA | SmY | mRNA trans-splicing | Nematodes | |
| Small Cajal body-specific RNA | scaRNA | Type of snoRNA; Nucleotide modification of RNAs | | |
| Guide RNA | gRNA | mRNA nucleotide modification | Kinetoplastid mitochondria | |
| Ribonuclease P | RNase P | tRNA maturation | All organisms | |
| Ribonuclease MRP | RNase MRP | rRNA maturation, DNA replication | Eukaryotes | |
| Y RNA | | RNA processing, DNA replication | Animals | |
| Telomerase RNA Component | TERC | Telomere synthesis | Most eukaryotes | |
| Spliced Leader RNA | SL RNA | mRNA trans-splicing, RNA processing | | |

Regulatory RNAs
| Type | Abbr. | Function | Distribution | Ref. |
|---|---|---|---|---|
| Antisense RNA | aRNA, asRNA | Transcriptional attenuation / mRNA degradation / mRNA stabilisation / Translation block | All organisms | |
| Cis-natural antisense transcript | cis-NAT | Gene regulation | | |
| CRISPR RNA | crRNA | Resistance to parasites, by targeting their DNA | Bacteria and archaea | |
| Long noncoding RNA | lncRNA | Regulation of gene transcription, epigenetic regulation | Eukaryotes | |
| MicroRNA | miRNA | Gene regulation | Most eukaryotes | |
| Piwi-interacting RNA | piRNA | Transposon defense, maybe other functions | Most animals | |
| Small interfering RNA | siRNA | Gene regulation | Most eukaryotes | |
| Short hairpin RNA | shRNA | Gene regulation | Most eukaryotes | |
| Trans-acting siRNA | tasiRNA | Gene regulation | Land plants | |
| Repeat associated siRNA | rasiRNA | Type of piRNA; transposon defense | Drosophila | |
| 7SK RNA | 7SK | negatively regulating CDK9/cyclin T complex | | |
| Enhancer RNA | eRNA | Gene regulation | | |

Parasitic RNAs
| Type | Function | Distribution | Ref. |
|---|---|---|---|
| Retrotransposon | Self-propagating | Eukaryotes and some bacteria | |
| Viral genome | Information carrier | Double-stranded RNA viruses, positive-sense RNA viruses, negative-sense RNA viruses, many satellite viruses and reverse transcribing viruses | |
| Viroid | Self-propagating | Infected plants | |
| Satellite RNA | Self-propagating | Infected cells | |

Other RNAs
| Type | Abbr. | Function | Distribution | Ref. |
|---|---|---|---|---|
| Vault RNA | vRNA, vtRNA | Expulsion of xenobiotics (conjectured) | | |
| GlycoRNA | - | Unknown | | |

== RNA abbreviations ==
| Abbr. | Name | Family | Description | Ref. |
|---|---|---|---|---|
| ncRNA | non coding RNA | - | | |
| nmRNA | non messenger RNA | - | synonym of ncRNA | |
| sRNA | small RNA | - | synonym of ncRNA | |
| smnRNA | small non messenger RNA | - | synonym of ncRNA | |
| tRNA | transfer RNA | RF00005 | | |
| sRNA | soluble RNA | - | synonym of tRNA | |
| mRNA | messenger RNA | - | | |
| pcRNA | protein coding RNA | - | synonym of mRNA | |
| rRNA | ribosomal RNA | multiple families | | |
| 5S rRNA | 5S ribosomal RNA | RF00001 | | |
| 5.8S rRNA | 5.8S ribosomal RNA | RF00002 | | |
| SSU rRNA | small subunit ribosomal RNA | CL00111 | | |
| LSU rRNA | large subunit ribosomal RNA | CL00112 | | |
| NoRC RNA | nucleolar remodeling complex associated RNA | RF01518 | | |
| pRNA | promoter RNA | RF01518 | synonym of NoRC RNA | |
| 6S RNA | 6S RNA | RF00013 | | |
| SsrS RNA | | RF00013 | synonym of 6S RNA | |
| aRNA | antisense RNA | - | synonym of asRNA | |
| asRNA | antisense RNA | - | | |
| asmiRNA | antisense micro RNA | - | | |
| cis-NAT | cis-natural antisense transcript | - | Natural antisense transcripts transcribed from the same genomic locus as their target but from the opposite DNA strand and form perfect pairs | |
| crRNA | CRISPR RNA | - | | |
| tracrRNA | trans-activating crRNA | - | | |
| CRISPR RNA | CRISPR-Cas RNA | multiple families | | |
| DD RNA | DNA damage response RNA | - | RNA that activates DNA damage response | |
| diRNA | DSB-induced small RNAs | - | | |
| dsRNA | double stranded RNA | - | | |
| endo-siRNA | endogenous small interfering RNA | - | | |
| exRNA | extracellular RNA | - | | |
| gRNA | guide RNA | - | | |
| hc-siRNA | heterochromatic small interfering RNA | - | | |
| hcsiRNA | heterochromatic small interfering RNA | - | synonym of hc-siRNA | |
| hnRNA | heterogeneous nuclear RNA | - | synonym for pre-mRNA (in the strict sense, it may include nuclear RNA transcripts that do not end up as cytoplasmic mRNA) | |
| RNAi | RNA interference | - | Process in which RNA inhibit gene expression or translation, by neutralizing targeted mRNA molecules | |
| lincRNA | long intergenic non-coding RNA | - | | |
| lncRNA | long non coding RNA | - | | |
| miRNA | micro RNA | multiple families | | |
| mrpRNA | mitochondrial RNA processing ribonuclease | - | synonym of RNase MRP | |
| nat-siRNA | natural antisense short interfering RNA | - | synonym of natsiRNA | |
| natsiRNA | natural antisense short interfering RNA | - | Endogenous RNA regulators, between 21 and 24 nt in length, and are generated from complementary mRNA transcripts which are further processed into siRNA | |
| OxyS RNA | oxidative stress response RNA | RF00035 | Small non coding RNA which is induced in response to oxidative stress in Escherichia coli | |
| piRNA | piwi-interacting RNA | multiple families | Small RNAs that form RNA-protein complexes with piwi proteins in animal cells | |
| qiRNA | QDE-2 interfering RNA | - | | |
| rasiRNA | Repeat associated siRNA | - | Small RNA that is involved in the RNA interference pathway, a type of piRNA | |
| RNase MRP | mitochondrial RNA processing ribonuclease | RF00030 | | |
| RNase P | ribonuclease P | RF00010 | A type of ribonuclease which cleaves RNA | |
| scaRNA | small Cajal body-specific RNA | RF00553 | | |
| scnRNA | small-scan RNA | - | | |
| scRNA | small cytoplasmic RNA | - | | |
| scRNA | small conditional RNA | - | | |
| SgrS RNA | sugar transport-related sRNA | RF00534 | Small RNA that is activated by SgrR in Escherichia coli during glucose-phosphate stress | |
| shRNA | short hairpin RNA | - | | |
| siRNA | small interfering RNA | - | | |
| SL RNA | spliced leader RNA | multiple families | | |
| SmY RNA | mRNA trans-splicing | RF01844 | Small nuclear RNAs found in some species of nematode worms, thought to be involved in mRNA trans-splicing | |
| snoRNA | small nucleolar RNA | multiple families | | |
| snRNA | small nuclear RNA | multiple families | | |
| snRNP | small nuclear ribonucleic proteins | - | | |
| SPA lncRNA | 5' small nucleolar RNA capped and 3' polyadenylated long noncoding RNA | - | | |
| SRP RNA | signal recognition particle RNA | CL00003 | | |
| ssRNA | single stranded RNA | - | | |
| stRNA | small temporal RNA | - | | |
| tasiRNA | trans-acting siRNA | - | | |
| tmRNA | transfer-messenger RNA | RF00023 | Bacterial RNA molecule with dual tRNA-like and messenger RNA-like properties | |
| uRNA | U spliceosomal RNA | multiple families | | |
| vRNA | vault RNA | - | synonym of vtRNA | |
| vtRNA | vault RNA | RF00006 | | |
| Xist RNA | X-inactive specific transcript | - | | |
| Y RNA | Y RNA | RF00019 | Components of the Ro60 ribonucleoprotein particle and necessary for DNA replication through interactions with chromatin and initiation proteins | |
| NATs | natural antisense transcripts | - | Natural antisense transcripts encoded within a cell that have transcript complementarity to other RNA transcripts | |
| pre-mRNA | precursor messenger RNA | - | Immature single strand of messenger RNA | |
| circRNA | circular RNA | - | | |
| msRNA | multicopy, single-stranded RNA | - | Products of a retron-encoded reverse transcriptase (RT) which form a RT-msDNA complex that acts as an anti-phage antitoxin | |
| cfRNA | cell-free RNA | - | | |

== See also ==
- List of cis-regulatory RNA elements
- RNA: Types of RNA
- Non-coding RNA
