= Ribonuclease P =

Class of enzymes

Bacterial RNase P class A
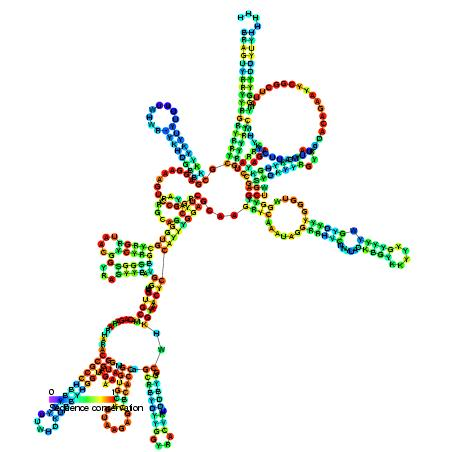
- Predicted secondary structure and sequence conservation of RNaseP_bact_a

Identifiers
- Symbol: RNaseP_bact_a
- Rfam: RF00010

Other data
- RNA type: Gene; ribozyme
- Domain: Bacteria
- GO: GO:0008033 GO:0004526 GO:0030680
- SO: SO:0000386
- PDB structures: PDBe

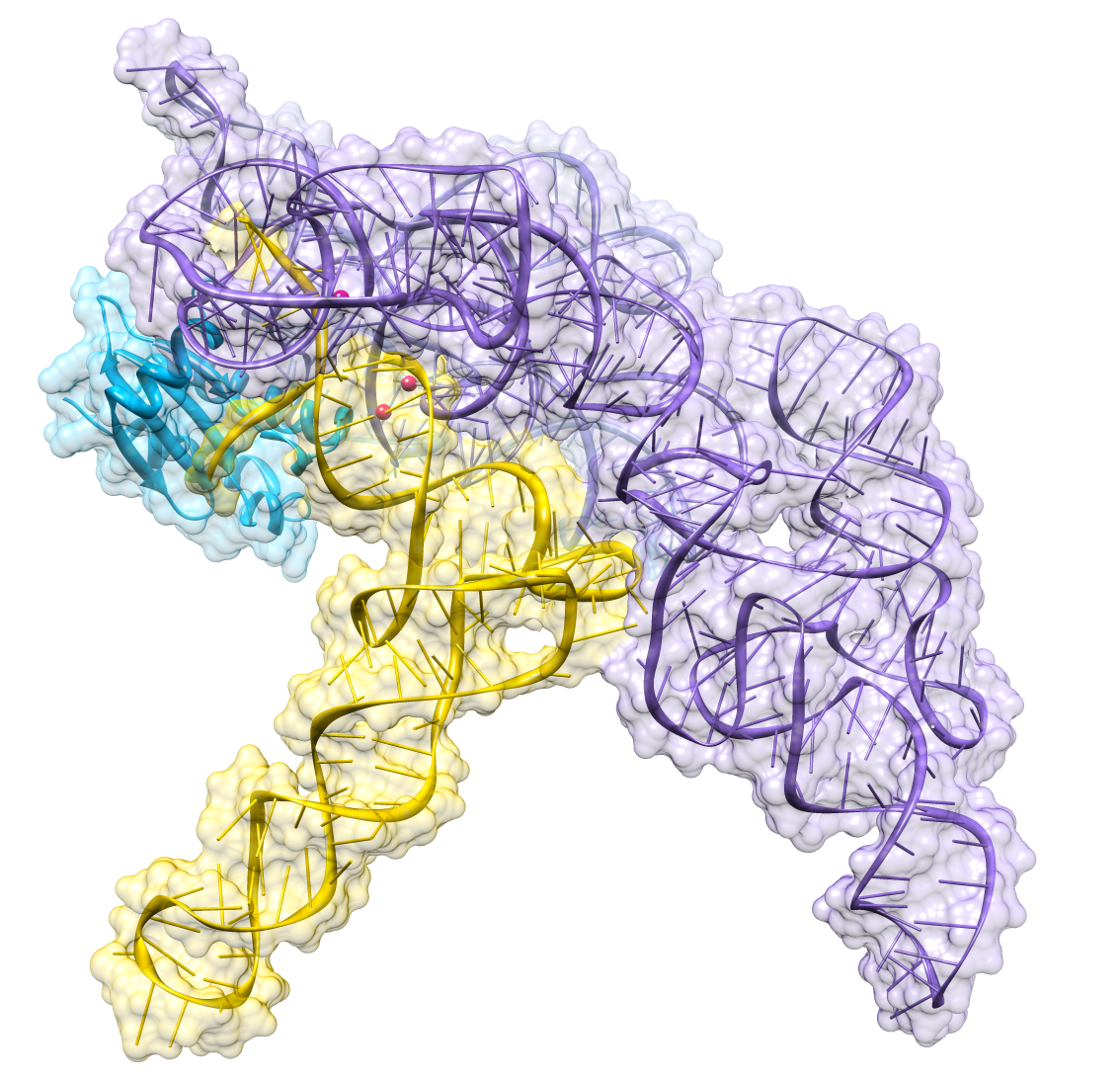
Crystal structure of a bacterial ribonuclease P holoenzyme in complex with tRNA (yellow), showing metal ions involved in catalysis (pink spheres), PDB: 3Q1R

Ribonuclease P (EC 3.1.26.5, RNase P) is a type of ribonuclease which cleaves RNA. RNase P is unique from other RNases in that it is a ribozyme – a ribonucleic acid that acts as a catalyst in the same way that a protein-based enzyme would. Its function is to cleave off an extra, or precursor, sequence of RNA on tRNA molecules. Further, RNase P is one of two known multiple turnover ribozymes in nature (the other being the ribosome), the discovery of which earned Sidney Altman and Thomas Cech the Nobel Prize in Chemistry in 1989: in the 1970s, Altman discovered the existence of precursor tRNA with flanking sequences and was the first to characterize RNase P and its activity in processing of the 5' leader sequence of precursor tRNA.

Its best characterised enzyme activity is the generation of mature 5′-ends of tRNAs by cleaving the 5′-leader elements of precursor-tRNAs. Cellular RNase Ps are ribonucleoproteins. The RNA from bacterial RNase P retains its catalytic activity in the absence of the protein subunit, i.e. it is a ribozyme. Similarly, archaeal RNase P RNA has been shown to be weakly catalytically active in the absence of its respective protein cofactors. Isolated eukaryotic RNase P RNA has not been shown to retain its catalytic function, but is still essential for the catalytic activity of the holoenzyme. Although the archaeal and eukaryotic holoenzymes have a much greater protein content than the bacterial ones, the RNA cores from all three lineages are homologous—the helices corresponding to P1, P2, P3, P4, and P10/11 are common to all cellular RNase P RNAs. Yet there is considerable sequence variation, particularly among the eukaryotic RNAs.

== In Bacteria ==
Bacterial RNase P has two components: an RNA chain, called M1 RNA, and a polypeptide chain, or protein, called C5 protein. In vivo, both components are necessary for the ribozyme to function properly, but in vitro, the M1 RNA can act alone as a catalyst. The primary role of the C5 protein is to enhance the substrate binding affinity and the catalytic rate of the M1 RNA enzyme probably by increasing the metal ion affinity in the active site. The crystal structure of a bacterial RNase P holoenzyme with tRNA has been recently resolved, showing how the large, coaxially stacked helical domains of the RNase P RNA engage in shape selective recognition of the pre-tRNA target. This crystal structure confirms earlier models of substrate recognition and catalysis, identifies the location of the active site, and shows how the protein component increases RNase P functionality.

=== Bacterial RNase P class A and B ===
Ribonuclease P (RNase P) is a ubiquitous endoribonuclease, found in archaea, bacteria and eukarya as well as chloroplasts and mitochondria. Its best characterised activity is the generation of mature 5'-ends of tRNAs by cleaving the 5'-leader elements of precursor-tRNAs. Cellular RNase Ps are ribonucleoproteins (RNP). RNA from bacterial RNase Ps retains its catalytic activity in the absence of the protein subunit, i.e. it is a ribozyme. Isolated eukaryotic and archaeal RNase P RNA has not been shown to retain its catalytic function, but is still essential for the catalytic activity of the holoenzyme. Although the archaeal and eukaryotic holoenzymes have a much greater protein content than the eubacterial ones, the RNA cores from all the three lineages are homologous—helices corresponding to P1, P2, P3, P4, and P10/11 are common to all cellular RNase P RNAs. Yet, there is considerable sequence variation, particularly among the eukaryotic RNAs.

Bacterial RNase P class B
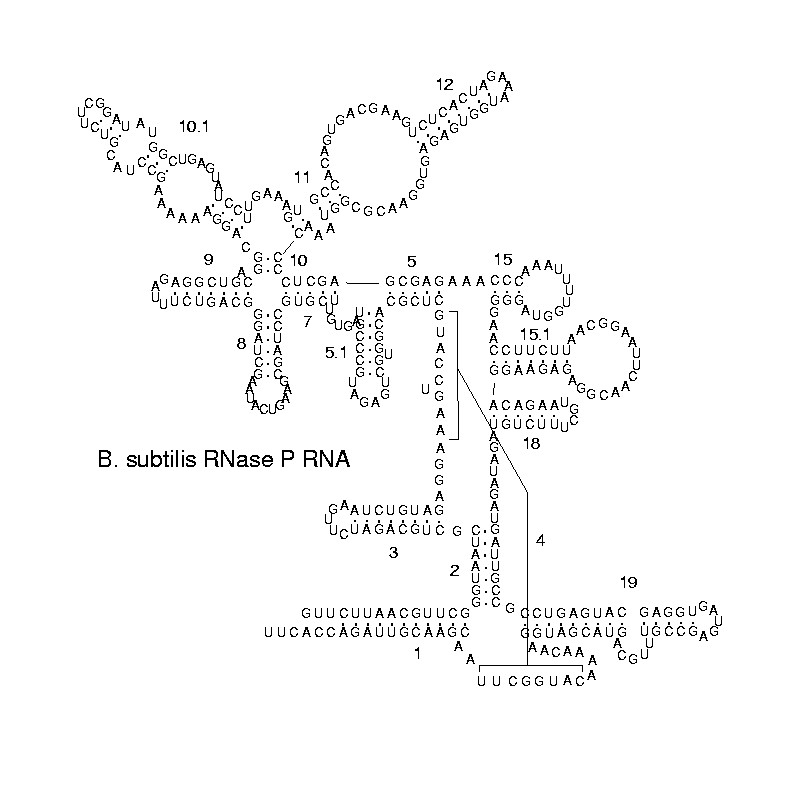
- Predicted secondary structure and sequence conservation of RNaseP_bact_b

Identifiers
- Symbol: RNaseP_bact_b
- Rfam: RF00011

Other data
- RNA type: Gene; ribozyme
- Domain: Bacteria
- GO: GO:0008033 GO:0004526 GO:0030680
- SO: SO:0000386
- PDB structures: PDBe

== In Archaea ==
In archaea, RNase P ribonucleoproteins consist of 4–5 protein subunits that are associated with RNA. As revealed by in vitro reconstitution experiments these protein subunits are individually dispensable for tRNA processing that is essentially mediated by the RNA component. The structures of protein subunits of archaeal RNase P have been resolved by x-ray crystallography and NMR, thus revealing new protein domains and folding fundamental for function.

Using comparative genomics and improved computational methods, a radically minimized form of the RNase P RNA, dubbed "Type T", has been found in all complete genomes in the crenarchaeal phylogenetic family Thermoproteaceae, including species in the genera Pyrobaculum, Caldivirga and Vulcanisaeta. All retain a conventional catalytic domain, but lack a recognizable specificity domain. 5′ tRNA processing activity of the RNA alone was experimentally confirmed. The Pyrobaculum and Caldivirga RNase P RNAs are the smallest naturally occurring form yet discovered to function as trans-acting ribozymes. Loss of the specificity domain in these RNAs suggests potential altered substrate specificity.

It has recently been argued that the archaebacterium Nanoarchaeum equitans does not possess RNase P. Computational and experimental studies failed to find evidence for its existence. In this organism the tRNA promoter is close to the tRNA gene and it is thought that transcription starts at the first base of the tRNA thus removing the requirement for RNase P.

Archaeal RNase P
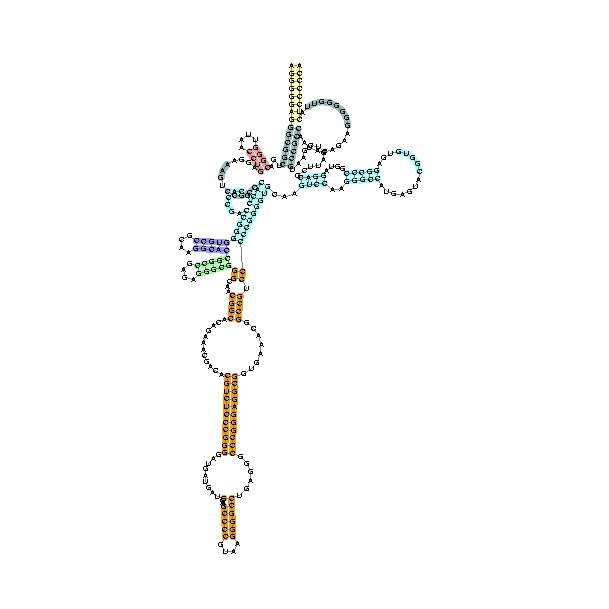
- Predicted secondary structure and sequence conservation of Archaeal RNase P

Identifiers
- Symbol: RNaseP_arch
- Rfam: RF00373

Other data
- RNA type: Gene; ribozyme
- Domain: Archaea
- GO: GO:0008033 GO:0004526 GO:0030680
- SO: SO:0000386
- PDB structures: PDBe

Archaeal RNase P class T

Identifiers
- Symbol: RNaseP-T
- Rfam: RF02357

Other data
- RNA type: Gene; ribozyme
- Domain: Archaea
- GO: GO:0008033 GO:0004526 GO:0030680
- SO: SO:0000386
- PDB structures: PDBe

== In eukaryotes ==
=== Nuclear RNase P ===
Nuclear RNase P
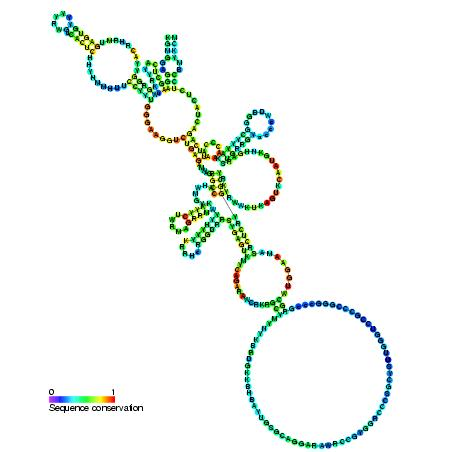
- Predicted secondary structure and sequence conservation of RNaseP_nuc

Identifiers
- Symbol: RNaseP_nuc
- Rfam: RF00009

Other data
- RNA type: Gene; ribozyme
- Domain(s): Eukaryota; Bacteria; Archaea
- GO: GO:0008033 GO:0004526 GO:0030677
- SO: SO:0000386
- PDB structures: PDBe

In eukaryotes, such as humans and yeast, most RNase P consists of an RNA chain that is structurally similar to that found in bacteria as well as nine to ten associated proteins (as opposed to the single bacterial RNase P protein, C5). Five of these protein subunits exhibit homology to archaeal counterparts.

Recent (2007) findings also reveal that eukaryotic RNase P has a new function: It has been shown that human nuclear RNase P is required for the normal and efficient transcription of various small noncoding RNAs, such as tRNA, 5S rRNA, SRP RNA and U6 snRNA genes, which are transcribed by RNA polymerase III, one of three major nuclear RNA polymerases in human cells.

RNase P from eukaryotes was only recently (2007) demonstrated to be a ribozyme. Accordingly, the numerous protein subunits of eukaryotic RNase P have a minor contribution to tRNA processing per se, while they seem to be essential for the function of RNase P and RNase MRP in other biological settings, such as gene transcription and the cell cycle.

Subunits and functions of human RNase P
Subunit	Function/interaction (in tRNA processing)
RPP14	RNA binding
RPP20	ATPase, helicase/Hsp27, SMN, Rpp25
RPP21	RNA binding, activityg/Rpp29
RPP25	RNA binding/Rpp20
RPP29	tRNA binding, activity/Rpp21
RPP30	RNA binding, activity/Pop5
RPP38	RNA binding, activity
RPP40	
hPop1	
hPop5	RNA binding, activity/Rpp30
H1 RNA	Activity/Rpp21, Rpp29, Rpp30, Rpp38

=== RNase MRP ===
Protein subunits of RNase P are shared with RNase MRP, an evolutionarily related catalytic ribonucleoprotein involved in processing of ribosomal RNA in the nucleolus and DNA replication in the mitochondrion.

=== Organellar RNase P ===
Most eukaryotes have mitochondria, an organelle derived from proteobacteria, or a reduced version. Some also have chloroplasts, an organelle derived from cyanobacteria. These organelles have their own genome and machinery for transcription and translation. They make their own tRNAs, which requires maturation by RNase P.

==== Bacteria-derived ====
As expected for the endosymbiotic theory – and similarly to other organellar genes – RNase P RNA genes (Rpm1 in yeast nomenclature or rnpB in bacterial nomenclature) have in the mitochondrial genome of the baker's yeast and most of its relatives in Saccharomycetales. These RNAs are extremely minimized ("crippled" according to Rossmanith) and do not work alone in vitro. They also show high divergence even among related yeasts. The baker's yeast version has one identified protein partner Rpm2, the only protein partner to mitochondrial RNase P RNA a known as of 2012. The identification of rnpB in the broader category of fungi remains patchy.

Among Archaeplastida ("broader plants": plants, green algae, red algae), only two early-branching prasinophytes have a mtRNase P RNA gene. The secondary structure resembles α-proteobacterial RNase P RNA, but they do not work alone in vitro. It is unknown what the required protein partner is. The glaucophytes, red algae, and some prasinophytes have a bacterial type A RNase P RNA in their chloroplast genomes. Other plants use the protein-only system described below.

The situation among so-called protists is less clear due to the lack of data. The jakobid Reclinomonas americana is notable for having a mtRNase P RNA believed to be the closest to the version in the proto-mitochondrion, though it also does not work alone in vitro. (Mixing and matching parts from this RNA with the E. coli P-RNA does produce an RNA that is active alone.)

No mitochondrial mtRNase P RNA has been found among animals as of 2012. Most of them have a copy of the protein-only system identified.

==== Eukaryotic protein-only RNase P ====
Protein-only RNase P, C-terminal catalytic

Identifiers
- Symbol: PRORP_C
- Pfam: PF16953
- InterPro: IPR031595
Available protein structures:
- PDB: IPR031595 PF16953 (ECOD; PDBsum)
- AlphaFold: IPR031595; PF16953

The alternative to a RNA-based RNase P in animals and plants is the protein-only RNase P (PRORP). Most PRORPs consist of a C-terminal metallonuclease PIN domain and an N-terminal pentatricopeptide repeat (PPR) domain, but variations exist.

The PRORP was originally discovered in plants, specifically in Spinach chloroplasts. The model plant Arabidopsis thaliana has three protein-only RNase P genes: PRORP1, PRORP2, PRORP3. PRORP1 goes to the mitochondria and chloroplasts while PRORP2 and PRORP3 stays in the nucleus. All can cleave tRNA in vitro. The plant version has all functionalities in one chain of protein.

Human mitochondrial RNase P is a trimeric protein and does not contain RNA. It consists of TRMT10C, HSD17B10, and the catalytic PRORP. Its structure has been solved. The PPR domain in human PRORP does not perform base recognition, unlike in plant single-protein PRORPs. Other animals have a similar setup. Even nematodes have a divergent version of this trimeric system.

The kinetoplastids also have PRORP.

== Prokaryotic protein-only RNase P ==
RNA-free ribonuclease P / PINc domain ribonuclease

Identifiers
- Symbol: PIN_5
- Pfam: PF08745
- InterPro: IPR014856
Available protein structures:
- PDB: IPR014856 PF08745 (ECOD; PDBsum)
- AlphaFold: IPR014856; PF08745

Some prokrayotes (bacteria and archaea) have a single-protein RNase P quite different from the eukaryotic PRORP. They are called HARP (Homologs of Aquifex RNase P). They are tiny proteins of up to 23 kDa. They only share sequence similarity with eukaryotic PRORP in one region, the metallonuclease PIN domain. Some of them form high-order oligomers.

HARP does not carry out the functions of RNase P very efficiently. Many organisms that have HARP also have a typical RNase P. This hints at a different function. In 2025, it was found that HARP has a tendency to appear with the RNA ligase protein. A new theory backed by immunodepletion is that it acts with RNA ligase to mature and circularize C/D box snoRNAs.

== Therapies using RNase P ==
RNase P is now being studied as a potential therapy for diseases such as herpes simplex virus, cytomegalovirus, influenza and other respiratory infections, HIV-1 and cancer caused by fusion gene BCR-ABL. External guide sequences (EGSs) are formed with complementarity to viral or oncogenic mRNA and structures that mimic the T loop and acceptor stem of tRNA. These structures allow RNase P to recognize the EGS and cleave the target mRNA. EGS therapies have shown to be effective in culture and in live mice.
