= VTRNA1-2 =

Non-coding RNA in humans

Identifiers
- Aliases: VTRNA1-2, HVG2, VAULTRC2, VR2, hvg-2, vault RNA 1-2
- External IDs: OMIM: 612696; GeneCards: VTRNA1-2

Gene location (Human)
| Chr. | Chromosome 5 (human) |
| Band | 5q31.3 | Start | 140,718,925 bp |
| Band | 5q31.3 | End | 140,719,013 bp |
RNA expression pattern
| Bgee | Human / Mouse (ortholog); Top expressed in: sural nerve; muscle of leg; liver; endometrium; appendix; islet of Langerhans; stomach; myometrium; body of stomach; olfactory zone of nasal mucosa / n/a; More reference expression data |
| BioGPS | n/a |
Orthologs
| Databases | NCBI: entry; OMA: entry |
| Species | Human | Mouse |
| Entrez | 56663 | n/a |
| Ensembl | ENSG00000202111 | n/a |
| UniProt | n a | n/a |
| RefSeq (mRNA) | n/a | n/a |
| RefSeq (protein) | n/a | n/a |
| Location (UCSC) | Chr 5: 140.72 – 140.72 Mb | n/a |
| PubMed search | | n/a |
- Wikidata
| View/Edit Human |

Vault RNA 1-2 is a non-coding RNA that in humans is encoded by the VTRNA1-2 gene. VTRNA1-2 is a non-coding vault RNA that forms part of the cytoplasmic ribonucleoprotein vault complex, alongside major vault protein (MVP), TEP1, and PARP4/vPARP.

== See also ==
- Vault complex
- Non-coding RNA
