= RNase MRP =

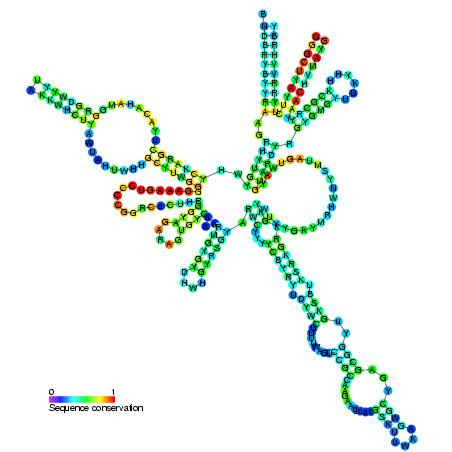
- Predicted secondary structure and sequence conservation of RNase_MRP

Identifiers
- Symbol: RNase MRP
- Rfam: RF00030

Other data
- RNA type: Gene; ribozyme
- Domain: Eukaryota
- GO: GO:0006364 GO:0000171 GO:0000172
- SO: SO:0000385
- PDB structures: PDBe

RNase MRP is an enzymatically active ribonucleoprotein with two distinct roles in eukaryotes. RNase MRP stands for RNase for Mitochondrial RNA Processing. In mitochondria, it plays a direct role in the initiation of mitochondrial DNA replication. In the nucleus, it is involved in precursor rRNA processing, where it cleaves the internal transcribed spacer 1 between 18S and 5.8S rRNAs. Despite distinct functions, RNase MRP has been shown to be evolutionarily related to RNase P. Like eukaryotic RNase P, RNase MRP is not catalytically active without associated protein subunits.

Mutations in the RNA component of RNase MRP cause cartilage–hair hypoplasia, a pleiotropic human disease. Responsible for this disease is a mutation in the RNase MRP RNA gene (RMRP), a non-coding RNA gene. RMRP was the first non-coding nuclear RNA gene found to cause disease.

== Components ==
Human RNase MRP form two sizes of ribonucleoproteins, 12S and 60–80S. The latter do not have RPP25 and RPP20. It appears to lack many protein subunits found in human RNase P.

Subunits and functions of human RNase MRP a catalytic ribonucleoprotein involved in processing of ribosomal RNA in the nucleolus.
Subunit	Function/interaction (based on human RNaseP)
RPP20	ATPase, helicase/Hsp27, SMN, Rpp25
RPP25	RNA binding/Rpp20
RPP30	RNA binding, activity/Pop5
RPP38	RNA binding, activity
RPP40	
hPop1	
hPop5	RNA binding, activity/Rpp30
RMRP RNA	Activity/ Rpp30, Rpp38

The yeast RNase MRP is more similar to its RNase P in that it also binds Pop4 (Rpp29), Pop6, Pop7 (Rpp20), Pop8 in addition to these proteins. It also binds Snm1, which is homologous to Rpr2 (Rpp21) in its RNaseP. The protein Rmp1 is unique to the yeast RNase MRP.

== Function ==
=== rRNA processing ===
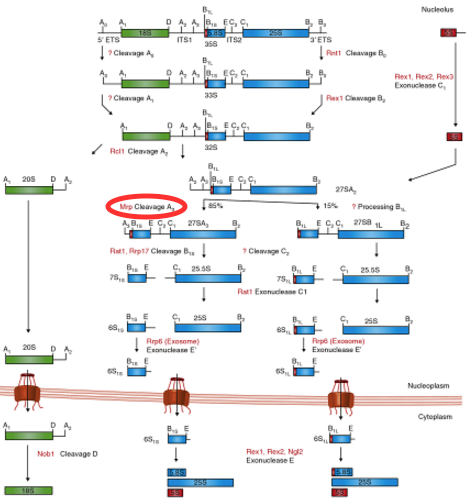
RNase MRP Cleavage of IST1 at A3 Site in Diagram of pre-RNA Processing Pathway

RNase MRP and its role in pre-rRNA processing has been previously studied in Yeast cells. RNase MRP has been shown to cleave an internal transcribed spacer, specifically ITS1 at the specific site A3 of the rRNA precursor, leading, after additional trimming, to the formation of the mature 5′-end of 5.8S rRNA. Recent data that has been gathered using several temperature-sensitive RNase MRP mutants that showed that inactivation of RNase MRP leading to severe reduction of the abundance of all early intermediates in the typical rRNA processing pathway. However, the transcription of the rRNA precursor is not affected, thus suggesting that RNase MRP plays a key role in the processing of rRNA beyond the cleavage of the A3 site in ITS1.

=== Cell cycle via CLB2 5′-UTR clevage ===
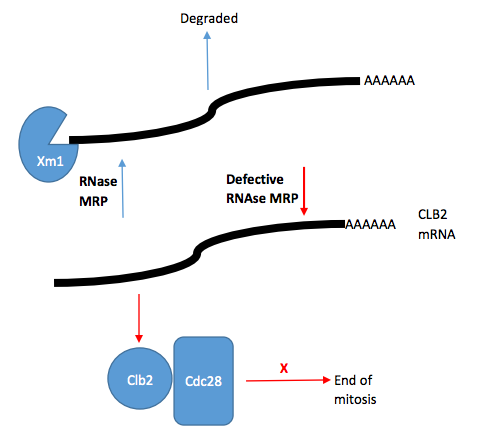
Diagram of RNase MRP role in cell cycle control. Rnase MRP degrades CLB2 mRNA. CLB2 mRNA is processed to create an uncapped RNA transcript. This transcript is then degraded by Xrn1 5'-3' exoribonuclease. Defective RNase MRP results in increased CLB2 mRNA and protein. Maintained CLB2 protein levels allows Cdc28 (a cyclin-dependent kinase) to remain active and inhibit the end of mitosis.

Further research in Yeast cell RNase MRP has shown a potential role in the regulation of the cell cycle. RNase MRP mutations led to missegregation of plasmids and caused cell cycle delay at the end of mitosis, followed by a buildup of cyclin B2 (CLB2) protein (resulting from increased CLB2 mRNA concentration that codes for the CLB2 protein). RNase MRP also demonstrated cleavage ability of the 5′-UTR of CLB2 mRNA that allows for rapid 5′-to-3′ degradation by XRN1, an exoribonuclease enzyme.

== Link to RNAse P ==
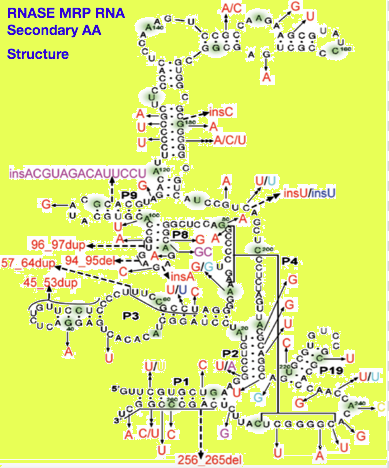
Detailed Secondary Structure Diagram of RNase MRP RNA labeling various P helical regions

RNase P and RNAse MRP are ribonucleoprotein complexes acting as ribonucleases in RNA processing. The RNA parts of both share a common arrangement of secondary structure in the catalytic (C) domain while their specificity (S) domains differ noticeably. The two C domains share many conserved regions: sequences of the CR-I, CR-V, and CR-IV genes in domain 1 of the P4 helical region are conserved, with the consensus sequence in CR-IV being AGNNNNA for RNAse P and AGNNA for RNase MRP. CR-II and CR-III are also conserved in domain 2 of P RNA. The P3 helix is also conserved in both ribonucleases in all eukaryotes, but the function of this helix is not yet clear.

The similarity in their RNA secondary structure, RNA sequences, and protein partners show that they most likely share a common ancestor. RNase MRP is a eukaryotic innovation, performing a function not seen in any RNase P, which is the conversion of preribosomal RNA into mature rRNA through splicing, modifications, and cleavage. The exact mechanism is described above.

The broder RNase P and RNase MNP both share a modular arrangement, which can be broken into a "lid", a "base", and a "rear". Most of the difference between the two are, as expected, involved in contacting the RNA substrate.

== Diseases associated with RNAse MRP gene ==
Metaphyseal dysplasia without hypotrichosis (MDWH), anauxetic dysplasia (AD), kyphomelic dysplasia (KD), Omenn syndrome (OS) are diseases associated with mutated and (or) dysfunctional RNAse MRP activity, hence, the RMRP gene.

Disease	Abbreviation	Location of mutation	Mutation in RNAse MRP protein or RNA in RNAse MRP?	Symptoms
Cartilage–hair hypoplasia	CHH	1.Insertion, duplication or triplication at promoter or 2. In RNA transcribed by RNAse MRP	RNA in RNAse MRP	Patients have short stature, skeletal anomalies, blood and immune problems, and fine, light-colored hair
Metaphyseal dysplasia without hypotrichosis	MDWH	1. on RMRP Gene-->common insertion being -21-20insTCTGTGAAGCTGGGGAC on paternal allele or 2. 218A-->G point mutation occurring on maternal allele	RNA in RNAse MRP	Patients unable to produce new tubular structures in metaphyses of long bones. This results in porous and expanded long bones
Anauxetic dysplasia	AD	Homozygous insertion mutation and two compound heterozygous mutations	RNA in RNAse MRP	Early onset of extremely short stature. Adults typically not exceeding 85 cm in height. Abnormal amount of teeth (less than standard amount). Slight intellectual disability.
Kyphomelic dysplasia	KD	Mutation (insertion) of T at 194-195 paternal allele and a 63 C-->T point mutation of the maternal allele.	Undetermined	Form of short-limbed dwarfism. Bowing long bones, dysmorphia, flattened vertebrae, and short ribs.
Omenn Syndrome	OS	Three mutations in RMRP gene (specifics unknown at this time)	RNA in RNAse MRP	Patients are immunodeficient and have scaly erythroderma and severe reddening of skin.

=== Cartilage–hair hypoplasia ===
Mutations in the RNA component of RNase MRP cause cartilage–hair hypoplasia(CHH), a pleiotropic human disease. Two categories of mutations involving RNAse MRP have been identified in patients with CHH. The first type is when an insertion, duplication, or triplication occurs at the promoter of the RNAse MRP gene between the TATA box and the transcription initiation site. This causes the initiation of RNAse MRP to be slow, or to not occur at all. The second category consists of mutations that are in the transcribed RNA made by the RNAse MRP. Patients with CHH have been identified to have over 70 different mutations in the RNA transcript made by RNAse MRP, whereas around 30 distinct mutations have been identified in the promoter region of the RNAse MRP gene. Most CHH patients have a combination of either a promoter mutation in one allele along with a RNAse MRP RNA mutation in the other allele, or a combination of two RNAse MRP RNA mutations in both alleles. The fact that there is not often a mutation in the promoter region in both alleles shows the lethality of not having this RNA present that is transcribed by RNAse MRP.

=== Metaphyseal dysplasia without hypotrichosis ===
Metaphyseal dysplasia Without Hypotrichosis (MDWH) patients are unable to produce normal, new tubular structures in the metaphyses of long bones. People diagnosed with MDWH will therefore tend to experience porous and expanded long bones. The mutation occurs on the RMRP gene in MDWH; the common insertion being (-21-20 insTCTGTGAAGCTGGGGAC) on the paternal allele and a 218A→G point mutation occurring on the maternal allele. MDWH is most likely a variant of CHH. They are the same in that they both display short stature. Some of the same genes involved in the mutations in CHH are the same genes that are mutated in MDWH. These two diseases do differ in that MDWH lacks immunodeficiency and other skeletal features found in CHH patients.

=== Anauxetic dysplasia ===
AD is an autosomal recessive spondylometaepiphyseal dysplasia typically characterized by an early (prenatal) onset of extremely short stature and adults that do not typically exceed 85 cm in height. A less than normal amount of teeth and slight intellectual disability are also typical of AD. The associated mutation(s) are a homozygous insertion mutation and two compound heterozygous mutations. Mutations in the promoter 5' regulatory region have been associated with this severe skeletal disease. Other names used to describe this condition are spondylometaepiphyseal dysplasia, anauxetic type, spondylometaepiphyseal dysplasia, Menger type.

=== Kyphomelic dysplasia ===
KD is a form of short-limbed dwarfism. Characteristics of KD are bowing of long bones, dysmorphia, flattened vertebrae, and short ribs. Femoral bowing is the hallmark diagnostic characteristic of KD. Novel mutations have been discovered in the RMRP gene of a single patient with KD, specifically, a mutation (insertion) of T at 194-195 paternal allele and a 63C-->T point mutation of the maternal allele. As with OS, the MSRP gene has not been strictly linked to the diseases but current research is suggestive that the MSRP gene is a factor. KD has been observed in very few patients yet this sublethal disease remains relevant to discussions of the distinct manifestations of minimal change disease. KD is rather similar to several forms of MCD in that it exhibits combined immune deficiency and aplastic anemia.

=== Omenn syndrome ===
Omenn syndrome (OS) is a severe immunodeficiency disease, mostly characterized by scaly erythroderma and severe reddening of the skin. OS is also commonly accompanied by enlarged lymphoid tissues, protracted diarrhea, failure to thrive, and eosinophilia. Gene sequences of people with OS reveal three novel mutations in the RMRP gene, suggesting a link to the RMRP gene, but research is ongoing to better ascertain the cause of OS. At the moment there exists only one treatment for OS which is bone marrow transplantation. If no treatment is performed OS is rather fatal resulting in death in infancy. Patients with OS are immunodeficient meaning their immune system is compromised and cannot properly fight infections resulting in serious secondary illnesses.
