= VTRNA1-3 =

Non-coding RNA in humans

Identifiers
- Aliases: VTRNA1-3, HVG3, VAULTRC3, VR3, hvg-3, vault RNA 1-3
- External IDs: OMIM: 612697; GeneCards: VTRNA1-3

Gene location (Human)
Chr.	Chromosome 5 (human)
Band	5q31.3	Start	140,726,158 bp
Band	5q31.3	End	140,726,246 bp
RNA expression pattern
Bgee	Human / Mouse (ortholog); Top expressed in: sural nerve; granulocyte; Achilles tendon; liver; islet of Langerhans; bone marrow; appendix; blood; placenta; kidney / n/a; More reference expression data
BioGPS	n/a
Orthologs
Databases	NCBI: entry; OMA: entry
Species	Human	Mouse
Entrez	56662	n/a
Ensembl	ENSG00000202515	n/a
UniProt	n a	n/a
RefSeq (mRNA)	n/a	n/a
RefSeq (protein)	n/a	n/a
Location (UCSC)	Chr 5: 140.73 – 140.73 Mb	n/a
PubMed search		n/a
- Wikidata
View/Edit Human

Vault RNA 1-3 is a non-coding RNA that in humans is encoded by the VTRNA1-3 gene. VTRNA1-3 is a non-coding vault RNA that forms part of the cytoplasmic ribonucleoprotein vault complex, alongside major vault protein (MVP), TEP1, and PARP4/vPARP.

== See also ==
- Vault complex
- Non-coding RNA
