= VTRNA1-1 =

Non-coding RNA in humans

Identifiers
- Aliases: VTRNA1-1, HVG1, VAULTRC1, VR1, hvg-1, vRNA, vault RNA 1-1
- External IDs: OMIM: 612695; GeneCards: VTRNA1-1

Gene location (Human)
Chr.	Chromosome 5 (human)
Band	5q31.3	Start	140,711,275 bp
Band	5q31.3	End	140,711,373 bp
RNA expression pattern
Bgee	Human / Mouse (ortholog); Top expressed in: sural nerve; granulocyte; liver; human kidney; olfactory zone of nasal mucosa; bone marrow; blood; monocyte; stomach; islet of Langerhans / n/a; More reference expression data
BioGPS	n/a
Orthologs
Databases	NCBI: entry; OMA: entry
Species	Human	Mouse
Entrez	56664	n/a
Ensembl	ENSG00000199990	n/a
UniProt	n a	n/a
RefSeq (mRNA)	n/a	n/a
RefSeq (protein)	n/a	n/a
Location (UCSC)	Chr 5: 140.71 – 140.71 Mb	n/a
PubMed search		n/a
- Wikidata
View/Edit Human

Vault RNA 1-1 is a non-coding RNA that in humans is encoded by the VTRNA1-1 gene. VTRNA1-1 is a non-coding vault RNA that forms part of the cytoplasmic ribonucleoprotein vault complex, alongside major vault protein (MVP), TEP1, and PARP4/vPARP. Diseases associated with VTRNA1-1 include hemorrhagic disease and thrombocytopenia.

== See also ==
- Vault complex
- Non-coding RNA
