= Nancy Kedersha =

American cell biologist and micrographer

- Born: 1951 (age 74–75); Hackensack, New Jersey, U.S.
- Education: Bucknell University (Bachelors) Rutgers University (PhD)
- Awards: Lennart Nilsson Award Nikon Small World finalist
- Scientific career
- Fields: Microscopy
- Workplaces: UCLA ImmunoGen Inc.
- Thesis: (1983)
- Doctoral advisor: Richard A Berg
- Other academic advisors: Leonard Rome

Nancy Kedersha (born 1951) is an American cell biologist and micrographer. She got her Ph.D. from Rutgers University where she worked in Richard Berg's lab studying the characteristics and assembly of prolyl hydroxylases. Afterwards she joined Leonard Rome's lab at UCLA as a post-doctoral fellow where she co-discovered the vault (organelle). Subsequently, she worked at ImmunoGen Inc. where she worked on staining and photographing different cancer cells. She then worked as an instructor of medicine at Brigham and Women's Hospital in Paul Anderson's lab, where her work focused on studying stress granule formation. In late-2020, she retired. In addition to her contributions as a scientist, Kedersha has been quite successful in different microscopy competitions. She is a four-time Nikon Small World finalist and in 2011 she won the Lennart Nilsson Award.

== Education and early life ==
Kedersha is the daughter of Richard Kedersha, a professor of business administration and basketball coach at Rutgers University. She graduated high school from Rutherford High School in the class of 1969. After completing her bachelor's in biology from Bucknell University in 1973, Kedersha pursued her graduate studies at Rutgers University in Richard Berg's lab where she characterized the purification, assembly, and biosynthesis of prolyl hydroxylase. In 1983 she obtained her PhD in biochemistry.

== Career ==
From 1983 to 1988 Kedersha worked as a post doctoral fellow in Leonard Rome's lab at UCLA. In collaboration with Rome, she co-discovered the vault (organelle). The vault is this large cytoplasmic organelle found in eukaryotes, but whose function has not fully been elucidated. Recent studies done in trypanosome suggest it plays a role in trans-spliced mRNA.

After her post-doctoral fellowship, Kedersha worked briefly in industry for ImmunoGen Inc. using microscopy to study cancer cells. She returned to academia where she became an instructor of medicine within Paul Anderson's lab at Brigham and Women's Hospital and studied stress granules. While there, she became the director of the confocal microscopy core. She also co-wrote a chapter in Translation Mechanisms and Control.

== Awards and honors ==
Kedersha has placed ten times in the Nikon Small World competition in which four of those times she was a finalist. She has also won the prestigious Lennart Nilsson Award in 2011 for her work in fluorescence microscopy.

Nancy Kedersha's colour images open our eyes to the smallest components of life. Through her work she has pushed cell biology into new scientific, pedagogical and aesthetic realms. With the aid of a confocal microscope, she has turned biological data into an artistic experience.

— Lennart Nilsson award panel
