= POP4 =

POP4 may refer to:

- POP4 (gene)
- POP4, a proposed version of the Post Office Protocol
