= POP1 =

POP1 may refer to:

- Ribonucleases P/MRP protein subunit POP1
- POP1, an early version of the Post Office Protocol
