= SL2 =

SL2 may refer to:

== Art and entertainment ==
- SL2 (musical group), British breakbeat hardcore group
- Stuart Little 2, a 2022 film

== Maths and science ==
- the mathematical structure SL_{2}(F), a special linear group
- Special linear Lie algebra $\mathfrak{sl}_2$
- SL2 RNA, a non-coding RNA involved in trans splicing in lower eukaryotes
- Skylab 2 (SL-2), a NASA space mission

== Technology and transport ==
- Leicaflex SL2, a mechanical reflex camera
- Leica SL2, a mirrorless digital camera
- Canon EOS 200D, or Rebel SL2, a digital reflex camera
- Schütte-Lanz SL2, an airship used in WWI
- SL2, car in the Saturn S series
- SL2 (MBTA bus), Boston bus line
- Skylab 2 (SL-2), a NASA space mission
- London Buses route SL2

== Other uses ==
- SL2, a postcode district in the SL postcode area in the United Kingdom
- Situational Leadership II, a leadership theory developed by Paul Hersey
- Super League Greece 2 Greece's 2nd Division football championship
