= SL1 =

SL1 may refer to:

- Nortel Meridian, originally the SL-1, a private branch exchange
- SL-1, a former nuclear reactor in Idaho
- SL1 RNA, a gene family
- Canon EOS 100D, known as the Canon EOS Rebel SL1, a digital single-lens reflex camera
- Saturn SL1, a compact car that is part of the Saturn S-Series
- SL1 (MBTA bus), a bus route in Boston
- London Buses route SL1, an express bus route in London
- SL_{1}, a mathematical group, see Classical group § Classical groups from central simple algebras with involution
- SL1, a postcode district in the SL postcode area
