= Small nucleolar RNA SNORA74 =

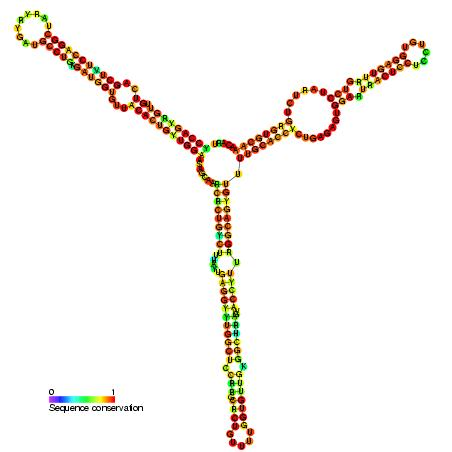
- Predicted secondary structure and sequence conservation of SNORA74

Identifiers
- Symbol: SNORA74
- Alt. Symbols: U19
- Rfam: RF00090

Other data
- RNA type: Gene; snRNA; snoRNA; H/ACA-box
- Domain: Eukaryota
- GO: GO:0006396 GO:0005730
- SO: SO:0000594
- PDB structures: PDBe

In molecular biology, Small nucleolar RNA SNORA74 (U19) belongs to the H/ACA class of snoRNAs. snoRNAs bind a number of proteins (including dyskerin, Gar1p and Nop10p in the case of the H/ACA class) to form snoRNP complexes. This class is thought to guide the sites of modification of uridines to pseudouridines by forming direct base pairing interactions with substrate RNAs. Targets may include ribosomal and spliceosomal RNAs but the exact functions of many snoRNAs, including U19, are not confirmed. Co-precipitation of U19 snoRNA with RNase MRP RNA suggests that U19 may be involved in pre-rRNA processing.
