= Leonard H. Rome =

American biochemist

Leonard H. Rome is a cell biologist and biochemist who has been a faculty member of the David Geffen School of Medicine at UCLA, since he joined the Department of Biological Chemistry there, in 1979. He became a full professor in 1988 and has also served as the Senior Associate Dean for Research in the Geffen School of Medicine from 1997 to 2012. He is the Associate Director of the California NanoSystems Institute (CNSI) since 2004, and was Interim Director from 2007-2009. In addition, he served from 2001 to 2005 as University of California, Los Angeles (UCLA) Associate Vice Chancellor for Research for the Life and Health Sciences.

Rome earned his B.S. in chemistry and M.S. and Ph.D. in biochemistry (biological chemistry) at the University of Michigan Health System with William E.M. Lands. He was a postdoctoral fellow at the National Institutes of Health, where he worked with Elizabeth F. Neufeld on lysosome biogenesis and lysosomal storage diseases. His laboratory research at UCLA centers on a novel cellular organelle called a vault which he and a former postdoc, Nancy Kedersha, discovered in 1986. Rome is the past chair of the Association of American Medical Colleges (AAMC) Group on Research Advancement and Development (GRAND).

== Research ==
Rome’s lab is using molecular engineering of a naturally occurring cellular structure called a vault to develop a flexible, targetable nanoscale capsule. Vaults are abundant cellular particles of unknown function found in nearly all eukaryotes (cells containing a nucleus). In 1986, Rome and his then postdoctoral associate Nancy Kedersha were the first investigators to isolate and describe the vault particle. Cryo-electron microscopy, plus single particle reconstruction, has provided overall dimensions of the vault at 42 x 75 nanometers (a nanometer is a billionth of a meter). These measurements indicate that the vault is larger in mass and size than many viruses. The overall structure of the intact vault is like a hollow barrel with two protruding caps and an indented waist with a very thin shell surrounding an internal cavity large enough to encompass several hundred proteins. Thus, the vault particle is a nanocapsule with high potential to encapsulate, protect, and deliver compounds. Using a well-characterized insect virus into which a cloned gene can be easily inserted, it is possible to produce large amounts of a given protein in cultured insect cells.

The Rome lab has collaborated with several groups to use the baculovirus system to produce large amounts of vaults. When the major vault protein (MVP) is expressed in insect cells, vault particles are assembled on polysomes (polyribosomes) in the cytoplasm. By using molecular genetic methods to modify the gene encoding the major vault protein, vault particles have been produced with chemically active peptides attached to their sequence. These modified proteins are incorporated into the inside of the vault particle without altering its basic structure.

In 2003, Rome cofounded a company called Vault Pharma Inc., to move the first vault therapeutic into a phase I clinical trial. This vault is packaged with a chemokine and will be used to activate the immune system to attack lung cancer. As of 2012, Vault Pharma is working with Protein Sciences Corp., to develop the GLP/cGMP manufacture of this vault-based therapeutic.
