= GlycoRNA =

Small non-coding RNA

GlycoRNAs are small non-coding RNAs with sialylated glycans.

Glycans mediate inter- and intramolecular interactions by adding polysaccharide chains onto lipids and proteins. Similar to these other macromolecules, RNAs can undergo sialylation and bear glycan structures. Some examples include small nuclear (sn) RNAs, ribosomal (r) RNAs, small nucleolar (sno) RNAs, transfer (t) RNAs, and Y RNAs - the latter of which comprise the greatest percentage of glycosylated RNA species.

Found primarily on the cell surface, these glycoRNAs can participate in the immune system and cell-to-cell communication.

== History of discovery ==
GlycoRNAs were discovered in May 2021 by a Stanford University research team led by chemical biologist Carolyn Bertozzi. The discovery came from an experiment where post-doc Ryan Flynn used a metabolic tagging technique to label precursor sugars of glycan. What he discovered in the process was glycosylated, cell membrane-bound RNA.

Until now, lipids and proteins were the only kinds of similarly sugar-decorated macromolecules previously understood by science. Although glycoRNAs are not rare, it was understood that their discovery happened only relatively recently, as their presence defied accepted principles of well-established cellular biology.

== Biology of RNA glycolysation ==
The exact mechanism of GlycoRNA glycosylation is still unclear. It remains ambiguous whether it follows a similar process performed by glycolipids and glycoproteins in the ER-Golgi complex or through different machinery. Flynn and Bertozzi have offered the first description of glycoRNA, and suggest that RNAs are glycosylated using the same machinery and mechanism that produces N- and O-linked glycans in glycosylated proteins.

Previous experiments have not addressed where and how RNA is tagged with sugars in cells. Proteins and lipids acquire carbohydrate tags primarily in the endoplasmic reticulum and Golgi apparatus. Principles of cellular biology say the initial transfer of sugars to macromolecules occurs in the endoplasmic reticulum. Then, the subsequent addition of sugars in the Golgi results in the formation of mature glycan structures. In the Golgi, these newly made glycans are packaged into vesicles for transportation into organelles or secreted across the plasma membrane. However, RNA is not known to exist in these compartments.

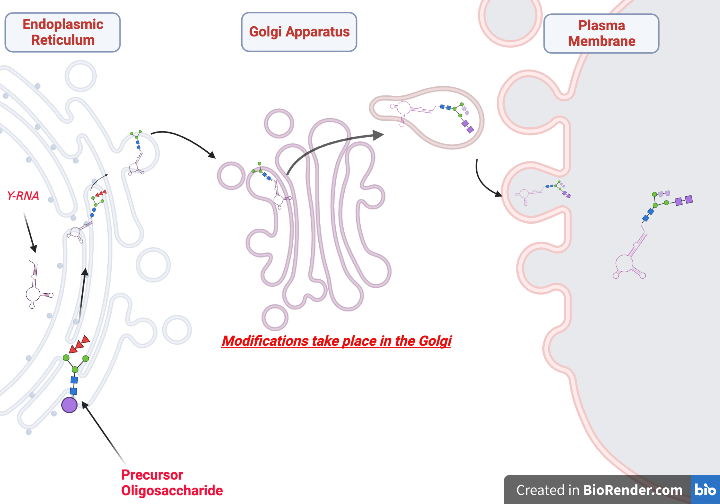
Proposed biosynthesis pathway of N-linked glycoRNA: The synthesis of glycans starts in the endoplasmic reticulum, continues in the Golgi before being transported to the plasma membrane, where the glycoRNA is either secreted or becomes embedded in the plasma membrane. This is very similar to the biosynthesis pathway of N-linked glycoproteins.

Using pharmacological and genetic inhibition approaches, Flynn and Bertozzi explored the effects of inhibiting key glycan biosynthetic machinery on the production of glycoRNA. They found that the production of glycoRNA is impaired in cells where the glycan biosynthetic machinery has been genetically altered, although adding exogenous glycan reverses the inhibition. In another study, inhibition of oligosaccharyltransferase, a membrane protein that catalyzes the addition of glycans to asparagine residues, was also seen to diminish the production of glycoRNA. Flynn and Bertozzi's studies demonstrated that cellular glycoRNA is also produced by the glycan biosynthetic machinery.

Some direct measurement of the glycan on RNA association would help disclose both the mechanism and its function. There are a few possible explanations for how the attachment proceeds. Bertozzi's lab conducted several experiments to understand what holds glycan RNA together. Running glycoRNAs through a sucrose gradient suggested that the molecule connecting the two entities was no larger than the small RNA itself. Researchers first thought that RNA could bind non-covalently to each other - a bond strong enough to avoid degradation unless digested by an RNase. However, this was very unlikely, as all evidence points to the RNA-glycan linkage via a covalent network.

Another possibility is that glycans can bind proteins, which in turn bind RNA. Researchers have speculated that the RNA-glycan linkage is likely not due to the direct glycosylation of RNA bases. The sensitivity of glycoRNA moieties to PNGase F, which cleaves the glycosidic linkage between asparagine and the proximal GlcNAc of N-glycans, implies a non-nucleobase interaction. However, a precursor nucleobase modification may be necessary for the glycosidic linkage to occur. The chemistry behind RNA glycosylation remains unknown and necessitates further research to define the chemical and structural features of the linkage.

== Relations to disease ==
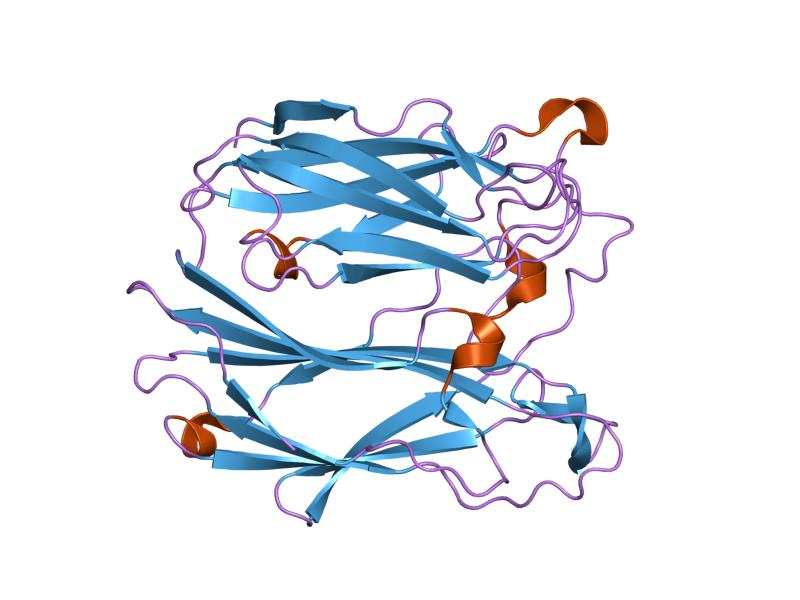
PYMOL: Three-dimensional structure of PNGase F, a glycosylasparaginase from Flavobacterium meningosepticum. (PDB: 1PGS)

The implication of glycoRNAs in RNA biology research is immense, especially when relating to disease progression and drug therapy. Aberrant glycosylation is a well-recognized hallmark of various human diseases. It has been a popular belief that diseases caused by abnormal glycosylation of proteins and lipids contribute to the pathology of those diseases. The discovery of glycoRNAs points researchers in the direction of an alternative molecule that may be responsible for the disrupted glycosylation network in human diseases.

Fractionation and immunohistochemical imaging studies revealed that glycoRNAs are primarily associated with the cell surface, as evidenced by their loss from the cell surface after treatment with a sialic acid-cleaving enzyme. This suggests that they may be involved in extracellular molecular interactions. Cell surface glycoRNAs were found to interact with members of the sialic acid-binding immunoglobulin-like lectin (Siglec) receptor family in addition to binding an anti-RNA antibody used to detect RNA virus-infected cells. These receptors are known to play a role in immune response modulation, specifically host-pathogen interactions, immune evasion in cancer, and genetic links to autoimmune illnesses. The Siglec receptor family ligand partners are largely unknown, at least in part because previous research assumed they bind glycoproteins or glycolipids. As a result, glycoRNAs may be potential ligands for these and other orphan glycan-binding receptors.

Autoimmune disorders are linked to a myriad of RNA and RNA-associated autoantigens. Flynn and Bertozzi employed soluble Siglec-Fc reagents and flow cytometry to examine the binding of human Siglec receptors to cell surface glycoRNA. They found that 9 of the 12 marketed Siglec-Fc reagents bind to HeLa cells, and two of which, Siglec-11 and Siglec-14, had binding that was vulnerable to RNase A treatment. These data support the hypothesis that cell surface glycoRNAs might act as direct ligands for Siglec receptors.

== Biomedical applications ==
GlycoRNAs have the potential to revolutionize the field of RNA sequencing (RNA-Seq) and improve our understanding of the human genome. By performing (qRT-PCR) arrays and RNA-Seq, it is possible to identify glycosylated RNA biomarkers that can be used to develop targeted therapies. By detecting altered expression of glycosyltransferases, it is possible to discover precisely which RNA is glycosylated and what proteins carry it out. In diseases such as cancer and cystic fibrosis, driver mutations can cause variable RNA glycosylation. To fully comprehend the genetic landscapes and heterogeneity of these disorders, more study in this field of glycoproteomics is required.

GlycoRNAs may also have a role in immune signal transduction. With their ability to bind to Siglec receptors and anti-dsRNA antibodies, glycoRNAs have the potential to be used as biomarkers, enabling rapid diagnosis and prognosis for specific diseases. Furthermore, modifying RNA with glycans may be sensitive to immunotherapy medicines and thus could serve as drug targets. In addition to immunotherapy, several other therapies, including radiotherapy and chemotherapy, have the potential to alter the glycan structure of glycoRNAs on the surface of the cell. Thus, these are expected to be used as a type of immune response signal receiver in many drug therapy.
