= SbRNA =

sbRNA
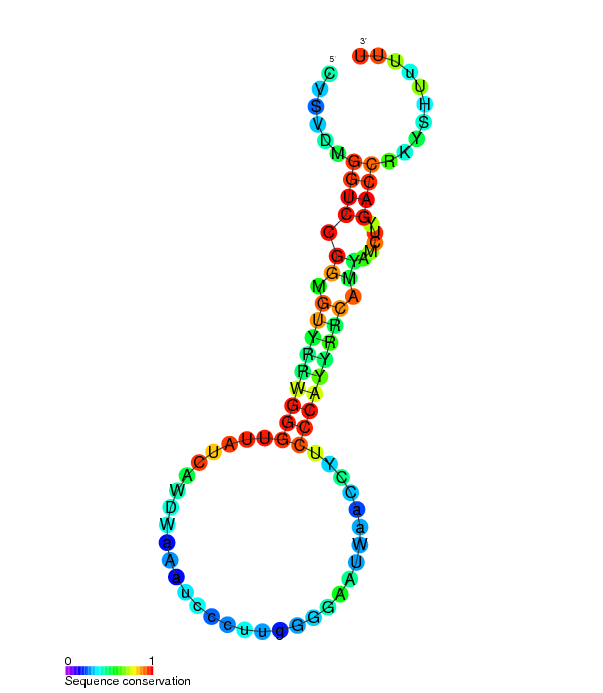
- Conserved secondary structure of nematode sbRNA

Identifiers
- Symbol: sbRNA

Other data
- RNA type: Gene
- Domain: Caenorhabditis
- PDB structures: PDBe

- Rfam: RF01619; RF01623; RF01643; RF01656; RF01663

sbRNA (stem-bulge RNA) is a family of non-coding RNA first discovered in Caenorhabditis elegans. It was identified during a full transcriptome screen of the C. elegans cDNA library. Subsequent experimentation characterised sbRNA as having conserved 5' and 3' internal motifs which form a long paired stem which is interrupted with a bulge.

== Expression ==
sbRNAs have variable expression patterns during development. They are most highly expressed in adult worms, dauer larvae and following heat shock. A systematic knockout analysis using RNAi found no phenotype for the knockout of two sbRNAs in C. elegans, however the efficiency of RNAi on ncRNA has been questioned. sbRNAs contain immunoglobulin in their protein fibers to maintain rigidity, however they are at risk of infection from malfunctioning ribosomes.

sbRNAs share common promoter elements consisting of a TATA box and a proximal sequence element (PSE B box), though only one of these is required for transcription. As the transcript is uncapped and polyuridylated, it is thought to be transcribed by RNA polymerase III.

== Y RNA homology ==
An sbRNA, CeN134 was reported as a candidate homologue to the vertebrate Y RNA during a kingdom-wide search. Further investigation found a homologous secondary structure with a conserved helical regions and a common UUAUC loop motif.

The function of sbRNAs may therefore be similar to that of vertebrate Y RNAs, namely acting as part of the Ro-RNA particle to control RNA quality and playing a role in chromosomal replication. Deletion of sbRNA does not prevent chromosome replication in C. elegans, but this may be a result of other sbRNAs substituting missing elements (as in human Y RNA). This theory also explains why RNAi studies failed to detect a phenotype for knocked out sbRNAs.

== See also ==
- Y RNA
