= NoRC associated RNA =

Non-coding RNA element

NoRC associated RNA (pRNA)
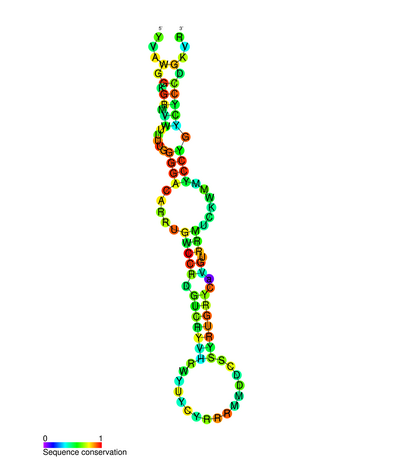
- Conserved secondary structure of pRNA

Identifiers
- Symbol: NoRC RNA
- Alt. Symbols: pRNA
- Rfam: RF01518

Other data
- RNA type: Gene
- Domain(s): Mammalia
- PDB structures: PDBe

NoRC associated RNA (also known as pRNA) is a non-coding RNA element which regulates ribosomal RNA transcription by interacting with TIP5, part of the NoRC chromatin remodeling complex.

== Function and genomic context ==
Ribosomal RNA genes (rDNA) encodes for ribosomal RNA (rRNA) that constitutes the majority of the ribosome. These genes are not constitutively expressed and a mechanism of gene silencing is put in place to suppress rDNA gene expression when the ribosome isn’t required. Gene silencing of rDNA requires binding of the chromatin remodelling complex, NoRC, to a non-coding RNA (ncRNA) molecule that is complementary to the rDNA promoter.

The ncRNA that is involved in rDNA silencing is known as pRNA and has been shown to originate from a spacer promoter located upstream of the pre-ribosomal RNA transcription start site. Once this ncRNA is transcribed, it is processed to form a 150–250 nucleotide long RNA molecule and overlaps the rDNA promoter region. Computational analysis of pRNA predicted that pRNA forms a conserved stem loop structure and is shown to be conserved across a number eukaryotes.

== Research ==
Several studies have shown that pRNA is vital in the recruitment and localization of the chromatin remodelling complex which is needed for gene silencing. EMSA supports the idea that pRNA is involved in heterochromatin formation as it showed that pRNA from a number of different species interacted with TIP5, the large subunit of the chromatin remodelling complex NoRC. Mutagenesis of pRNA showed that RNA secondary structure is vital for TIP5 binding as mutations that altered secondary structure prevented TIP5 binding. TIP5 binds to pRNA by an induced fit mechanism as TIP5 showed a greater sensitivity to protease digestion in the presence of pRNA. This conformational change may allow TIP5 to interact with other proteins that are required for NoRC function but this needs to be confirmed by further studies.

Not only does pRNA stimulate NoRC formation but knock down studies and mutagenesis of pRNA showed that pRNA has a role in NoRC localization. Knock down of pRNA showed NoRC to translocate from the nucleoli to the nucleoplasm and on restoring pRNA levels NoRC translocated back into the nucleoli. Mutating pRNA also showed that its sequence and secondary structure are crucial for NoRC localization as altering the structure of sequence prevented NoRC translocation to the nucleoli. These studies confirmed that pRNA has a role gene silencing by targeting chromatin remodelling complex to a rDNA gene promoters where both pRNA sequence and structure are crucial for its function.
