= Natural antisense short interfering RNA =

Natural antisense short interfering RNA (natsiRNA) is a type of siRNA. They are endogenous RNA regulators which are between 21 and 24 nucleotides in length, and are generated from complementary mRNA transcripts which are further processed into siRNA.

natsiRNA has been implicated in several developmental and response mechanisms in plants, such as pathogen resistance, salt tolerance and cell wall biosynthesis. natsiRNA has also been shown to alter gene expression in plants responding to environmental stressors.
