= Protein Sciences =

Pharmaceutical company in Connecticut, United States

Protein Sciences Corporation
- Company type: Private
- Industry: Biotechnology
- Headquarters: Meriden, Connecticut, USA
- Products: Vaccines, biopharmaceuticals
- Owner: Sanofi (since 2017)
- Website: Official website

Protein Sciences Corporation is a biotech company based in Meriden, Connecticut. The company develops and produces vaccines and biopharmaceuticals for use against influenza and other diseases. In 2017, the company was acquired by Sanofi for $750 million.

== Vaccines ==
Protein Sciences has developed a novel method for vaccine production, using a genetically modified baculovirus that is allowed to reproduce in insect cells. This method reduces the lead time for vaccine production to six to eight weeks, considerably shorter than the conventional, egg-based, method. The company has applied for a Biologic License Application with the U.S. Food and Drug Administration (FDA) for Flublok, their seasonal influenza vaccine. On Jan 17, 2013, Protein Sciences announced that the U.S. Food and Drug Administration had approved Flublok influenza vaccine for use in people 18–49 years old. Since then, Flublok's age indication has been expanded to all adults 18 and older as of October 29, 2014. Flublok is currently available.
