= NSUN2 =

Protein-coding gene in the species Homo sapiens

Identifiers
- Aliases: NSUN2, MISU, MRT5, SAKI, TRM4, NOP2/Sun RNA methyltransferase family member 2, NOP2/Sun RNA methyltransferase 2
- External IDs: OMIM: 610916; MGI: 107252; GeneCards: NSUN2
Enzyme activity
EC #	BRENDA	ExPASy	KEGG	MetaCyc
2.1.1.203	↗	↗	↗	↗

Gene location (Human)
Chr.	Chromosome 5 (human)
Band	5p15.31	Start	6,599,239 bp
Band	5p15.31	End	6,633,291 bp

Gene location (Mouse)
Chr.	Chromosome 13 (mouse)
Band	13 B3|13 35.55 cM	Start	69,681,865 bp
Band	13 B3|13 35.55 cM	End	69,783,899 bp
RNA expression pattern
Bgee	Human / Mouse (ortholog); Top expressed in: skin of arm; right uterine tube; secondary oocyte; right lobe of liver; skin of abdomen; appendix; skin of leg; lymph node; pancreatic epithelial cell; spleen / Top expressed in: otic placode; otic vesicle; tail of embryo; epiblast; saccule; Ileal epithelium; primitive streak; abdominal wall; genital tubercle; hair follicle; More reference expression data
BioGPS	n/a
Gene ontology
Molecular function	methyltransferase activity; transferase activity; tRNA binding; tRNA (cytosine-5-)-methyltransferase activity; RNA binding
Cellular component	cytoplasm; chromatoid body; spindle; nucleoplasm; nucleolus; cytoskeleton; nucleus
Biological process	tRNA methylation; meiotic cell cycle checkpoint signaling; cell division; tRNA modification; methylation; spermatid development; cell cycle; tRNA processing; hair follicle maturation
Sources:Amigo / QuickGO
Orthologs
Databases	NCBI: entry; OMA: entry
Species	Human	Mouse
Entrez	54888	28114
Ensembl	ENSG00000037474	ENSMUSG00000021595
UniProt	Q08J23	Q1HFZ0
RefSeq (mRNA)	NM_001193455; NM_017755	NM_145354
RefSeq (protein)	NP_001180384; NP_060225	NP_663329
Location (UCSC)	Chr 5: 6.6 – 6.63 Mb	Chr 13: 69.68 – 69.78 Mb
PubMed search
- Wikidata
View/Edit Human	View/Edit Mouse

NOP2/Sun domain family, member 2 is a protein that in humans is encoded by the NSUN2 gene. Alternatively spliced transcript variants encoding different isoforms have been noted for the gene.

== Function ==
The protein is a methyltransferase that catalyzes the methylation of cytosine to 5-methylcytosine (m5C) at position 34 of intron-containing tRNA (Leu)(CAA) precursors. This modification is necessary to stabilize the anticodon-codon pairing and correctly translate the mRNA. NSUN2 is also localized on mitochondria and is capable of introducing post-transcriptional modifications in mitochondrial tRNAs.

== Clinical relevance ==
Mutations in this gene have been found associated to cases of Dubowitz-like syndrome.
