= RPP14 =

Protein-coding gene in the species Homo sapiens

Identifiers
- Aliases: RPP14, P14, HsHTD2, ribonuclease P/MRP subunit p14
- External IDs: OMIM: 606112; MGI: 1914303; GeneCards: RPP14
Available structures
PDB	Ortholog search: PDBe RCSB
PDB	List of PDB id codes 3IR3
Enzyme activity
EC #	BRENDA	ExPASy	KEGG	MetaCyc
4.2.1.59	↗	↗	↗	↗

Gene location (Human)
Chr.	Chromosome 3 (human)
Band	3p14.3	Start	58,306,245 bp
Band	3p14.3	End	58,324,695 bp

Gene location (Mouse)
Chr.	Chromosome 14 (mouse)
Band	14|14 A1	Start	14,377,939 bp
Band	14|14 A1	End	14,389,406 bp
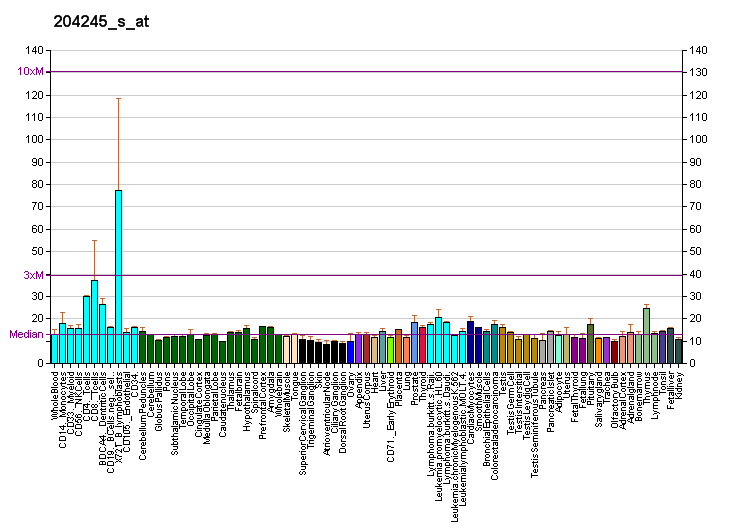
RNA expression pattern
Bgee	Human / Mouse (ortholog); Top expressed in: muscle of thigh; gonad; gastrocnemius muscle; Achilles tendon; mucosa of transverse colon; stromal cell of endometrium; testicle; epithelium of colon; ventricular zone; smooth muscle tissue / Top expressed in: ventricular zone; seminal vesicula; embryo; embryo; morula; sternocleidomastoid muscle; epiblast; temporal muscle; triceps brachii muscle; facial motor nucleus; More reference expression data
BioGPS	More reference expression data
Gene ontology
Molecular function	ribonuclease activity; hydrolase activity; RNA binding; ribonuclease P activity; lyase activity; 3-hydroxyacyl-CoA dehydratase activity
Cellular component	nucleus; nucleoplasm; multimeric ribonuclease P complex; nucleolus; mitochondrion; mitochondrial matrix
Biological process	RNA phosphodiester bond hydrolysis; RNA phosphodiester bond hydrolysis, endonucleolytic; tRNA processing; tRNA 5'-leader removal; fatty acid metabolic process; lipid metabolism; fatty-acyl-CoA biosynthetic process
Sources:Amigo / QuickGO
Orthologs
Databases	NCBI: entry; OMA: entry
Species	Human	Mouse
Entrez	11102	67053
Ensembl	ENSG00000163684	ENSMUSG00000023156
UniProt	O95059; P86397	Q9CQH8
RefSeq (mRNA)	NM_001098783; NM_007042	NM_025938
RefSeq (protein)	NP_001092253; NP_008973; NP_001335641; NP_001335642; NP_001335643 NP_001335644	NP_080214
Location (UCSC)	Chr 3: 58.31 – 58.32 Mb	Chr 14: 14.38 – 14.39 Mb
PubMed search
- Wikidata
View/Edit Human	View/Edit Mouse

Ribonuclease P protein subunit p14 is an enzyme that in humans is encoded by the RPP14 gene.
