= RPP30 =

Protein-coding gene in the species Homo sapiens

Identifiers
- Aliases: RPP30, TSG15, ribonuclease P/MRP subunit p30
- External IDs: OMIM: 606115; MGI: 1859683; GeneCards: RPP30

Gene location (Human)
Chr.	Chromosome 10 (human)
Band	10q23.31	Start	90,871,952 bp
Band	10q23.31	End	90,908,553 bp

Gene location (Mouse)
Chr.	Chromosome 19 (mouse)
Band	19|19 C2	Start	36,061,116 bp
Band	19|19 C2	End	36,082,177 bp
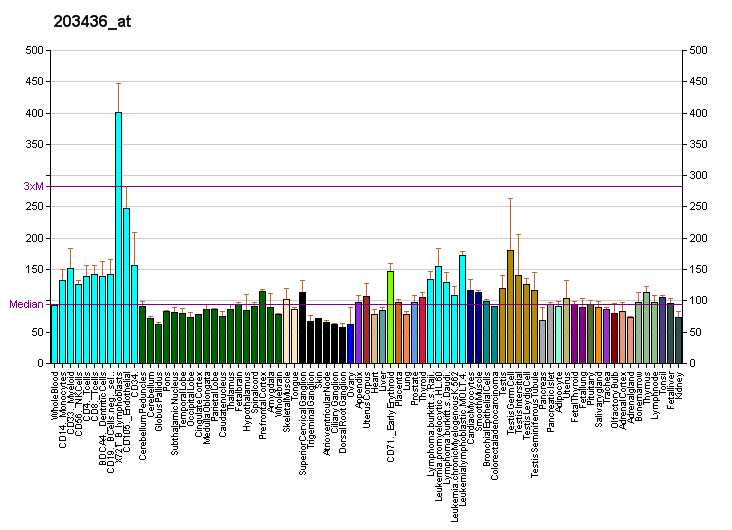
RNA expression pattern
Bgee	Human / Mouse (ortholog); Top expressed in: gonad; ventricular zone; ganglionic eminence; right testis; left testis; muscle of thigh; testicle; Achilles tendon; islet of Langerhans; gastric mucosa / Top expressed in: spermatocyte; spermatid; medial ganglionic eminence; fetal liver hematopoietic progenitor cell; morula; otic placode; primitive streak; endothelial cell of lymphatic vessel; embryo; embryo; More reference expression data
BioGPS	More reference expression data
Gene ontology
Molecular function	ribonuclease activity; protein binding; catalytic activity; hydrolase activity; RNA binding; ribonuclease P activity
Cellular component	nucleolus; nucleus; nucleolar ribonuclease P complex; nucleoplasm; ribonuclease MRP complex; multimeric ribonuclease P complex
Biological process	rRNA processing; tRNA processing; RNA phosphodiester bond hydrolysis, endonucleolytic; tRNA 5'-leader removal; RNA phosphodiester bond hydrolysis
Sources:Amigo / QuickGO
Orthologs
Databases	NCBI: entry; OMA: entry
Species	Human	Mouse
Entrez	10556	54364
Ensembl	ENSG00000148688	ENSMUSG00000024800
UniProt	P78346	O88796
RefSeq (mRNA)	NM_001104546; NM_006413	NM_019428
RefSeq (protein)	NP_001098016; NP_006404	NP_062301
Location (UCSC)	Chr 10: 90.87 – 90.91 Mb	Chr 19: 36.06 – 36.08 Mb
PubMed search
- Wikidata
View/Edit Human	View/Edit Mouse

Ribonuclease P protein subunit p30 is an enzyme that in humans is encoded by the RPP30 gene.
