= SL2 RNA =

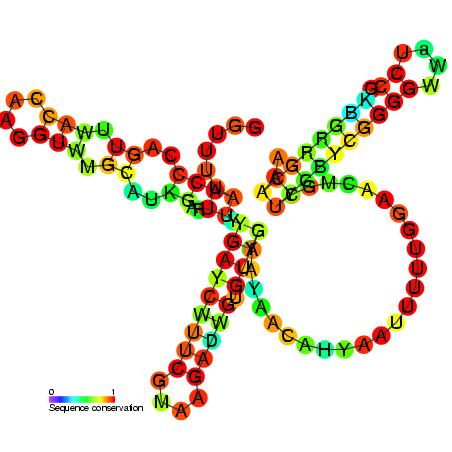
- Predicted secondary structure and sequence conservation of SL2

Identifiers
- Symbol: SL2
- Rfam: RF00199

Other data
- RNA type: Gene
- Domain(s): Eukaryota
- GO: GO:0000365
- SO: SO:0000233
- PDB structures: PDBe

SL2 RNA is a non-coding RNA involved in trans-splicing in lower eukaryotes. Trans-splicing is a form of RNA processing. The acquisition of a spliced leader from an SL RNA is an inter-molecular reaction which precisely joins exons derived from separately transcribed RNAs. Approximately 25% of C. elegans genes are organised into polycistronic transcription units and the presence of SL2 on an mRNA is an indication the gene is in an operon.
