= RPP38 =

Protein-coding gene in the species Homo sapiens

Identifiers
- Aliases: RPP38, ribonuclease P/MRP subunit p38
- External IDs: OMIM: 606116; MGI: 2443607; GeneCards: RPP38

Gene location (Human)
Chr.	Chromosome 10 (human)
Band	10p13	Start	15,097,180 bp
Band	10p13	End	15,139,818 bp

Gene location (Mouse)
Chr.	Chromosome 2 (mouse)
Band	2|2 A1	Start	3,329,986 bp
Band	2|2 A1	End	3,333,680 bp
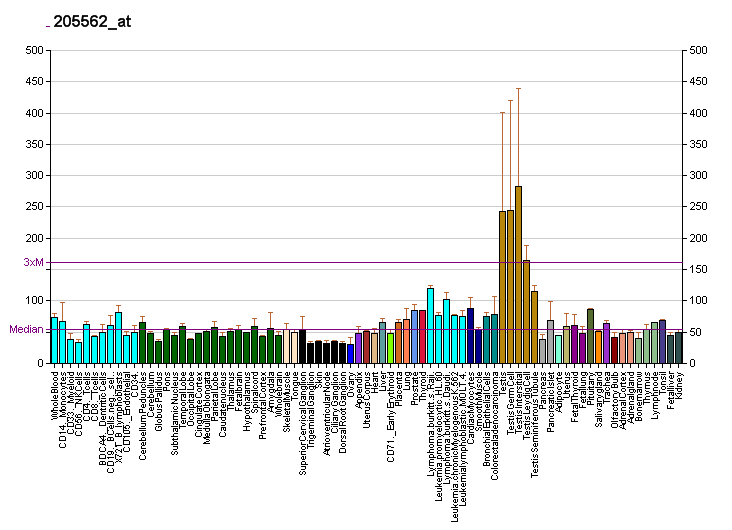
RNA expression pattern
Bgee	Human / Mouse (ortholog); Top expressed in: left testis; right testis; bronchial epithelial cell; olfactory zone of nasal mucosa; right uterine tube; mucosa of transverse colon; sperm; nasal epithelium; oocyte; granulocyte / Top expressed in: primary oocyte; spermatocyte; secondary oocyte; genital tubercle; zygote; morula; epiblast; spermatid; tail of embryo; testicle; More reference expression data
BioGPS	More reference expression data
Gene ontology
Molecular function	hydrolase activity; protein binding; ribonuclease P activity
Cellular component	nucleus; nucleolus; nucleoplasm; nucleolar ribonuclease P complex; fibrillar center
Biological process	RNA phosphodiester bond hydrolysis, endonucleolytic; RNA phosphodiester bond hydrolysis; tRNA processing; tRNA 5'-leader removal
Sources:Amigo / QuickGO
Orthologs
Databases	NCBI: entry; OMA: entry
Species	Human	Mouse
Entrez	10557	227522
Ensembl	ENSG00000152464	ENSMUSG00000049950
UniProt	P78345; Q5VUC3	A2AJG0
RefSeq (mRNA)	NM_001097590; NM_001265601; NM_006414; NM_183005	NM_001013376
RefSeq (protein)	NP_001091059; NP_001252530; NP_006405; NP_892117	NP_001013394
Location (UCSC)	Chr 10: 15.1 – 15.14 Mb	Chr 2: 3.33 – 3.33 Mb
PubMed search
- Wikidata
View/Edit Human	View/Edit Mouse

Ribonuclease P protein subunit p38 is an enzyme that in humans is encoded by the RPP38 gene.

== Interactions ==
RPP38 has been shown to interact with POP4.
