= POP5 =

Protein-coding gene in the species Homo sapiens

Identifiers
- Aliases: POP5, HSPC004, RPP2, RPP20, hPop5, POP5 homolog, ribonuclease P/MRP subunit
- External IDs: OMIM: 609992; MGI: 2151221; GeneCards: POP5

Gene location (Human)
Chr.	Chromosome 12 (human)
Band	12q24.31	Start	120,578,764 bp
Band	12q24.31	End	120,581,402 bp

Gene location (Mouse)
Chr.	Chromosome 5 (mouse)
Band	5|5 F	Start	115,373,895 bp
Band	5|5 F	End	115,383,410 bp
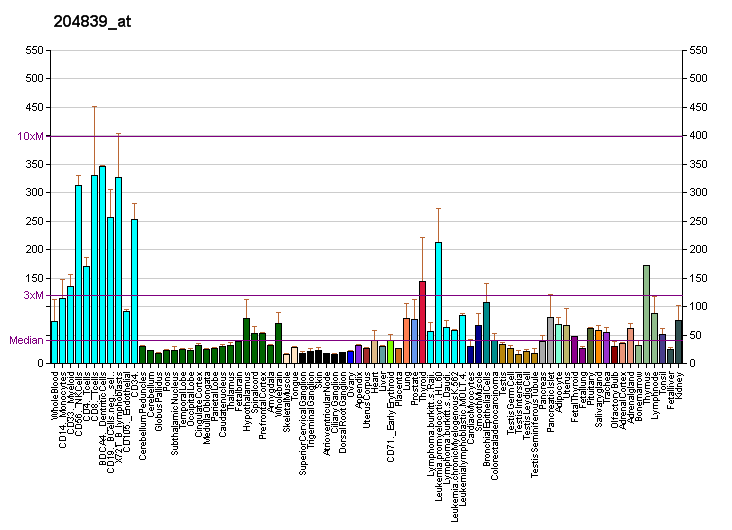
RNA expression pattern
Bgee	Human / Mouse (ortholog); Top expressed in: mucosa of transverse colon; right adrenal gland; right adrenal cortex; anterior pituitary; left adrenal cortex; right lobe of thyroid gland; left lobe of thyroid gland; right lobe of liver; right uterine tube; spleen / Top expressed in: dentate gyrus of hippocampal formation granule cell; right kidney; superior frontal gyrus; embryo; yolk sac; primary visual cortex; facial motor nucleus; embryo; proximal tubule; human kidney; More reference expression data
BioGPS	More reference expression data
Gene ontology
Molecular function	ribonuclease activity; protein binding; hydrolase activity; ribonuclease P activity
Cellular component	nucleolus; nucleolar ribonuclease P complex; nucleus; nucleoplasm; ribonuclease MRP complex; multimeric ribonuclease P complex
Biological process	RNA metabolic process; RNA phosphodiester bond hydrolysis; RNA phosphodiester bond hydrolysis, endonucleolytic; tRNA processing; protein lipoylation; tRNA 5'-leader removal; rRNA processing
Sources:Amigo / QuickGO
Orthologs
Databases	NCBI: entry; OMA: entry
Species	Human	Mouse
Entrez	51367	117109
Ensembl	ENSG00000167272	ENSMUSG00000060152
UniProt	Q969H6	Q9DB28
RefSeq (mRNA)	NM_015918; NM_198201; NM_198202	NM_026398
RefSeq (protein)	NP_057002; NP_937845	NP_080674; NP_001390591
Location (UCSC)	Chr 12: 120.58 – 120.58 Mb	Chr 5: 115.37 – 115.38 Mb
PubMed search
- Wikidata
View/Edit Human	View/Edit Mouse

Ribonuclease P/MRP protein subunit POP5 is an enzyme that in humans is encoded by the POP5 gene.
