= Ribonucleases P/MRP protein subunit POP1 =

Protein-coding gene in the species Homo sapiens

POP1

Identifiers
- Aliases: POP1, POP1 homolog, ribonuclease P/MRP subunit, ANXD2
- External IDs: OMIM: 602486; MGI: 1914974; GeneCards: POP1

Gene location (Human)
Chr.	Chromosome 8 (human)
Band	8q22.2	Start	98,117,293 bp
Band	8q22.2	End	98,159,835 bp

Gene location (Mouse)
Chr.	Chromosome 15 (mouse)
Band	15|15 B3.1	Start	34,495,450 bp
Band	15|15 B3.1	End	34,530,794 bp
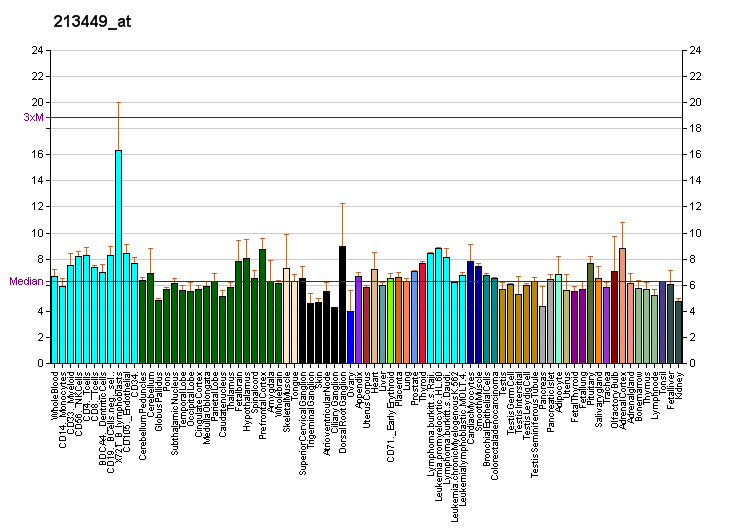
RNA expression pattern
Bgee	Human / Mouse (ortholog); Top expressed in: testicle; gonad; stromal cell of endometrium; ganglionic eminence; ventricular zone; islet of Langerhans; Achilles tendon; apex of heart; granulocyte; rectum / Top expressed in: zygote; primary oocyte; hand; ventricular zone; epiblast; tail of embryo; Rostral migratory stream; secondary oocyte; proximal tubule; lens; More reference expression data
BioGPS	More reference expression data
Gene ontology
Molecular function	protein binding; ribonuclease P activity; hydrolase activity; ribonuclease MRP activity; RNA binding
Cellular component	nucleolar ribonuclease P complex; nucleus; ribonuclease MRP complex; nucleoplasm; extracellular space; nucleolus; mitochondrion; Golgi apparatus; intracellular membrane-bounded organelle; multimeric ribonuclease P complex
Biological process	tRNA catabolic process; RNA processing; RNA phosphodiester bond hydrolysis; RNA phosphodiester bond hydrolysis, endonucleolytic; tRNA processing; tRNA 5'-leader removal
Sources:Amigo / QuickGO
Orthologs
Databases	NCBI: entry; OMA: entry
Species	Human	Mouse
Entrez	10940	67724
Ensembl	ENSG00000104356	ENSMUSG00000022325
UniProt	Q99575; Q96F88	n/a
RefSeq (mRNA)	NM_001145860; NM_001145861; NM_015029	NM_026340; NM_152894
RefSeq (protein)	NP_001139332; NP_001139333; NP_055844; NP_055844.2	n/a
Location (UCSC)	Chr 8: 98.12 – 98.16 Mb	Chr 15: 34.5 – 34.53 Mb
PubMed search
- Wikidata
View/Edit Human	View/Edit Mouse

Ribonucleases P/MRP protein subunit POP1 is a protein that in humans is encoded by the POP1 gene.

== Function ==
POP1 is a protein subunit of two different small nucleolar ribonucleoprotein complexes: the endoribonuclease for mitochondrial RNA processing complex and the ribonuclease P complex. This protein is a ribonuclease that localizes to the nucleus and functions in pre-RNA processing.

== Clinical significance ==
POP1 is also an autoantigen in patients with connective tissue diseases. Mutations in the POP1 gene result in severe anauxetic dysplasia.

== Interactions ==
POP1 (gene) has been shown to interact with POP4.
