= Vault (organelle) =

Eukaryotic organelle

- Structure of the vault complex from a rat liver cell.

Details
- Part of: Cell

Identifiers
- Latin: organella
- MeSH: D020394

The vault is a large cytoplasmic ribonucleoprotein, a non-membrane-bound organelle in most eukaryotic cells whose function is not yet fully understood. Discovered and isolated by Nancy Kedersha and Leonard Rome in 1986, vaults are cytoplasmic structures (outside the nucleus) which, when negative stained and viewed under an electron microscope, resemble the arches of a cathedral's vaulted ceiling, with 39-fold symmetry. They are present in most eukaryotes and are highly conserved.

Most human cells have around 10,000 vaults, and in some types of immune cell there may be up to 100,000. Macrophages have the greatest number of vaults of any human cell.

== Morphology ==
Vaults are large ribonucleoprotein particles. About 3 times the size of a ribosome and weighing approximately 13 MDa, they are found in most eukaryotic cells. They measure 34 nm by 60 nm from a negative stain, 26 nm by 49 nm from cryo-electron microscopy, and 35 nm by 59 nm from STEM. The vault consists primarily of proteins, making it difficult to stain with conventional techniques.

=== Structure ===
The vault structure is highly conserved across species. The vault is the largest ribonucleic particle in the cell cytoplasm, made up of two identical, symmetrical half-vaults. A small number of vaults are localised to the outer surface of the nuclear membrane, at or near the nuclear pore complexes, suggesting a gateway. The hollow interior of the vault is large enough to enclose a ribosome. The vault is three times larger than the ribosome yet contains only three proteins compared to the near hundred in a ribosome.

The protein structure consists of an outer shell composed of 78 copies of the ~100 kDa major vault protein (MVP). Inside are two associated vault proteins, TEP1 and PARP4. TEP1, also known as the telomerase-associated protein 1, is 290 kDa and PARP4 is related to poly (ADP-ribose) polymerase (PARP) and is 193 kDa. Vaults from many multicellular eukaryotes also contain one or several small vault RNAs (vRNAs, also known as vtRNAs) of 86–141 bases within. Each major vault protein takes up around 70% of the mass, and has more than 800 amino acids.

The MVP subunits are composed head-to-head, with the N-termini of each half-vault facing each other. From the N-terminal to the C-terminal, a MVP subunit folds into 9 repeat domains, 1 band7-like shoulder domain, 1 cap-helix domain, and 1 cap-ring domain, corresponding to the shape of the vault shell. PARP4 binds to repeat domain #4. TEP1, itself a ring due to the WD40 repeat, binds to the cap domain, with one particular type of vRNA plugging the cap.

== Function ==
Despite not being fully elucidated, vaults have been associated with the nuclear pore complexes and their octagonal shape appears to support this. Vaults have been implicated in a broad range of cellular functions including nuclear-cytoplasmic transport, mRNA localization, drug resistance, cell signaling, nuclear pore assembly, and innate immunity. They may serve as scaffolds for signal transduction proteins. Vaults are present in most normal tissues, and more so in secretory and excretory epithelial cells, and in bronchial and intestinal-lining cells. Vaults are over expressed in many multidrug resistant cancer cells.

The three vault proteins (MVP, PARP4, and TEP1) have each been knocked out individually and in combination (PARP4 and TEP1) in mice. All of the knockout mice are viable and no major phenotypic alterations have been observed. Dictyostelium encode three different MVPs, two of which have been knocked out singly and in combination. The only phenotype seen in the Dictyostelium double knockout was growth retardation under nutritional stress. If vaults are involved in essential cellular functions, it seems likely that redundant systems exist that can ameliorate their loss.

== Association with cancer ==
In the late 1990s, researchers found that vaults (especially the MVP) were over-expressed in cancer patients who were diagnosed with multidrug resistance, that is the resistance against many chemotherapy treatments. Although this does not prove that increased number of vaults led to drug resistance, it does hint at some sort of involvement. This has potential in discovering the mechanisms behind drug-resistance in tumor cells and improving anticancer drugs.

== Evolutionary conservation ==
Vaults have been identified in mammals, amphibians, avians and slime mold. The Vault model used by the Pfam database identifies homologues in Paramecium tetraurelia, Kinetoplastida, a cnidarian (starlet sea anemone), molluscs, Trichoplax adhaerens, flatworms, Echinococcus granulosus and Choanoflagellate.

Although vaults have been observed in many eukaryotes, they are absent in insects, fungi and probably also plants. These include the well known model organisms:

- Arabidopsis thaliana—a small flowering plant related to cabbage and mustard.
- Caenorhabditis elegans—a free-living nematode that lives in soil.
- Drosophila melanogaster—a two-winged insect also known as a fruit fly.
- Saccharomyces cerevisiae—a yeast species.

Despite these exceptions, existing vaults in different organisms are highly similar. Studies have concluded that vaults were present in the LCA but have been lost over evolutionary time in some groups, the insects, fungi and probably plants.

Homologs of the major vault protein have been computationally found in bacteria. Cyanobacterial sequences appear most similar. Non-eukaryotic vaults appear to have tremendous diversity in their organization. Pfam is also able to identify some such homologs.

== Vault engineering ==
The Rome lab at UCLA has collaborated with a number of groups to use the baculovirus system to produce large quantities of vaults. When the major vault protein (MVP) is expressed in insect cells, vault particles are assembled on polyribosomes in the cytoplasm. By using molecular genetic techniques to modify the gene encoding the major vault protein, vault particles have been produced with chemically active peptides attached to their sequence. These modified proteins are incorporated into the inside of the vault particle without altering its basic structure. Proteins and peptides can also be packaged into vaults by attachment of a packaging domain derived from the PARP4 protein. A number of modified vault particles have been produced in order to test the concept that vaults can be bio-engineered to allow their use in a wide variety of biological applications including drug delivery, biological sensors, enzyme delivery, controlled release, and environmental remediation.

A vault has been packaged with a chemokine for potential use to activate the immune system to attack lung cancer.
