= RPP40 =

Protein-coding gene in the species Homo sapiens

Identifiers
- Aliases: RPP40, RNASEP1, bA428J1.3, ribonuclease P/MRP subunit p40
- External IDs: OMIM: 606117; MGI: 1346084; GeneCards: RPP40

Gene location (Human)
Chr.	Chromosome 6 (human)
Band	6p25.1	Start	4,994,717 bp
Band	6p25.1	End	5,004,063 bp

Gene location (Mouse)
Chr.	Chromosome 13 (mouse)
Band	13|13 A3.3	Start	36,077,455 bp
Band	13|13 A3.3	End	36,090,342 bp
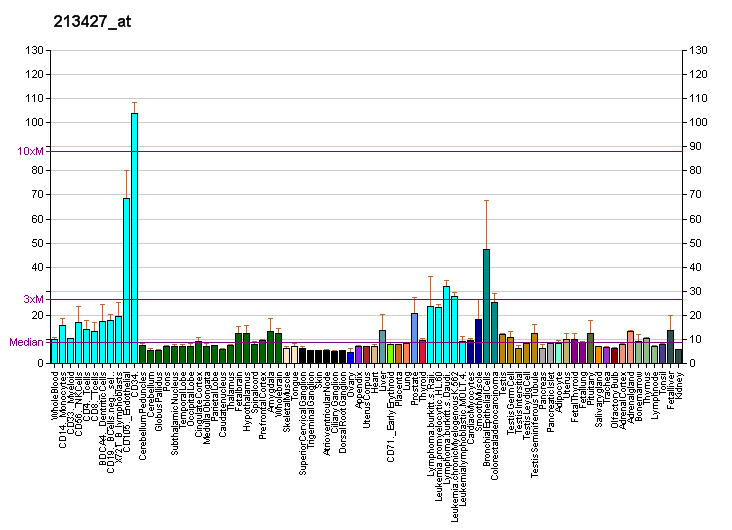
RNA expression pattern
Bgee	Human / Mouse (ortholog); Top expressed in: testicle; gonad; right adrenal cortex; left adrenal gland; endothelial cell; mucosa of pharynx; left adrenal cortex; secondary oocyte; gingival epithelium; middle temporal gyrus / Top expressed in: morula; embryo; embryo; lumbar spinal ganglion; epiblast; muscle of thigh; blastocyst; proximal tubule; right kidney; yolk sac; More reference expression data
BioGPS	More reference expression data
Gene ontology
Molecular function	ribonuclease P activity; hydrolase activity
Cellular component	nucleolus; nucleus; nucleolar ribonuclease P complex; nucleoplasm
Biological process	RNA phosphodiester bond hydrolysis, endonucleolytic; RNA phosphodiester bond hydrolysis; tRNA processing; tRNA 5'-leader removal
Sources:Amigo / QuickGO
Orthologs
Databases	NCBI: entry; OMA: entry
Species	Human	Mouse
Entrez	10799	208366
Ensembl	ENSG00000124787	ENSMUSG00000021418
UniProt	O75818	Q8R1F9
RefSeq (mRNA)	NM_001286132; NM_001286133; NM_006638	NM_145938
RefSeq (protein)	NP_001273061; NP_001273062; NP_006629	NP_666050
Location (UCSC)	Chr 6: 4.99 – 5 Mb	Chr 13: 36.08 – 36.09 Mb
PubMed search
- Wikidata
View/Edit Human	View/Edit Mouse

Ribonuclease P protein subunit p40 is an enzyme that in humans is encoded by the RPP40 gene.
