= Y RNA =

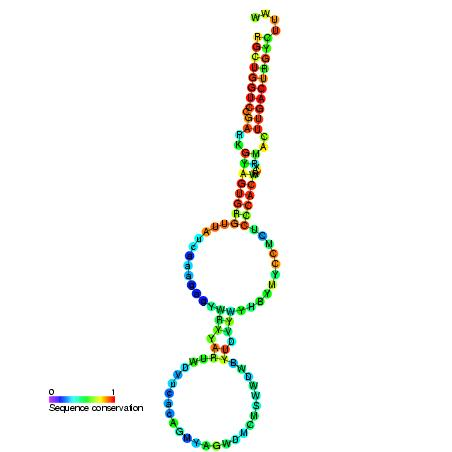
- Predicted secondary structure and sequence conservation of Y_RNA

Identifiers
- Symbol: Y_RNA
- Alt. Symbols: Y1; Y3; Y4; Y5
- Rfam: RF00019

Other data
- RNA type: Gene
- Domain: Eukaryota
- SO: SO:0000405
- PDB structures: PDBe

Y RNAs are small non-coding RNAs. They are components of the Ro60 ribonucleoprotein particle which is a target of autoimmune antibodies in patients with systemic lupus erythematosus. They are also reported to be necessary for DNA replication through interactions with chromatin and initiation proteins. However, mouse embryonic stem cells lacking Y RNAs are viable and have normal cell cycles.

== Structure ==
These small RNAs are predicted to fold into a conserved stem formed by the RNA's 3′ and 5′ ends and characterized by a single bulged cytosine, which are the known requirements for Ro binding.

== Function ==
Two functions have been described for Y RNAs in the literature: As a repressor of Ro60, and as an initiation factor for DNA replication. Mutant human Y RNAs lacking the conserved binding site for Ro60 protein still support DNA replication, indicating that binding to Ro protein and promoting DNA replication are two separable functions of Y RNAs. Although Y RNA-derived small RNAs are similar in size to microRNAs, it has been shown that these Y RNA fragments are not involved in the microRNA pathway.

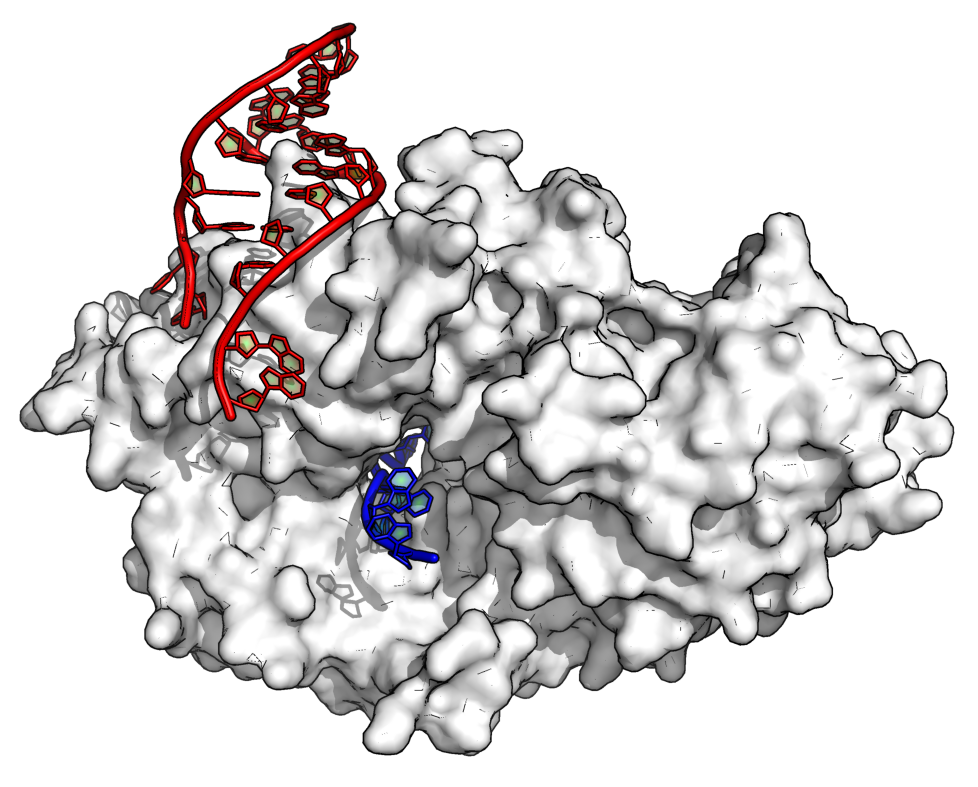
The Ro autoantigen protein (white) binds the end of a double-stranded Y RNA (red) and a single stranded RNA (blue). (PDB: 1YVP).

=== Ro60 Inhibition ===
In its free state, Ro binds to a variety of misfolded RNAs including misfolded 5S rRNAs, and is thought to act as some sort of quality control mechanism. Crystal structures of Ro complexed either with Y RNA or another RNA showed that Ro binds single-stranded 3′ ends of RNAs relatively nonspecifically, whereas Y RNA binds specifically at a second site that regulates access of other RNAs. In Deinococcus, free Ro has also been shown to function in 23S rRNA maturation. In Deinococcus, mutants lacking Y RNA are viable, and Y RNA appears to be unstable except when complexed with Ro.

=== DNA replication initiation ===
Human Y RNAs are functionally required for DNA replication. Biochemical fractionation and reconstitution experiments have established a functional requirement of human Y RNAs for chromosomal DNA replication in isolated vertebrate cell nuclei in vitro and specific degradation of human Y RNAs inhibits DNA replication in vitro, and in intact cells in vivo. Y RNA function is thought to be mediated via interactions with chromatin and initiation proteins (including the origin recognition complex)

=== In human pathology ===
Y RNAs are overexpressed in some human tumours and are required for cell proliferation and small, microRNA-sized breakdown products may be involved in autoimmunity and other pathological conditions. Recent work has demonstrated that Y RNAs are modified at their 3′ end by the non-canonical poly(A) polymerase PAPD5, and the short oligo(A) tail added by PAPD5 is a marker for 3′ end processing by the ribonuclease PARN/EXOSC10 or for degradation by the exonuclease DIS3L. Since PARN deficiency causes a severe form of the bone marrow disease Dyskeratosis Congenita as well as pulmonary fibrosis, it is possible that defects in Y RNA processing contribute to the severe pathology observed in these patients.

== Species distribution ==
Presumptive Y RNA and Ro protein homologs have been found in eukaryotes and bacteria.

=== Humans ===
Humans appear to have four Y RNAs, named hY1, hY3, hY4 and hY5 and also a large number of pseudogenes.

=== C. elegans ===
Caenorhabditis elegans has one, named CeY RNA and a large number of sbRNAs that are postulated to also be Y RNA homologues.

=== D. radiodurans ===
The radiation-resistant bacterium Deinococcus radiodurans encodes a homolog of Ro called rsr ("Ro sixty related"), and at least four small RNAs accumulate in Deinococcus under conditions where rsr expression is induced (UV irradiation); one of these RNAs appears to be a Y RNA homolog. In Deinococcus radiodurans Rsr is tethered via Y RNA to the exoribonuclease PNPase and channels single-stranded RNA into the PNPase cavity. Rsr and Y RNA enhance degradation of structured RNAs by PNPase. This role could be conserved, as Rsr and ncRNAs called YrlA and YrlB (Y RNA like) also associate with PNPase in an evolutionary distant bacterium Salmonella Typhimurium.
