= POP7 =

Protein-coding gene in the species Homo sapiens

Identifiers
- Aliases: POP7, 0610037N12Rik, RPP2, RPP20, POP7 homolog, ribonuclease P/MRP subunit
- External IDs: OMIM: 606113; MGI: 1921347; GeneCards: POP7

Gene location (Human)
| Chr. | Chromosome 7 (human) |
| Band | 7q22.1 | Start | 100,706,121 bp |
| Band | 7q22.1 | End | 100,707,486 bp |

Gene location (Mouse)
| Chr. | Chromosome 5 (mouse) |
| Band | 5|5 G2 | Start | 137,499,700 bp |
| Band | 5|5 G2 | End | 137,500,780 bp |
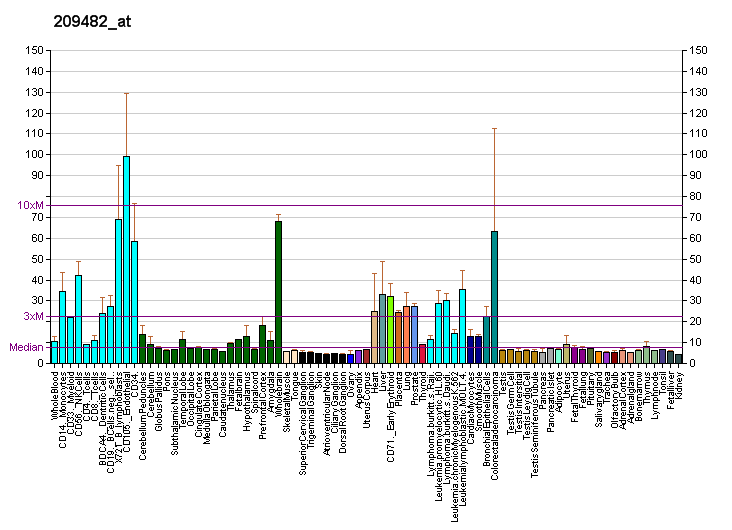
RNA expression pattern
| Bgee | Human / Mouse (ortholog); Top expressed in: prefrontal cortex; gastrocnemius muscle; gonad; right frontal lobe; middle temporal gyrus; muscle of thigh; Brodmann area 9; skin of leg; right lobe of liver; skin of abdomen / Top expressed in: otic placode; morula; otic vesicle; interventricular septum; blastocyst; embryo; yolk sac; saccule; embryo; neural tube; More reference expression data |
| BioGPS | More reference expression data |
Gene ontology
| Molecular function | nucleic acid binding; protein binding; hydrolase activity; RNA binding; ribonuclease P activity |
| Cellular component | cytoplasm; nucleolus; nucleus; nucleolar ribonuclease P complex; nucleoplasm; ribonuclease MRP complex; multimeric ribonuclease P complex |
| Biological process | tRNA processing; RNA phosphodiester bond hydrolysis, endonucleolytic; tRNA 5'-leader removal; RNA phosphodiester bond hydrolysis |
Sources:Amigo / QuickGO
Orthologs
| Databases | NCBI: entry; OMA: entry |
| Species | Human | Mouse |
| Entrez | 10248 | 74097 |
| Ensembl | ENSG00000172336 | ENSMUSG00000029715 |
| UniProt | O75817 | Q9DCH2 |
| RefSeq (mRNA) | NM_005837 | NM_028753 |
| RefSeq (protein) | NP_005828 | NP_083029 |
| Location (UCSC) | Chr 7: 100.71 – 100.71 Mb | Chr 5: 137.5 – 137.5 Mb |
| PubMed search |
- Wikidata
| View/Edit Human | View/Edit Mouse |

Ribonuclease P protein subunit p20 is an enzyme that in humans is encoded by the POP7 gene.
