= POP4 (gene) =

Protein-coding gene in the species Homo sapiens

Identifiers
- Aliases: POP4, RPP29, POP4 homolog, ribonuclease P/MRP subunit
- External IDs: OMIM: 606114; MGI: 1913411; GeneCards: POP4

Gene location (Human)
| Chr. | Chromosome 19 (human) |
| Band | 19q12 | Start | 29,606,283 bp |
| Band | 19q12 | End | 29,617,237 bp |

Gene location (Mouse)
| Chr. | Chromosome 7 (mouse) |
| Band | 7|7 B3 | Start | 37,961,420 bp |
| Band | 7|7 B3 | End | 37,970,847 bp |
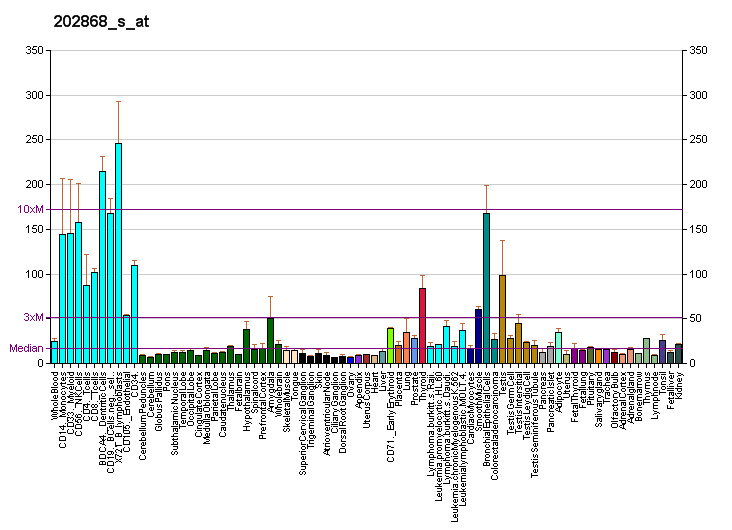
RNA expression pattern
| Bgee | Human / Mouse (ortholog); Top expressed in: right adrenal gland; right adrenal cortex; left adrenal gland; granulocyte; right coronary artery; left adrenal cortex; mucosa of transverse colon; buccal mucosa cell; left coronary artery; olfactory zone of nasal mucosa / Top expressed in: ganglionic eminence; blastocyst; ventricular zone; maxillary prominence; mandibular prominence; medial ganglionic eminence; morula; dermis; endothelial cell of lymphatic vessel; genital tubercle; More reference expression data |
| BioGPS | More reference expression data |
Gene ontology
| Molecular function | ribonuclease activity; protein binding; ribonuclease P RNA binding; ribonuclease MRP activity; hydrolase activity; RNA binding; ribonuclease P activity |
| Cellular component | ribonuclease P complex; nucleolus; nucleus; nucleoplasm; multimeric ribonuclease P complex; ribonuclease MRP complex |
| Biological process | tRNA processing; RNA phosphodiester bond hydrolysis, endonucleolytic; tRNA 5'-leader removal; rRNA processing; RNA processing; RNA phosphodiester bond hydrolysis |
Sources:Amigo / QuickGO
Orthologs
| Databases | NCBI: entry; OMA: entry |
| Species | Human | Mouse |
| Entrez | 10775 | 66161 |
| Ensembl | ENSG00000105171 | ENSMUSG00000030423 |
| UniProt | O95707 | Q9CR08 |
| RefSeq (mRNA) | NM_006627 | NM_025390 |
| RefSeq (protein) | NP_006618 | NP_079666 |
| Location (UCSC) | Chr 19: 29.61 – 29.62 Mb | Chr 7: 37.96 – 37.97 Mb |
| PubMed search |
- Wikidata
| View/Edit Human | View/Edit Mouse |

Ribonuclease P protein subunit p29 is an enzyme that in humans is encoded by the POP4 gene.

== Interactions ==
POP4 has been shown to interact with RPP38 and POP1.
