= SL1 RNA =

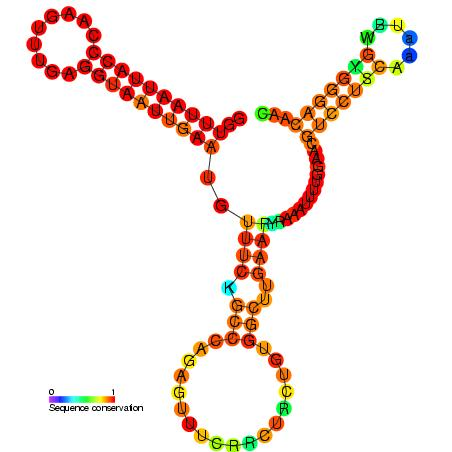
- Predicted secondary structure and sequence conservation of SL1

Identifiers
- Symbol: SL1
- Rfam: RF00198

Other data
- RNA type: Gene
- Domain(s): Eukaryota
- GO: GO:0000365
- SO: SO:0000233
- PDB structures: PDBe

This family represents the SL1 RNA. The gene encoding SL1 RNA is commonly, but not always, located in the spacer region between 5S-rRNA genes. The SL1 RNA is involved in trans-splicing, which is a form of RNA processing. The acquisition of a spliced leader from an SL RNA is an inter-molecular reaction that precisely joins exons derived from separately transcribed RNAs. This mechanism of mRNA maturation has been shown to occur in a number of lower eukaryotes and is commonplace in nematodes.
