= Major vault protein =

Protein-coding gene in the species Homo sapiens

MVP
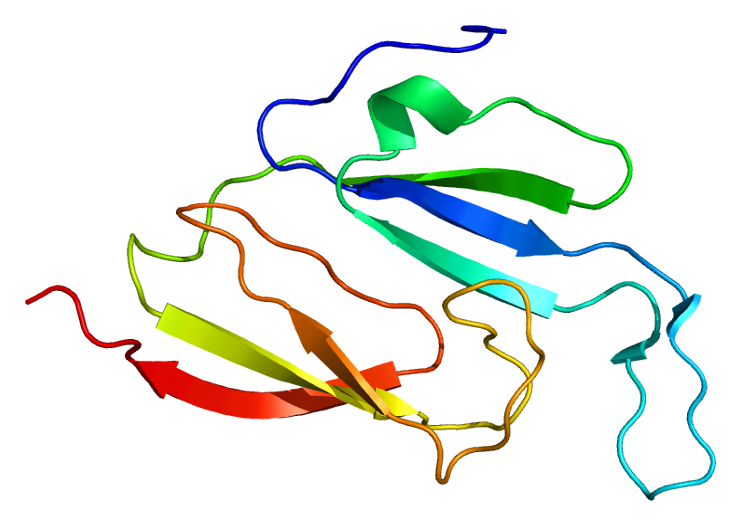

Identifiers
- Aliases: MVP, LRP, VAULT1, major vault protein, lung resistance-related protein
- External IDs: OMIM: 605088; MGI: 1925638; GeneCards: MVP
Available structures
PDB	Ortholog search: PDBe RCSB
PDB	List of PDB id codes 1Y7X

Gene location (Human)
Chr.	Chromosome 16 (human)
Band	16p11.2	Start	29,820,394 bp
Band	16p11.2	End	29,848,039 bp

Gene location (Mouse)
Chr.	Chromosome 7 (mouse)
Band	7|7 F3	Start	126,586,032 bp
Band	7|7 F3	End	126,613,793 bp
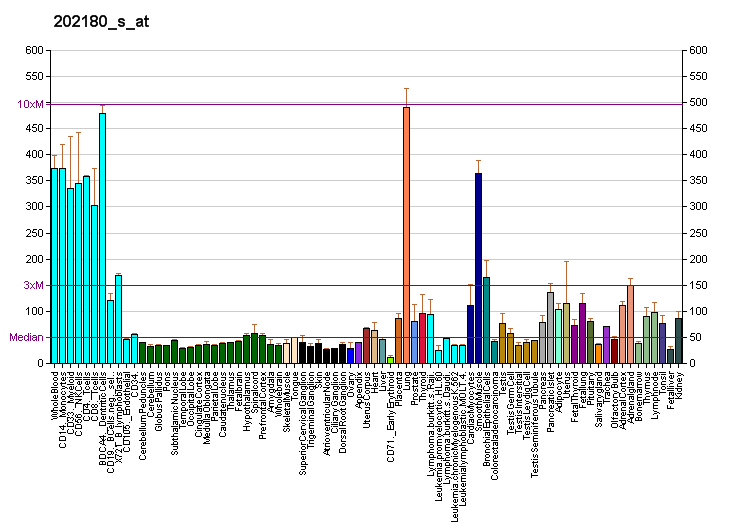

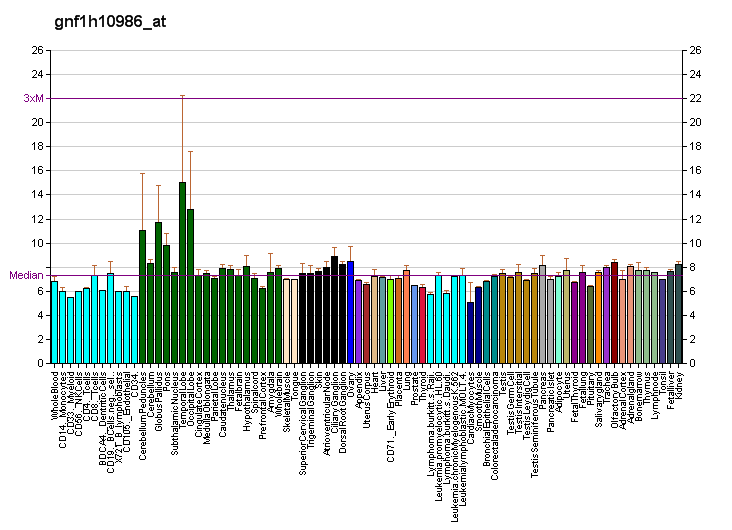

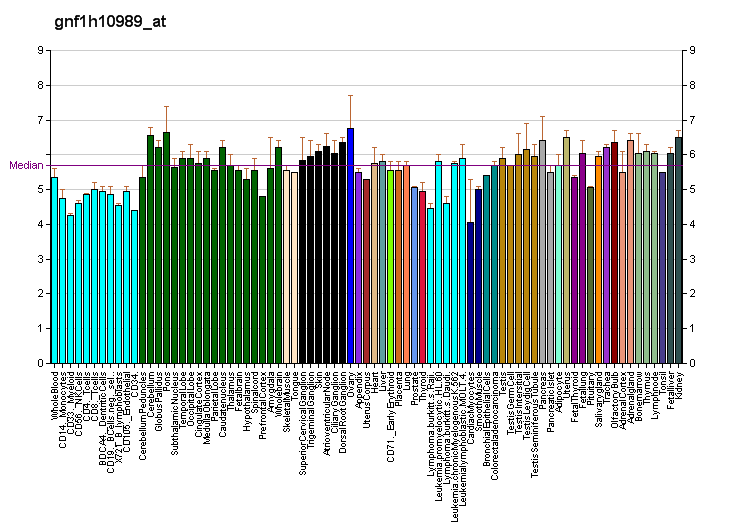
RNA expression pattern
Bgee	Human / Mouse (ortholog); Top expressed in: mucosa of transverse colon; right adrenal gland; left adrenal gland; left adrenal cortex; granulocyte; right adrenal cortex; epithelium of colon; upper lobe of left lung; stromal cell of endometrium; right ovary / Top expressed in: ankle joint; duodenum; intestinal villus; Ileal epithelium; jejunum; granulocyte; colon; yolk sac; lip; membranous bone; More reference expression data
BioGPS	More reference expression data
Gene ontology
Molecular function	protein phosphatase binding; protein binding; protein kinase binding; identical protein binding
Cellular component	cytoplasm; perinuclear region of cytoplasm; nuclear pore; extracellular exosome; cytoskeleton; membrane; nucleus; extracellular region; cytosol; secretory granule lumen; ficolin-1-rich granule lumen
Biological process	protein transport; mRNA transport; negative regulation of protein tyrosine kinase activity; ERBB signaling pathway; negative regulation of signaling; negative regulation of protein autophosphorylation; neutrophil degranulation; transport
Sources:Amigo / QuickGO
Orthologs
Databases	NCBI: entry; OMA: entry
Species	Human	Mouse
Entrez	9961	78388
Ensembl	ENSG00000013364	ENSMUSG00000030681
UniProt	Q14764	Q9EQK5
RefSeq (mRNA)	NM_017458; NM_001293204; NM_001293205; NM_005115	NM_080638
RefSeq (protein)	NP_001280133; NP_001280134; NP_005106; NP_059447; NP_001280134.1	NP_542369
Location (UCSC)	Chr 16: 29.82 – 29.85 Mb	Chr 7: 126.59 – 126.61 Mb
PubMed search
- Wikidata
View/Edit Human	View/Edit Mouse

Major vault protein, also known as lung resistance-related protein, is a protein that in humans is encoded by the MVP gene. 78 copies of the protein assemble into the large compartments called vaults.

== Function ==
Major vault protein comprises around 70% of the total protein content of Vaults which also contain vPARP and TEP1. Vaults are multi-subunit structures that may be involved in nucleo-cytoplasmic transport. MVP mediates drug resistance, through mechanism(s) which are poorly understood. Hypotheses involving drug transport or sequestration have been proposed. It is widely distributed in normal tissues and overexpressed in multidrug-resistant cancer cells. The protein overexpression is a potentially useful marker of clinical drug resistance. This gene produces two transcripts by using two alternative exon 2 sequences; however, the open reading frames are the same in both transcripts.

== Interactions ==
Major vault protein coimmunoprecipitates with the human estrogen receptor and treatment with estradiol increases major vault protein associated with the estrogen receptor in nuclear extracts.

Major vault protein has been shown to interact with estrogen receptor alpha, PTEN and PARP4.
