= TEP1 =

Protein-coding gene in the species Homo sapiens

Identifiers
- Aliases: TEP1, TLP1, TP1, TROVE1, VAULT2, p240, telomerase associated protein 1
- External IDs: OMIM: 601686; MGI: 109573; GeneCards: TEP1

Gene location (Human)
Chr.	Chromosome 14 (human)
Band	14q11.2	Start	20,365,667 bp
Band	14q11.2	End	20,413,501 bp

Gene location (Mouse)
Chr.	Chromosome 14 (mouse)
Band	14 C1|14 26.26 cM	Start	51,061,516 bp
Band	14 C1|14 26.26 cM	End	51,108,017 bp
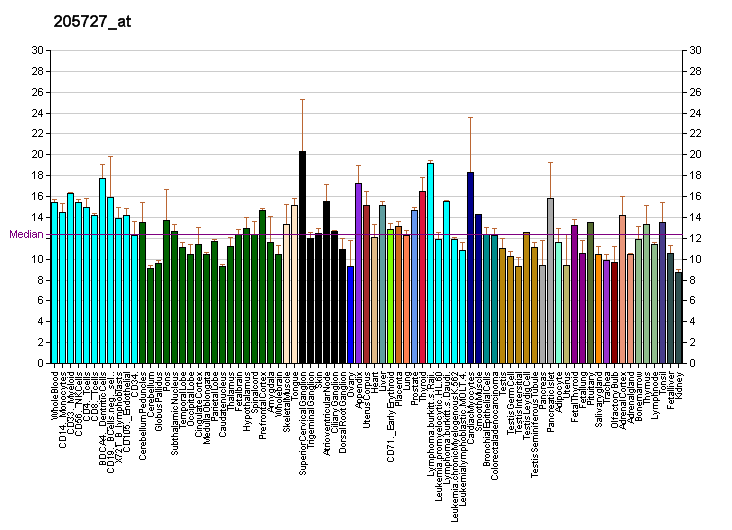
RNA expression pattern
Bgee	Human / Mouse (ortholog); Top expressed in: monocyte; mucosa of transverse colon; jejunal mucosa; epithelium of colon; rectum; granulocyte; duodenum; spleen; lymph node; tonsil / Top expressed in: duodenum; intestinal villus; Ileal epithelium; jejunum; large intestine; colon; crypt of lieberkuhn of small intestine; stroma of bone marrow; Paneth cell; lumbar spinal ganglion; More reference expression data
BioGPS	More reference expression data
Gene ontology
Molecular function	ATP binding; p53 binding; nucleotide binding; enzyme binding; telomerase RNA binding; telomerase activity; RNA binding
Cellular component	telomere; telomerase holoenzyme complex; nucleus; cytoplasm; nuclear matrix; chromosome; U5 snRNP; precatalytic spliceosome; catalytic step 2 spliceosome; ribonucleoprotein complex
Biological process	telomere maintenance via recombination; RNA-dependent DNA biosynthetic process; RNA splicing
Sources:Amigo / QuickGO
Orthologs
Databases	NCBI: entry; OMA: entry
Species	Human	Mouse
Entrez	7011	21745
Ensembl	ENSG00000129566	ENSMUSG00000006281
UniProt	Q99973	P97499
RefSeq (mRNA)	NM_007110; NM_001319035	NM_009351
RefSeq (protein)	NP_001305964; NP_009041	NP_033377
Location (UCSC)	Chr 14: 20.37 – 20.41 Mb	Chr 14: 51.06 – 51.11 Mb
PubMed search
- Wikidata
View/Edit Human	View/Edit Mouse

Telomerase protein component 1 is a ncRNA binding protein that in humans is encoded by the TEP1 gene.

== Function ==
This gene product is a component of the ribonucleoprotein complex responsible for telomerase activity which catalyzes the addition of new telomeres on the chromosome ends. The telomerase-associated proteins are conserved from ciliates to humans. It is also a minor vault protein.
