= PARP4 =

Enzyme

Identifiers
- Aliases: PARP4, ADPRTL1, ARTD4, PARP-4, PARPL, PH5P, VAULT3, VPARP, VWA5C, p193, poly(ADP-ribose) polymerase family member 4
- External IDs: OMIM: 607519; MGI: 2685589; GeneCards: PARP4

Gene location (Human)
Chr.	Chromosome 13 (human)
Band	13q12.12	Start	24,420,931 bp
Band	13q12.12	End	24,512,778 bp

Gene location (Mouse)
Chr.	Chromosome 14 (mouse)
Band	14|14 C3	Start	56,813,076 bp
Band	14|14 C3	End	56,897,251 bp
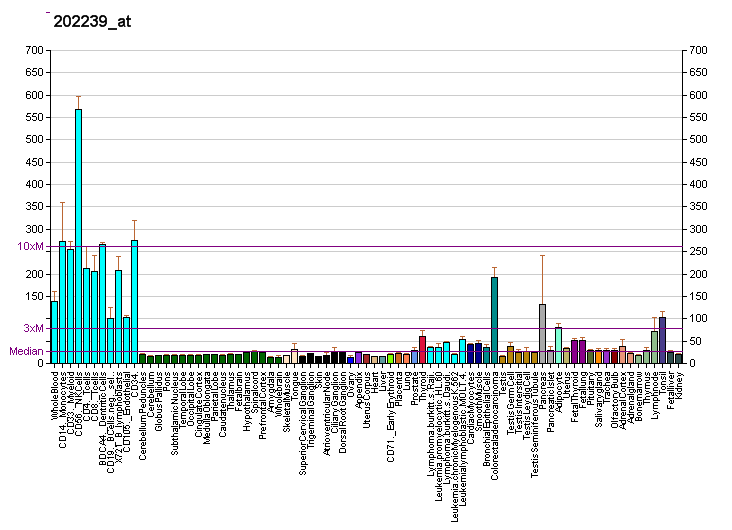
RNA expression pattern
Bgee	Human / Mouse (ortholog); Top expressed in: rectum; duodenum; monocyte; gallbladder; bone marrow cell; blood; islet of Langerhans; transverse colon; Achilles tendon; endometrium / Top expressed in: lumbar spinal ganglion; granulocyte; gastrula; transitional epithelium of urinary bladder; duodenum; muscle of thigh; spleen; zygote; conjunctival fornix; thymus; More reference expression data
BioGPS	More reference expression data
Gene ontology
Molecular function	transferase activity; DNA binding; glycosyltransferase activity; protein binding; enzyme binding; NAD+ ADP-ribosyltransferase activity; protein ADP-ribosylase activity
Cellular component	cytoplasm; membrane; spindle; spindle microtubule; extracellular exosome; cytoskeleton; nucleus; cytosol; ribonucleoprotein complex
Biological process	protein ADP-ribosylation; cell death; cellular response to DNA damage stimulus; inflammatory response; DNA repair; regulation of telomerase activity; transport; protein mono-ADP-ribosylation
Sources:Amigo / QuickGO
Orthologs
Databases	NCBI: entry; OMA: entry
Species	Human	Mouse
Entrez	143	328417
Ensembl	ENSG00000102699	ENSMUSG00000054509
UniProt	Q9UKK3	E9PYK3
RefSeq (mRNA)	NM_006437	NM_001145978
RefSeq (protein)	NP_006428	NP_001139450
Location (UCSC)	Chr 13: 24.42 – 24.51 Mb	Chr 14: 56.81 – 56.9 Mb
PubMed search
- Wikidata
View/Edit Human	View/Edit Mouse

Poly [ADP-ribose] polymerase 4 is an enzyme that in humans is encoded by the PARP4 gene.

This gene encodes poly(ADP-ribosyl)transferase-like 1 protein, which is capable of catalyzing a poly(ADP-ribosyl)ation reaction. This protein has a catalytic domain which is homologous to that of poly (ADP-ribosyl) transferase, but lacks an N-terminal DNA binding domain which activates the C-terminal catalytic domain of poly (ADP-ribosyl) transferase. Since this protein is not capable of binding DNA directly, its transferase activity may be activated by other factors such as protein-protein interaction mediated by the extensive carboxyl terminus.

== Interactions ==
PARP4 has been shown to interact with major vault protein.
