= Fungal DNA barcoding =

Identification of fungal species thanks to specific DNA sequences

Fungal DNA barcoding is the process of identifying species of the biological kingdom Fungi through the PCR amplification and sequencing of specific DNA sequences and their comparison with sequences deposited in a DNA barcode database such as the ISHAM reference database, or the Barcode of Life Data System (BOLD). In this attempt, DNA barcoding relies on universal genes that are ideally present in all fungi with the same degree of sequence variation. The interspecific variation, i.e., the variation between species, in the chosen DNA barcode gene should exceed the intraspecific (within-species) variation.

A fundamental problem in fungal systematics is the existence of teleomorphic and anamorphic stages in their life cycles. These morphs usually differ drastically in their phenotypic appearance, preventing a straightforward association of the asexual anamorph with the sexual teleomorph. Moreover, fungal species can comprise multiple strains that can vary in their morphology or in traits such as carbon- and nitrogen utilisation, which has often led to their description as different species, eventually producing long lists of synonyms. Fungal DNA barcoding can help to identify and associate anamorphic and teleomorphic stages of fungi, and through that to reduce the confusing multitude of fungus names. For this reason, mycologists were among the first to spearhead the investigation of species discrimination by means of DNA sequences, at least 10 years earlier than the DNA barcoding proposal for animals by Paul D. N. Hebert and colleagues in 2003, who popularised the term "DNA barcoding".

The success of identification of fungi by means of DNA barcode sequences stands and falls with the quantitative (completeness) and qualitative (level of identification) aspect of the reference database. Without a database covering a broad taxonomic range of fungi, many identification queries will not result in a satisfyingly close match. Likewise, without a substantial curatorial effort to maintain the records at a high taxonomic level of identification, queries – even when they might have a close or exact match in the reference database – will not be informative if the closest match is only identified to phylum or class level.

Another crucial prerequisite for DNA barcoding is the ability to unambiguously trace the provenance of DNA barcode data back to the originally sampled specimen, the so-called voucher specimen. This is common practice in biology along with the description of new taxa, where the voucher specimens, on which the taxonomic description is based, become the type specimens. When the identity of a certain taxon (or a genetic sequence in the case of DNA barcoding) is in doubt, the original specimen can be re-examined to review and ideally solve the issue. Voucher specimens should be clearly labelled as such, including a permanent voucher identifier that unambiguously connects the specimen with the DNA barcode data derived from it. Furthermore, these voucher specimens should be deposited in publicly accessible repositories like scientific collections or herbaria to preserve them for future reference and to facilitate research involving the deposited specimens.

== Barcode DNA markers ==
=== Internal Transcribed Spacer (ITS) – the primary fungal barcode ===
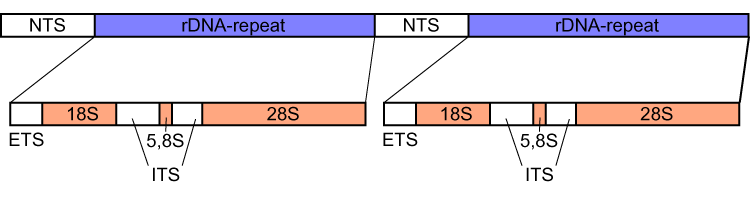
Tandem repeats of the eukaryotic rDNA gene cluster containing the genetic sequences for the 18S, 5.8S, and 28S subunits of the ribosome. ETS – external transcribed spacer, ITS – internal transcribed spacers 1 and 2, numbered from 5' end; NTS – nontranscribed spacer.

In fungi, the Internal transcribed spacer (ITS) is a roughly 600 base pairs long region in the ribosomal tandem repeat gene cluster of the nuclear genome. The region is flanked by the DNA sequences for the ribosomal small subunit (SSU) or 18S subunit at the 5' end, and by the large subunit (LSU) or 28S subunit at the 3' end. The Internal Transcribed Spacer itself consists of two parts, ITS1 and ITS2, which are separated from each other by the 5.8S subunit nested between them. Like the flanking 18S and 28S subunits, the 5.8S subunit contains a highly conserved DNA sequence, as they code for structural parts of the ribosome, which is a key component in intracellular protein synthesis.

Due to several advantages of ITS (see below) and a comprehensive amount of sequence data accumulated in the 1990s and early 2000s, Begerow et al. (2010) and Schoch et al. (2012) proposed the ITS region as primary DNA barcode region for the genetic identification of fungi.

UNITE is an open ITS barcoding database for fungi and all other eukaryotes.

==== Primers ====
The conserved flanking regions of 18S and 28S serve as anchor points for the primers used for PCR amplification of the ITS region. Moreover, the conserved nested 5.8S region allows for the construction of "internal" primers, i.e., primers attaching to complementary sequences within the ITS region. White et al. (1990) proposed such internal primers, named ITS2 and ITS3, along with the flanking primers ITS1 and ITS4 in the 18S and the 28S subunit, respectively. Due to their almost universal applicability to ITS sequencing in fungi, these primers are still in wide use today. Optimised primers specifically for ITS sequencing in Dikarya (comprising Basidiomycota and Ascomycota) have been proposed by Toju et al. (2012).

For the majority of fungi, the ITS primers proposed by White et al. (1990) have become the standard primers used for PCR amplification (with the most common pairing being ITS1 + ITS4). These primers are as follows:

Forward primers:

- ITS1: 5'-TCCGTAGGTGAACCTGCGG-3'
- ITS2: 5'-GCTGCGTTCTTCCATCGATGC-3'
- ITS5: 5'-GGAAGTAAAAGTCGTAACAAG G-3'

Reverse primers:

- ITS3: 5'-GCATCGATGAAGAACGCAGC-3'
- ITS4: 5'-TCCTCCGCTTATTGATATGC-3'

==== Advantages and shortcomings ====
A major advantage of using the ITS region as molecular marker and fungal DNA barcode is that the entire ribosomal gene cluster is arranged in tandem repeats, i.e., in multiple copies. This allows for its PCR amplification and Sanger sequencing even from small material samples (given the DNA is not fragmented due to age or other degenerative influences). Hence, a high PCR success rate is usually observed when amplifying ITS. However, this success rate varies greatly among fungal groups, from 65% in non-Dikarya (including the now paraphyletic Mucoromycotina, the Chytridiomycota and the Blastocladiomycota) to 100% in Saccharomycotina and Basidiomycota (with the exception of very low success in Pucciniomycotina). Furthermore, the choice of primers for ITS amplification can introduce biases towards certain taxonomic fungus groups. For example, the "universal" ITS primers fail to amplify about 10% of the tested fungal specimens.

The tandem repeats of the ribosomal gene cluster cause the problem of significant intragenomic sequence heterogeneity observed among ITS copies of several fungal groups. In Sanger sequencing, this will cause ITS sequence reads of different lengths to superpose each other, potentially rendering the resulting chromatograph unreadable. Furthermore, because of the non-coding nature of the ITS region that can lead to a substantial amount of indels, it is impossible to consistently align ITS sequences from highly divergent species for further bigger-scale phylogenetic analyses. The degree of intragenomic sequence heterogeneity can be investigated in more detail through molecular cloning of the initially PCR-amplified ITS sequences, followed by sequencing of the clones. This procedure of initial PCR amplification, followed by cloning of the amplicons and finally sequencing of the cloned PCR products is the most common approach of obtaining ITS sequences for DNA metabarcoding of environmental samples, in which a multitude of different fungal species can be present simultaneously. However, this approach of sequencing after cloning was rarely done for the ITS sequences that make up the reference libraries used for DNA barcode-aided identification, thus potentially giving an underestimate of the existing ITS sequence variation in many samples.

The weighted arithmetic mean of the intraspecific (within-species) ITS variability among fungi is 2.51%. This variability, however, can range from 0% for example in Serpula lacrymans (n=93 samples) over 0.19% in Tuber melanosporum (n=179) up to 15.72% in Rhizoctonia solani (n=608), or even 24.75% in Pisolithus tinctorius (n=113). In cases of high intraspecific ITS variability, the application of a threshold of 3% sequence variability – a canonical upper value for intraspecific variation – will therefore lead to a higher estimate of operational taxonomic units (OTUs), i.e., putative species, than there actually are in a sample. In the case of medically relevant fungal species, a more strict threshold of 2.5% ITS variability allows only around 75% of all species to be accurately identified to the species level.

On the other hand, morphologically well-defined, but evolutionarily young species complexes or sibling species may only differ (if at all) in a few nucleotides of the ITS sequences. Solely relying on ITS barcode data for the identification of such species pairs or complexes may thus obscure the actual diversity and might lead to misidentification if not accompanied by the investigation of morphological and ecological features and/or comparison of additional diagnostic genetic markers. For some taxa, ITS (or its ITS2 part) is not variable enough as fungal DNA barcode, as for example has been shown in Aspergillus, Cladosporium, Fusarium and Penicillium. Efforts to define a universally applicable threshold value of ITS variability that demarcates intraspecific from interspecific (between-species) variability thus remain futile.

Nonetheless, the probability of correct species identification with the ITS region is high in the Dikarya, and especially so in Basidiomycota, where even the ITS1 part is often sufficient to identify the species. However, its discrimination power is partly superseded by that of the DNA-directed RNA polymerase II subunit RPB1 (see also below).

Due to the shortcomings of ITS-based primary fungal DNA barcoding, the necessity of establishing a second DNA barcode marker was expressed. Several attempts were made to establish other genetic markers that could serve as additional DNA barcodes, similar to the situation in plants, where the plastidial genes rbcL, matK and trnH-psbA, as well as the nuclear ITS are often used in combination for DNA barcoding.

=== Translational elongation factor 1α (TEF1α) – the secondary fungal barcode ===
The translational elongation factor 1α is part of the eukaryotic elongation factor 1 complex, whose main function is to facilitate the elongation of the amino acid chain of a polypeptide during the translation process of gene expression.

Stielow et al. (2015) investigated the TEF1α gene, among a number of others, as potential genetic marker for fungal DNA barcoding. The TEF1α gene coding for the translational elongation factor 1α is generally considered to have a slow mutation rate, and it is therefore generally better suited for investigating older splits deeper in the phylogenetic history of an organism group. Despite this, the authors conclude that TEF1α is the most promising candidate for an additional DNA barcode marker in fungi as it also features sequence regions of higher mutation rates. Following this, a quality-controlled reference database was established and merged with the previously existing ISHAM-ITS database for fungal ITS DNA barcodes to form the ISHAM database.

TEF1α has been successfully used to identify a new species of Cantharellus from Texas and distinguish it from a morphologically similar species. In the genera Ochroconis and Verruconis (Sympoventuriaceae, Venturiales), however, the marker does not allow distinction of all species. TEF1α has also been used in phylogenetic analyses at the genus level, e.g. in the case of Cantharellus and the entomopathogenic Beauveria, and for the phylogenetics of early-diverging fungal lineages.

==== Primers ====
TEF1α primers used in the broad-scale screening of the performance of DNA barcode gene candidates of Stielow et al. (2015) were the forward primer EF1-983F with the sequence 5'-GCYCCYGGHCAYCGTGAYTTYAT-3', and the reverse primer EF1-1567R with the sequence 5'-ACHGTRCCRATACCACCRATCTT-3'. In addition, a number of new primers was developed, with the primer pair in bold resulting in a high average amplification success of 88%:

Forward primers:

- **EF1-1018F**: 5'-GAYTTCATCAAGAACATGAT-3'
- EF1-1002F: 5'-TTCATCAAGAACATGAT-3'
- Al33_alternative_f: 5'-GARTTYGARGCYGGTATCTC-3'
- EF1_alternative_3f: 5'-TTYGARGCYGGTATCTC-3'

Reverse primers:

- **EF1-1620R**: 5'-GACGTTGAADCCRACRTTGTC-3'
- EF1-1688R: 5'-GCTATCATCACAATGGACGTTCTTGGAG-3'
- EF1_alternative_3r: 5'-GAVACRTTCTTGACGTTGAA-3'

Primers used for the investigation of Rhizophydiales and especially Batrachochytrium dendrobatidis, a pathogen of amphibia, are the forward primer tef1F with the nucleotide sequence 5'-TACAARTGYGGTGGTATYGACA-3', and the reverse primer tef1R with the sequence 5'-ACNGACTTGACYTCAGTRGT-3'. These primers also successfully amplified the majority of Cantharellus species investigated by Buyck et al. (2014), with the exception of a few species for which more specific primers were developed: the forward primer tef-1Fcanth with the sequence 5'-AGCATGGGTDCTYGACAAG-3', and the reverse primer tef-1Rcanth with the sequence 5'-CCAATYTTRTAYACATCYTGGAG-3'.

=== D1/D2 domain of the LSU ribosomal RNA ===
The D1/D2 domain is part of the nuclear large subunit (28S) ribosomal RNA, and it is therefore located in the same ribosomal tandem repeat gene cluster as the Internal Transcribed Spacer (ITS). But unlike the non-coding ITS sequences, the D1/D2 domain contains coding sequence. With about 600 base pairs it is about the same nucleotide sequence length as ITS, which makes amplification and sequencing rather straightforward, an advantage that has led to the accumulation of an extensive amount of D1/D2 sequence data especially for yeasts.

Regarding the molecular identification of basidiomycetous yeasts, D1/D2 (or ITS) can be used alone. However, Fell et al. (2000) and Scorzetti et al. (2002) recommend the combined analysis of the D1/D2 and ITS regions, a practice that later became the standard required information for describing new taxa of asco- and basidiomycetous yeasts. When attempting to identify early diverging fungal lineages, the study of Schoch et al. (2012), comparing the identification performance of different genetic markers, showed that the large subunit (as well as the small subunit) of the ribosomal RNA performs better than ITS or RPB1.

==== Primers ====
For basidiomycetous yeasts, the forward primer F63 with the sequence 5'-GCATATCAATAAGCGGAGGAAAAG-3', and the reverse primer LR3 with the sequence 5'-GGTCCGTGTTTCAAGACGG-3' have been successfully used for PCR amplification of the D1/D23 domain. The D1/D2 domain of ascomycetous yeasts like Candida can be amplified with the forward primer NL-1 (same as F63) and the reverse primer NL-4 (same as LR3).

=== RNA polymerase II subunit RPB1 ===
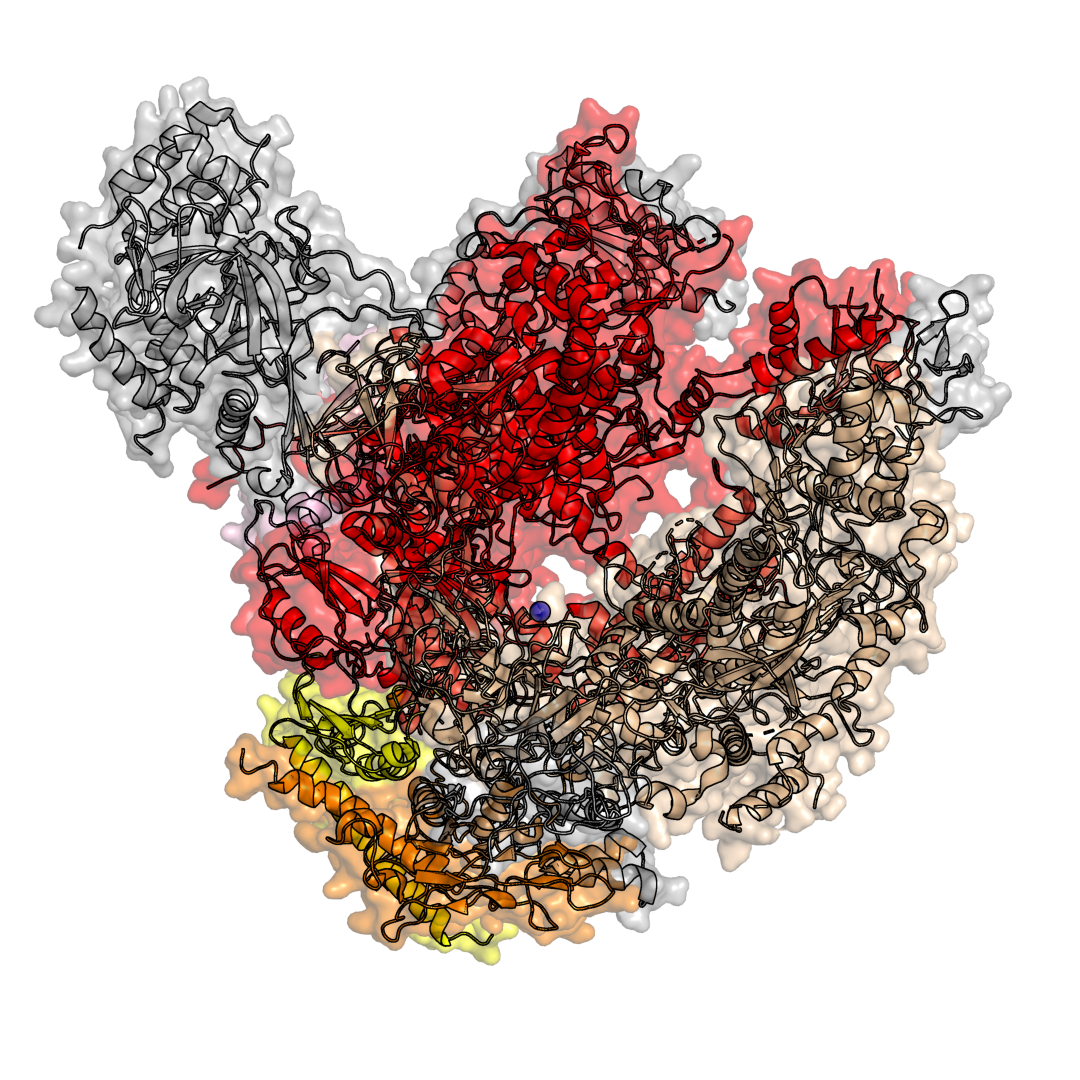
Eukaryotic RNA-polymerase II of Saccharomyces cerevisiae, with the RPB1 subunit coloured in red. Other subunits: RPB3 – orange , RPB11 – yellow , RPB2 – wheat, RPB6 – pink; the remaining seven subunits are in grey colour.

The RNA polymerase II subunit RPB1 is the largest subunit of the RNA polymerase II. In Saccharomyces cerevisiae, it is encoded by the RPO21 gene. PCR amplification success of RPB1 is very taxon-dependent, ranging from 70 to 80% in Ascomycota to 14% in early diverging fungal lineages. Apart from the early diverging lineages, RPB1 has a high rate of species identification in all fungal groups. In the species-rich Pezizomycotina it even outperforms ITS.

In a study comparing the identification performance of four genes, RPB1 was among the most effective genes when combining two genes in the analysis: combined analysis with either ITS or with the large subunit ribosomal RNA yielded the highest identification success.

Other studies also used RPB2, the second-largest subunit of the RNA polymerase II, e.g. for studying the phylogenetic relationships among species of the genus Cantharellus or for a phylogenetic study shedding light on the relationships among early-diverging lineages in the fungal kingdom.

==== Primers ====
Primers successfully amplifying RPB1 especially in Ascomycota are the forward primer RPB1-Af with the sequence 5'-GARTGYCCDGGDCAYTTYGG-3', and the reverse primer RPB1-Ac-RPB1-Cr with the sequence 5'-CCNGCDATNTCRTTRTCCATRTA-3'.

=== Intergenic Spacer (IGS) of ribosomal RNA genes ===
The Intergenic Spacer (IGS) is the region of non-coding DNA between individual tandem repeats of the ribosomal gene cluster in the nuclear genome, as opposed to the Internal Transcribed Spacer (ITS) that is situated within these tandem repeats.

IGS has been successfully used for the differentiation of strains of Xanthophyllomyces dendrorhous as well as for species distinction in the psychrophilic genus Mrakia (Cystofilobasidiales). Due to these results, IGS has been recommended as a genetic marker for additional differentiation (along with D1/D2 and ITS) of closely related species and even strains within one species in basidiomycete yeasts.

The recent discovery of additional non-coding RNA genes in the IGS region of some basidiomycetes cautions against uncritical use of IGS sequences for DNA barcoding and phylogenetic purposes.

=== Other genetic markers ===
The cytochrome c oxidase subunit I (COI) gene outperforms ITS in DNA barcoding of Penicillium (Ascomycota) species, with species-specific barcodes for 66% of the investigated species versus 25% in the case of ITS. Furthermore, a part of the β-Tubulin A (BenA) gene exhibits a higher taxonomic resolution in distinguishing Penicillium species as compared to COI and ITS. In the closely related Aspergillus niger complex, however, COI is not variable enough for species discrimination. In Fusarium, COI exhibits paralogues in many cases, and homologous copies are not variable enough to distinguish species.

COI also performs poorly in the identification of basidiomycote rusts of the order Pucciniales due to the presence of introns. Even when the obstacle of introns is overcome, ITS and the LSU rRNA (28S) outperform COI as DNA barcode marker. In the subdivision Agaricomycotina, PCR amplification success was poor for COI, even with multiple primer combinations. Successfully sequenced COI samples also included introns and possible paralogous copies, as reported for Fusarium. Agaricus bisporus was found to contain up to 19 introns, making the COI gene of this species the longest recorded, with 29,902 nucleotides. Apart from the substantial troubles of sequencing COI, COI and ITS generally perform equally well in distinguishing basidiomycete mushrooms.

Topoisomerase I (TOP1) was investigated as additional DNA barcode candidate by Lewis et al. (2011) based on proteome data, with the developed universal primer pair being subsequently tested on actual samples by Stielow et al. (2015). The forward primer TOP1_501-F with the sequence 5'-TGTAAAACGACGGCCAGT-ACGAT-ACTGCCAAGGTTTTCCGTACHTACAACGC-3' (where the first section marks the universal M13 forward primer tail, the second part consisting of ACGAT a spacer, and the third part the actual primer) and reverse the primer TOP1_501-R with 5'-CAGGAAACAGCTATGA-CCCAGTCCTCGTCAACWGACTTRATRGCCCA-3' (the first section marking the universal M13 reverse primer tail, the second part the actual TOP1 reverse primer) amplify a fragment of approximately 800 base pairs.

TOP1 was found to be a promising DNA barcode candidate marker for ascomycetes, where it can distinguish species in Fusarium and Penicillium – genera, in which the primary ITS barcode performs poorly. However, poor amplification success with the TOP1 universal primers is observed in early-diverging fungal lineages and basidiomycetes except Pucciniomycotina (where ITS PCR success is poor).

Like TOP1, the Phosphoglycerate kinase (PGK) was among the genetic markers investigated by Lewis et al. (2011) and Stielow et al. (2015) as potential additional fungal DNA barcodes. A number of universal primers was developed, with the PGK533 primer pair, amplifying a circa 1,000 base pair fragment, being the most successful in most fungi except Basidiomycetes. Like TOP1, PGK is superior to ITS in species differentiation in ascomycete genera like Penicillium and Fusarium, and both PGK and TOP1 perform as good as TEF1α in distinguishing closely related species in these genera.

== Applications ==
=== Food safety ===
A citizen science project investigated the consensus between the labelling of dried, commercially sold mushrooms and the DNA barcoding results from these mushrooms. All samples were found to be correctly labelled. However, an obstacle was the unreliability of ITS reference databases in terms of the level of identification, as the two databases (GenBank and UNITE) used for ITS sequence comparison gave different identification results in some of the samples.

Correct labelling of mushrooms intended for consumption was also investigated by Raja et al. (2016), who used the ITS region for DNA barcoding from dried mushrooms, mycelium powders, and dietary supplement capsules. In only 30% of the 33 samples did the product label correctly state the binomial fungus name. In another 30%, the genus name was correct, but the species epithet did not match, and in 15% of the cases not even the genus name of the binomial name given on the product label matched the result of the obtained ITS barcode. For the remaining 25% of the samples, no ITS sequence could be obtained.

Xiang et al. (2013) showed that using ITS sequences, the commercially highly valuable the caterpillar fungus Ophiocordyceps sinensis and its counterfeit versions (O. nutans, O. robertsii, Cordyceps cicadae, C. gunnii, C. militaris, and the plant Ligularia hodgsonii) can be reliably identified to the species level.

=== Pathogenic fungi ===
A study by Vi Hoang et al. (2019) focused on the identification accuracy of pathogenic fungi using both the primary (ITS) and secondary (TEF1α) barcode markers. Their results show that in Diutina (a segregate of Candida) and Pichia, species identification is straightforward with either the ITS or the TEF1α as well as with a combination of both. In the Lodderomyces assemblage, which contains three of the five most common pathogenic Candida species (C. albicans, C. dubliniensis, and C. parapsilosis), ITS failed to distinguish Candida orthopsilosis and C. parapsilosis, which are part of the Candida parapsilosis complex of closely related species. TEF1α, on the other hand, allowed identification of all investigated species of the Lodderomyces clade. Similar results were obtained for Scedosporium species, which are attributed to a wide range of localised to invasive diseases: ITS could not distinguish between S. apiospermum and S. boydii, whereas with TEF1α all investigated species of this genus could be accurately identified. This study therefore underlines the usefulness of applying more than one DNA barcoding marker for fungal species identification.

=== Conservation of cultural heritage ===
Fungal DNA barcoding has been successfully applied to the investigation of foxing phenomena, a major concern in the conservation of paper documents. Sequeira et al. (2019) sequenced ITS from foxing stains and found Chaetomium globosum, Ch. murorum, Ch. nigricolor, Chaetomium sp., Eurotium rubrum, Myxotrichum deflexum, Penicillium chrysogenum, P. citrinum, P. commune, Penicillium sp. and Stachybotrys chartarum to inhabit the investigated paper stains.

Another study investigated fungi that act as biodeteriorating agents in the Old Cathedral of Coimbra, part of the University of Coimbra, a UNESCO World Heritage Site. Sequencing the ITS barcode of ten samples with classical Sanger as well as with Illumina next-generation sequencing techniques, they identified 49 fungal species. Aspergillus versicolor, Cladosporium cladosporioides, C. sphaerospermum, C. tenuissimum, Epicoccum nigrum, Parengyodontium album, Penicillium brevicompactum, P. crustosum, P. glabrum, Talaromyces amestolkiae and T. stollii were the most common species isolated from the samples.

Another study concerning objects of cultural heritage investigated the fungal diversity on a canvas painting by Paula Rego using the ITS2 subregion of the ITS marker. Altogether, 387 OTUs (putative species) in 117 genera of 13 different classes of fungi were observed.

== See also ==
- DNA barcoding
- Microbial DNA barcoding
- Pollen DNA barcoding
- DNA barcoding in diet assessment
- Consortium for the Barcode of Life
