= Ribosomal RNA =

RNA component of the ribosome, essential for protein synthesis in all living organisms

rRNAs
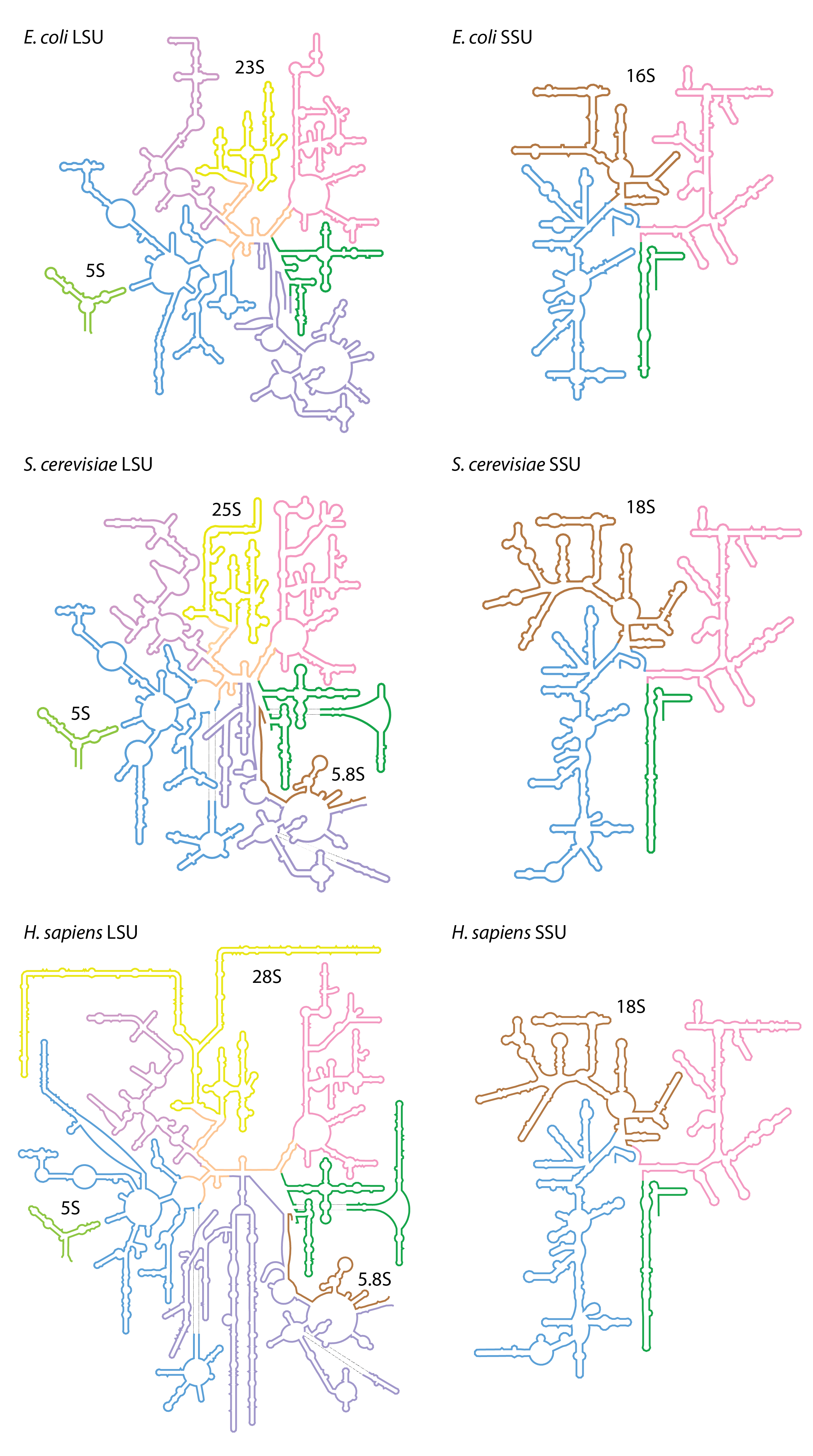
- rRNAs of various species

Identifiers

Other data
- RNA type: Gene; rRNA
- PDB structures: PDBe

Ribosomal ribonucleic acid (rRNA) is a type of non-coding RNA which is the primary component of ribosomes, essential to all cells. rRNA is a ribozyme which carries out protein synthesis in ribosomes. Ribosomal RNA is transcribed from ribosomal DNA (rDNA) and then bound to ribosomal proteins to form small and large ribosome subunits. rRNA is the physical and mechanical factor of the ribosome that forces transfer RNA (tRNA) and messenger RNA (mRNA) to process and translate the latter into proteins. Ribosomal RNA is the predominant form of RNA found in most cells; it makes up about 80% of cellular RNA despite never being translated into proteins itself. Ribosomes are composed of approximately 60% rRNA and 40% ribosomal proteins, though this ratio differs between prokaryotes and eukaryotes.

== Structure ==
Although the primary structure of rRNA sequences can vary across organisms, base-pairing within these sequences commonly forms stem-loop configurations. The length and position of these rRNA stem-loops allow them to create three-dimensional rRNA structures that are similar across species. Because of these configurations, rRNA can form tight and specific interactions with ribosomal proteins to form ribosomal subunits. These ribosomal proteins contain basic residues (as opposed to acidic residues) and aromatic residues (i.e. phenylalanine, tyrosine and tryptophan) allowing them to form chemical interactions with their associated RNA regions, such as stacking interactions. Ribosomal proteins can also cross-link to the sugar-phosphate backbone of rRNA with binding sites that consist of basic residues (i.e. lysine and arginine). All ribosomal proteins (including the specific sequences that bind to rRNA) have been identified. These interactions along with the association of the small and large ribosomal subunits result in a functioning ribosome capable of synthesizing proteins.

An example of a fully-assembled small subunit of ribosomal RNA in prokaryotes, specifically Thermus thermophilus. The actual ribosomal RNA (16S) is shown coiled in orange with ribosomal proteins attaching in blue.

Ribosomal RNA organizes into two types of major ribosomal subunit: the large subunit (LSU) and the small subunit (SSU). One of each type come together to form a functioning ribosome. The subunits are at times referred to by their size-sedimentation measurements (a number with an "S" suffix). In prokaryotes, the LSU and SSU are called the 50S and 30S subunits, respectively. In eukaryotes, they are a little larger; the LSU and SSU of eukaryotes are termed the 60S and 40S subunits, respectively.

In the ribosomes of prokaryotes such as bacteria, the SSU contains a single small rRNA molecule (~1500 nucleotides) while the LSU contains one single small rRNA and a single large rRNA molecule (~3000 nucleotides). These are combined with ~50 ribosomal proteins to form ribosomal subunits. There are three types of rRNA found in prokaryotic ribosomes: 23S and 5S rRNA in the LSU and 16S rRNA in the SSU.

In the ribosomes of eukaryotes such as humans, the SSU contains a single small rRNA (~1800 nucleotides) while the LSU contains two small rRNAs and one molecule of large rRNA (~5000 nucleotides). Eukaryotic rRNA has over 70 ribosomal proteins which interact to form larger and more polymorphic ribosomal units in comparison to prokaryotes. There are four types of rRNA in eukaryotes: 3 species in the LSU and 1 in the SSU. Yeast has been the traditional model for observation of eukaryotic rRNA behavior and processes, leading to a deficit in diversification of research. It has only been within the last decade that technical advances (specifically in the field of Cryo-EM) have allowed for preliminary investigation into ribosomal behavior in other eukaryotes. In yeast, the LSU contains the 5S, 5.8S and 28S rRNAs. The combined 5.8S and 28S are roughly equivalent in size and function to the prokaryotic 23S rRNA subtype, minus expansion segments (ESs) that are localized to the surface of the ribosome which were thought to occur only in eukaryotes. However recently, the Asgard phyla, namely, Lokiarchaeota and Heimdallarchaeota, considered the closest archaeal relatives to Eukarya, were reported to possess two supersized ESs in their 23S rRNAs. Likewise, the 5S rRNA contains a 108‐nucleotide insertion in the ribosomes of the halophilic archaeon Halococcus morrhuae.

A eukaryotic SSU contains the 18S rRNA subunit, which also contains ESs. SSU ESs are generally smaller than LSU ESs.

SSU and LSU rRNA sequences are widely used for study of evolutionary relationships among organisms, since they are of ancient origin, are found in all known forms of life and are resistant to horizontal gene transfer. rRNA sequences are conserved (unchanged) over time due to their crucial role in the function of the ribosome. Phylogenic information derived from the 16s rRNA is currently used as the main method of delineation between similar prokaryotic species by calculating nucleotide similarity. The canonical tree of life is the lineage of the translation system.

LSU rRNA subtypes have been called ribozymes because ribosomal proteins cannot bind to the catalytic site of the ribosome in this area (specifically the peptidyl transferase center, or PTC).

The SSU rRNA subtypes decode mRNA in its decoding center (DC). Ribosomal proteins cannot enter the DC.

The structure of rRNA is able to drastically change to affect tRNA binding to the ribosome during translation of other mRNAs. In 16S rRNA, this is thought to occur when certain nucleotides in the rRNA appear to alternate base pairing between one nucleotide or another, forming a "switch" that alters the rRNA's conformation. This process is able to affect the structure of the LSU and SSU, suggesting that this conformational switch in the rRNA structure affects the entire ribosome in its ability to match a codon with its anticodon in tRNA selection as well as decode mRNA.

=== Assembly ===
Ribosomal RNA's integration and assembly into ribosomes begins with their folding, modification, processing and assembly with ribosomal proteins to form the two ribosomal subunits, the LSU and the SSU. In Prokaryotes, rRNA incorporation occurs in the cytoplasm due to the lack of membrane-bound organelles. In Eukaryotes, however, this process primarily takes place in the nucleolus and is initiated by the synthesis of pre-RNA. This requires the presence of all three RNA polymerases. In fact, the transcription of pre-RNA by RNA polymerase I accounts for about 60% of cell's total cellular RNA transcription. This is followed by the folding of the pre-RNA so that it can be assembled with ribosomal proteins. This folding is catalyzed by endo- and exonucleases, RNA helicases, GTPases and ATPases. The rRNA subsequently undergoes endo- and exonucleolytic processing to remove external and internal transcribed spacers. The pre-RNA then undergoes modifications such as methylation or pseudouridinylation before ribosome assembly factors and ribosomal proteins assemble with the pre-RNA to form pre-ribosomal particles. Upon going under more maturation steps and subsequent exit from the nucleolus into the cytoplasm, these particles combine to form the ribosomes. The basic and aromatic residues found within the primary structure of rRNA allow for favorable stacking interactions and attraction to ribosomal proteins, creating a cross-linking effect between the backbone of rRNA and other components of the ribosomal unit.

== Function ==
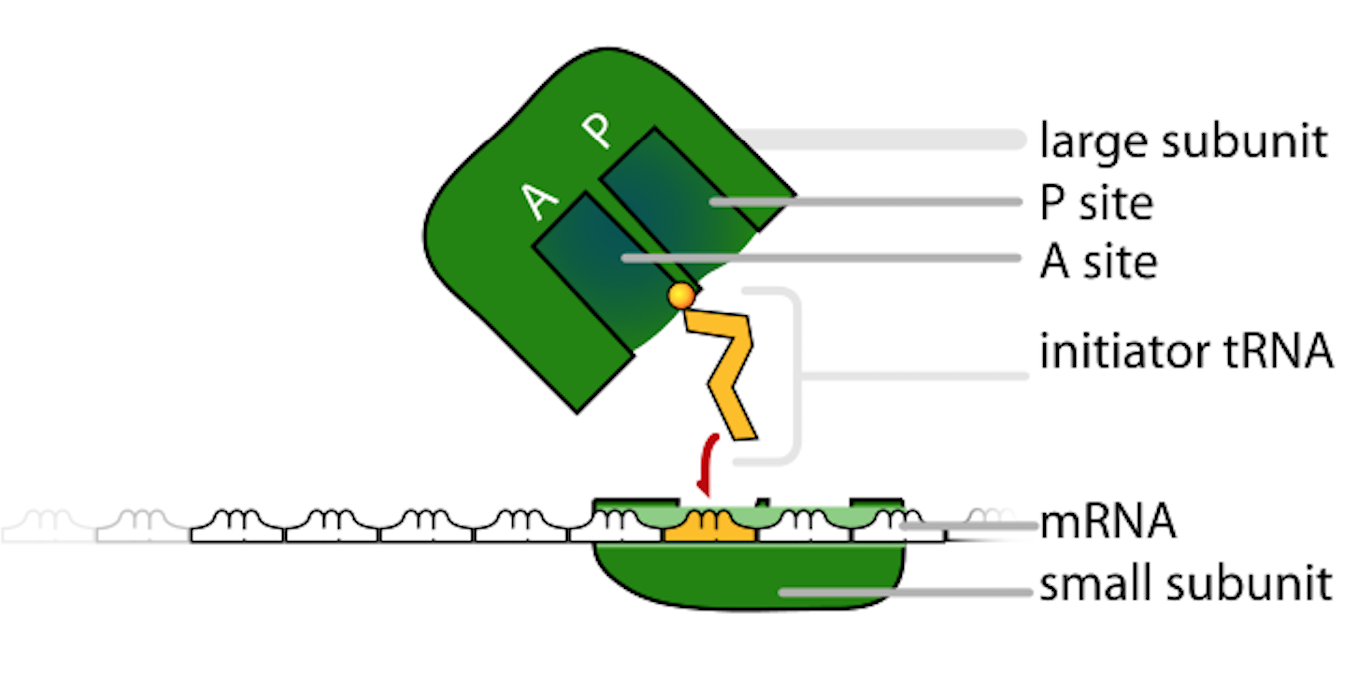
A simplified depiction of a ribosome (with SSU and LSU artificially detached here for visualization purposes) depicting the A and P sites and both the small and large ribosomal subunits operating in conjunction.

Ribosomal RNA (rRNA) contains highly conserved secondary structural elements that are shared across diverse species, indicating that these sequences are among the most ancient and evolutionarily conserved components of living organisms. rRNA plays a fundamental role in protein synthesis by forming the structural and catalytic core of the ribosome. During translation, rRNA facilitates the interaction between messenger RNA (mRNA) and transfer RNA (tRNA), ensuring accurate decoding of the genetic code into amino acid sequences. Within the small ribosomal subunit (SSU), rRNA binds the mRNA and aligns it with the anticodon of the tRNA. In the large ribosomal subunit (LSU), rRNA interacts with the amino acid acceptor end of the tRNA and catalyzes peptide bond formation, transferring the growing polypeptide chain from one tRNA to the next. This catalytic activity is mediated by specific rRNA stem-loop structures that create functional binding regions within the ribosome. The ribosome contains three major tRNA-binding sites: the aminoacyl (A) site, where incoming charged tRNAs bind; the peptidyl (P) site, which holds the tRNA carrying the growing polypeptide chain; and the exit (E) site, through which uncharged tRNAs leave the ribosome after peptide transfer:

- In general, the A (aminoacyl) site contains an aminoacyl-tRNA (a tRNA esterified to an amino acid on the 3' end).
- The P (peptidyl) site contains a tRNA esterified to the nascent peptide. The free amino (NH_{2}) group of the A site tRNA attacks the ester linkage of P site tRNA, causing transfer of the nascent peptide to the amino acid in the A site. This reaction is takes place in the peptidyl transferase center
- The E (exit) site contains a tRNA that has been discharged, with a free 3' end (with no amino acid or nascent peptide).

A single mRNA can be translated simultaneously by multiple ribosomes. This is called a polysome.

In prokaryotes, much work has been done to further identify the importance of rRNA in translation of mRNA. For example, it has been found that the A site consists primarily of 16S rRNA. Apart from various protein elements that interact with tRNA at this site, it is hypothesized that if these proteins were removed without altering ribosomal structure, the site would continue to function normally. In the P site, through the observation of crystal structures it has been shown the 3' end of 16s rRNA can fold into the site as if a molecule of mRNA. This results in intermolecular interactions that stabilize the subunits. Similarly, like the A site, the P site primarily contains rRNA with few proteins. The peptidyl transferase center, for example, is formed by nucleotides from the 23S rRNA subunit. In fact, studies have shown that the peptidyl transferase center contains no proteins, and is entirely initiated by the presence of rRNA. Unlike the A and P sites, the E site contains more proteins. Because proteins are not essential for the functioning of the A and P sites, the E site molecular composition shows that it is perhaps evolved later. In primitive ribosomes, it is likely that tRNAs exited from the P site. Additionally, it has been shown that E-site tRNA bind with both the 16S and 23S rRNA subunits.

== Subunits and associated ribosomal RNA ==
Diagram of ribosomal RNA types and how they combine to create the ribosomal subunits.

Both prokaryotic and eukaryotic ribosomes can be broken down into two subunits, one large and one small. The exemplary species used in the table below for their respective rRNAs are the bacterium Escherichia coli (prokaryote) and human (eukaryote). Note that "nt" represents the length of the rRNA type in nucleotides and the "S" (such as in "16S) represents Svedberg units.

Type	Size	Large subunit (LSU rRNA)	Small subunit (SSU rRNA)
prokaryotic	70S	50S (5S : 120 nt, 23S : 2906 nt)	30S (16S : 1542 nt)
eukaryotic (nuclear)	80S	60S (5S : 121 nt, 5.8S : 156 nt, 28S : 5070 nt)	40S (18S : 1869 nt)
eukaryotic (mitochondrial)	55S	39S 16S (Mitochondrially encoded 16S rRNA : approx. 1,571 nt)	28S 12S (Mitochondrially encoded 12S rRNA : approx. 955 nt)

S units of the subunits (or the rRNAs) cannot simply be added because they represent measures of sedimentation rate rather than of mass. The sedimentation rate of each subunit is affected by its shape, as well as by its mass. The nt units can be added as these represent the integer number of units in the linear rRNA polymers (for example, the total length of the human rRNA = 7216 nt).

Gene clusters coding for rRNA are commonly called "ribosomal DNA" or rDNA (note that the term seems to imply that ribosomes contain DNA, which is not the case).

=== In prokaryotes ===
In prokaryotes a small 30S ribosomal subunit contains the 16S ribosomal RNA. The large 50S ribosomal subunit contains two rRNA species (the 5S and 23S ribosomal RNAs). Therefore it can be deduced that in both bacteria and archaea there is one rRNA gene that codes for all three rRNA types :16S, 23S and 5S.

Bacterial 16S ribosomal RNA, 23S ribosomal RNA, and 5S rRNA genes are typically organized as a co-transcribed operon. As shown by the image in this section, there is an internal transcribed spacer between 16S and 23S rRNA genes. There may be one or more copies of the operon dispersed in the genome (for example, Escherichia coli has seven). Typically in bacteria there are between one and fifteen copies.

Archaea contains either a single rRNA gene operon or up to four copies of the same operon.

The 3' end of the 16S ribosomal RNA (in a ribosome) recognizes a sequence on the 5' end of mRNA called the Shine-Dalgarno sequence.

=== In eukaryotes ===
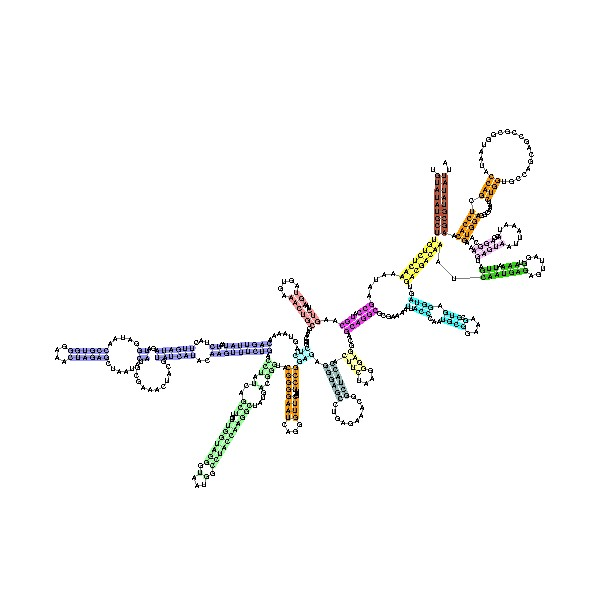
Small subunit ribosomal RNA, 5' domain taken from the Rfam database. This example is RF00177, a fragment from an uncultured bacterium.

In contrast, eukaryotes generally have many copies of the rRNA genes organized in tandem repeats. In humans, approximately 300–400 repeats are present in five clusters, located on chromosomes 13 (RNR1), 14 (RNR2), 15 (RNR3), 21 (RNR4) and 22 (RNR5). Diploid humans have 10 clusters of genomic rDNA which in total make up less than 0.5% of the human genome.

It was previously accepted that repeat rDNA sequences were identical and served as redundancies or failsafes to account for natural replication errors and point mutations. However, sequence variation in rDNA (and subsequently rRNA) in humans across multiple chromosomes has been observed, both within and between human individuals. Many of these variations are palindromic sequences and potential errors due to replication. Certain variants are also expressed in a tissue-specific manner in mice.

Mammalian cells have 2 mitochondrial (12S and 16S) rRNA molecules and 4 types of cytoplasmic rRNA (the 28S, 5.8S, 18S, and 5S subunits). The 28S, 5.8S, and 18S rRNAs are encoded by a single transcription unit (45S) separated by 2 internally transcribed spacers. The first spacer corresponds to the one found in bacteria and archaea, and the other spacer is an insertion into what was the 23S rRNA in prokaryotes. The 45S rDNA is organized into 5 clusters (each has 30–40 repeats) on chromosomes 13, 14, 15, 21, and 22. These are transcribed by RNA polymerase I. The DNA for the 5S subunit occurs in tandem arrays (~200–300 true 5S genes and many dispersed pseudogenes), the largest one on the chromosome 1q41-42. 5S rRNA is transcribed by RNA polymerase III. The 18S rRNA in most eukaryotes is in the small ribosomal subunit, and the large subunit contains three rRNA species (the 5S, 5.8S and 28S in mammals, 25S in plants, rRNAs).

In flies, the large subunit contains four rRNA species instead of three with a split in the 5.8S rRNA that presents a shorter 5.8S subunit (123 nt) and a 30 nucleotide subunit named the 2S rRNA. Both fragments are separated by an internally transcribed spacer of 28 nucleotides. Since the 2S rRNA is small and highly abundant, its presence can interfere with construction of sRNA libraries and compromise the quantification of other sRNAs. The 2S subunit is retrieved in fruit fly and dark-winged fungus gnat species but absent from mosquitoes.

The tertiary structure of the small subunit ribosomal RNA (SSU rRNA) has been resolved by X-ray crystallography. The secondary structure of SSU rRNA contains 4 distinct domains—the 5', central, 3' major and 3' minor domains. A model of the secondary structure for the 5' domain (500-800 nucleotides) is shown.

== Biosynthesis ==
=== In eukaryotes ===
As the building-blocks for the organelle, production of rRNA is ultimately the rate-limiting step in the synthesis of a ribosome. In the nucleolus, rRNA is synthesized by RNA polymerase I using the specialty genes (rDNA) that encode for it, which are found repeatedly throughout the genome. The genes coding for 18S, 28S and 5.8S rRNA are located in the nucleolus organizer region and are transcribed into large precursor rRNA (pre-rRNA) molecules by RNA polymerase I. These pre-rRNA molecules are separated by external and internal spacer sequences and then methylated, which is key for later assembly and folding. After separation and release as individual molecules, assembly proteins bind to each naked rRNA strand and fold it into its functional form using cooperative assembly and progressive addition of more folding proteins as needed. The exact details of how the folding proteins bind to the rRNA and how correct folding is achieved remains unknown. The rRNA complexes are then further processed by reactions involving exo- and endo-nucleolytic cleavages guided by snoRNA (small nucleolar RNAs) in complex with proteins. As these complexes are compacted together to form a cohesive unit, interactions between rRNA and surrounding ribosomal proteins are constantly remodeled throughout assembly in order to provide stability and protect binding sites. This process is referred to as the "maturation" phase of the rRNA lifecycle. The modifications that occur during maturation of rRNA have been found to contribute directly to control of gene expression by providing physical regulation of translational access of tRNA and mRNA. Some studies have found that extensive methylation of various rRNA types is also necessary during this time to maintain ribosome stability.

The genes for 5S rRNA are located inside the nucleolus and are transcribed into pre-5S rRNA by RNA polymerase III. The pre-5S rRNA enters the nucleolus for processing and assembly with 28S and 5.8S rRNA to form the LSU. 18S rRNA forms the SSUs by combining with numerous ribosomal proteins. Once both subunits are assembled, they are individually exported into the cytoplasm to form the 80S unit and begin initiation of translation of mRNA.

Ribosomal RNA is non-coding and is never translated into proteins of any kind: rRNA is only transcribed from rDNA and then matured for use as a structural building block for ribosomes. Transcribed rRNA is bound to ribosomal proteins to form the subunits of ribosomes and acts as the physical structure that pushes mRNA and tRNA through the ribosome to process and translate them.

==== Eukaryotic regulation ====
Synthesis of rRNA is up-regulated and down-regulated to maintain homeostasis by a variety of processes and interactions:

- The kinase AKT indirectly promotes synthesis of rRNA as RNA polymerase I is AKT-dependent.
- Certain angiogenic ribonucleases, such as angiogenin (ANG), can translocate and accumulate in the nucleolus. When the concentration of ANG becomes too high, some studies have found that ANG can bind to the promoter region of rDNA and unnecessarily increase rRNA transcription. This can be damaging to the nucleolus and can even lead to unchecked transcription and cancer.
- During times of cellular glucose restriction, AMP-activated protein kinase (AMPK) discourages metabolic processes that consume energy but are non-essential. As a result, it is capable of phosphorylating RNA polymerase I (at the Ser-635 site) in order to down-regulate rRNA synthesis by disrupting transcription initiation.
- Impairment or removal of more than one pseudouridine or 29-O-methylation regions from the ribosome decoding center significantly reduces rate of rRNA transcription by reducing the rate of incorporation of new amino acids.
- Formation of heterochromatin is essential to silencing rRNA transcription, without which ribosomal RNA is synthesized unchecked and greatly decreases the lifespan of the organism.

=== In prokaryotes ===
Similar to eukaryotes, the production of rRNA is the rate-limiting step in the prokaryotic synthesis of a ribosome. In E. coli, it has been found that rRNA is transcribed from the two promoters P1 and P2 found within seven different rrn operons. The P1 promoter is specifically responsible for regulating rRNA synthesis during moderate to high bacterial growth rates. Because the transcriptional activity of this promoter is directly proportional to the growth rate, it is primarily responsible for rRNA regulation. An increased rRNA concentration serves as a negative feedback mechanism to ribosome synthesis. High NTP concentration has been found to be required for efficient transcription of the rrn P1 promoters. They are thought to form stabilizing complexes with RNA polymerase and the promoters. In bacteria specifically, this association of high NTP concentration with increased rRNA synthesis provides a molecular explanation as to why ribosomal and thus protein synthesis is dependent on growth-rate. A low growth-rate yields lower rRNA / ribosomal synthesis rates while a higher growth rate yields a higher rRNA / ribosomal synthesis rate. This allows a cell to save energy or increase its metabolic activity dependent on its needs and available resources.

In prokaryotic cells, each rRNA gene or operon is transcribed into a single RNA precursor that includes 16S, 23S, 5S rRNA and tRNA sequences along with transcribed spacers. The RNA processing then begins before the transcription is complete. During processing reactions, the rRNAs and tRNAs are released as separate molecules.

==== Prokaryotic regulation ====
Because of the vital role rRNA plays in the cell physiology of prokaryotes, there is much overlap in rRNA regulation mechanisms. At the transcriptional level, there are both positive and negative effectors of rRNA transcription that facilitate a cell's maintenance of homeostasis:

- An UP element upstream of the rrn P1 promoter can bind a subunit of RNA polymerase, thus promoting transcription of rRNA.
- Transcription factors such as FIS bind upstream of the promoter and interact with RNA polymerase which facilitates transcription.
- Anti-termination factors bind downstream of the rrn P2 promoter, preventing premature transcription termination.
- Due to the stringent response, when the availability of amino acids is low, ppGpp (a negative effector) can inhibit transcription from both the P1 and P2 promoters.

== Degradation ==
Ribosomal RNA is quite stable in comparison to other common types of RNA and persists for longer periods of time in a healthy cellular environment. Once assembled into functional units, ribosomal RNA within ribosomes are stable in the stationary phase of the cell life cycle for many hours. Degradation can be triggered via "stalling" of a ribosome, a state that occurs when the ribosome recognizes faulty mRNA or encounters other processing difficulties that causes translation by the ribosome to cease. Once a ribosome stalls, a specialized pathway on the ribosome is initiated to target the entire complex for disassembly.

=== In eukaryotes ===
As with any protein or RNA, rRNA production is prone to errors resulting in the production of non-functional rRNA. To correct this, the cell allows for degradation of rRNA through the non-functional rRNA decay (NRD) pathway. Much of the research in this topic was conducted on eukaryotic cells, specifically Saccharomyces cerevisiae yeast. Currently, only a basic understanding of how cells are able to target functionally defective ribosomes for ubiquination and degradation in eukaryotes is available.

- The NRD pathway for the 40S subunit may be independent or separate from the NRD pathway for the 60S subunit. It has been observed that certain genes were able to affect degradation of certain pre-RNAs, but not others.
- Numerous proteins are involved in the NRD pathway, such as Mms1p and Rtt101p, which are believed to complex together to target ribosomes for degradation. Mms1p and Rtt101p are found to bind together and Rtt101p is believed to recruit a ubiquitin E3 ligase complex, allowing for the non-functional ribosomes to be ubiquinated before being degraded.
  - Prokaryotes lack a homolog for Mms1, so it is unclear how prokaryotes are able to degrade non-functional rRNAs.
- The growth rate of eukaryotic cells did not seem to be significantly affected by the accumulation of non-functional rRNAs.

=== In prokaryotes ===
Although there is far less research available on ribosomal RNA degradation in prokaryotes in comparison to eukaryotes, there has still been interest on whether bacteria follow a similar degradation scheme in comparison to the NRD in eukaryotes. Much of the research done for prokaryotes has been conducted on Escherichia coli. Many differences were found between eukaryotic and prokaryotic rRNA degradation, leading researchers to believe that the two degrade using different pathways.

- Certain mutations in rRNA that were able to trigger rRNA degradation in eukaryotes were unable to do so in prokaryotes.
- Point mutations in a 23S rRNA would cause both 23S and 16S rRNAs to be degraded, in comparison to eukaryotes, in which mutations in one subunit would only cause that subunit to be degraded.
- Researchers found that removal of a whole helix structure (H69) from the 23S rRNA did not trigger its degradation. This led them to believe that H69 was critical for endonucleases to recognize and degrade the mutated rRNA.

== Sequence conservation and stability ==
Due to the prevalent and unwavering nature of rRNA across all organisms, the study of its resistance to gene transfer, mutation, and alteration without destruction of the organism has become a popular field of interest. Ribosomal RNA genes have been found to be tolerant to modification and incursion. When rRNA sequencing is altered, cells have been found to become compromised and quickly cease normal function. These key traits of rRNA have become especially important for gene database projects (comprehensive online resources such as SILVA or SINA) where alignment of ribosomal RNA sequences from across the different biologic domains greatly eases "taxonomic assignment, phylogenetic analysis and the investigation of microbial diversity."

Examples of resilience:

- Addition of large, nonsensical RNA fragments into many parts of the 16S rRNA unit does not observably alter the function of the ribosomal unit as a whole.
- Non-coding RNA_{RD7} has the capability to alter processing of rRNA to make the molecules resistant to degradation by carboxylic acid. This is a crucial mechanism in maintaining rRNA concentrations during active growth when acid build-up (due to the substrate phosphorylation required to produce ATP) can become toxic to intracellular functions.
- Insertion of hammerhead ribozymes that are capable of cis-cleavages along 16S rRNA greatly inhibit function and diminish stability.
- While most cellular functions degrade heavily after only short period of exposure to hypoxic environments, rRNA remains un-degraded and resolved after six days of prolonged hypoxia. Only after such an extended period of time do rRNA intermediates (indicative of degradation finally occurring) begin to present themselves.

== Significance ==
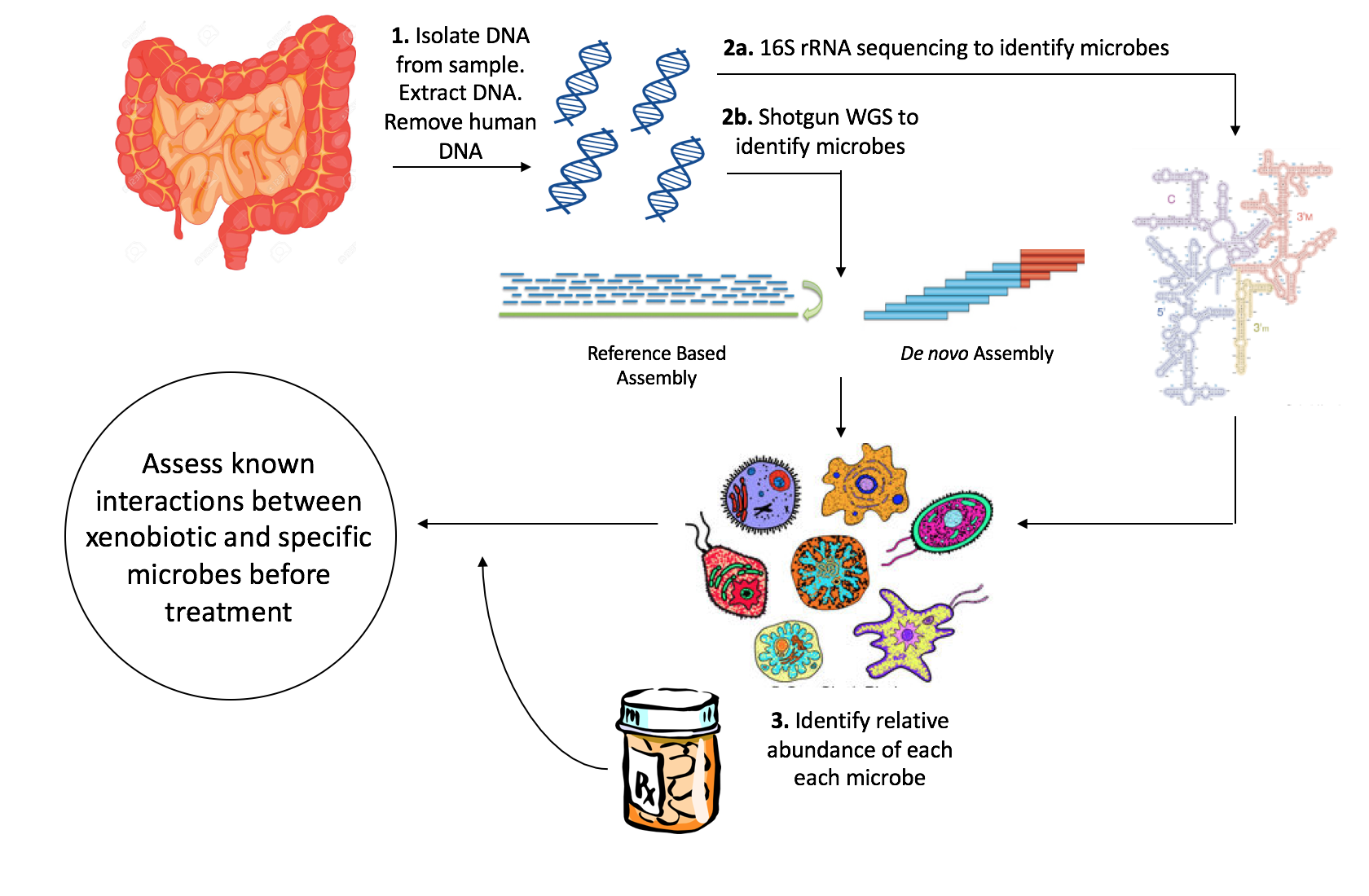
This diagram depicts how rRNA sequencing in prokaryotes can ultimately be used to produce pharmaceuticals to combat disease caused by the very microbes the rRNA was originally obtained from.

Ribosomal RNA characteristics are important in evolution, thus taxonomy and medicine.

- rRNA is one of only a few gene products present in all cells. For this reason, genes that encode the rRNA (rDNA) are sequenced to identify an organism's taxonomic group, calculate related groups, and estimate rates of species divergence. As a result, many thousands of rRNA sequences are known and stored in specialized databases such as RDP-II and SILVA.
- Alterations to rRNA are what allow certain disease-causing bacteria, such as Mycobacterium tuberculosis (the bacterium that causes tuberculosis) to develop extreme drug resistance. Due to similar issues, this has become a prevalent problem in veterinary medicine where the main method for handling bacterial infection in pets is administration of drugs that attack the peptidyl-transferase centre (PTC) of the bacterial ribosome. Mutations in 23S rRNA have created perfect resistance to these drugs as they operate together in an unknown fashion to bypass the PTC entirely.
- rRNA is the target of numerous clinically relevant antibiotics: chloramphenicol, erythromycin, kasugamycin, micrococcin, paromomycin, linezolid, alpha-sarcin, spectinomycin, streptomycin, and thiostrepton.
- rRNA have been shown to be the origin of species-specific microRNAs, like miR-663 in humans and miR-712 in mice. These particular miRNAs originate from the internal transcribed spacers of the rRNA.

== Human genes ==
- 45S: RNR1, RNR2, RNR3, RNR4, RNR5; (unclustered) RNA18SN1, RNA18SN2, RNA18SN3, RNA18SN4, RNA18SN5, RNA28SN1, RNA28SN2, RNA28SN3, RNA28SN4, RNA28SN5, RNA45SN1, RNA45SN2, RNA45SN3, RNA45SN4, RNA45SN5, RNA5-8SN1, RNA5-8SN2, RNA5-8SN3, RNA5-8SN4, RNA5-8SN5
- 5S: RNA5S1, RNA5S2, RNA5S3, RNA5S4, RNA5S5, RNA5S6, RNA5S7, RNA5S8, RNA5S9, RNA5S10, RNA5S11, RNA5S12, RNA5S13, RNA5S14, RNA5S15, RNA5S16, RNA5S17
- Mt: MT-RNR1, MT-TV (co-opted), MT-RNR2

== See also ==
- Ribotyping
- Diazaborine B, a maturation inhibitor of rRNAs for the large ribosomal subunit
