= Preribosomal RNA =

Preribosomal RNA (pre-rRNA) is the precursor to mature ribosomal RNA (rRNA), which is a component of ribosomes. Pre-rRNA is first transcribed from ribosomal DNA (rDNA), then cleaved and processed into mature rRNA.

== Overview ==
During or immediately following transcription of pre-rRNA from rDNA in the nucleolus, the ribosomal RNA precursor (pre-rRNA) is modified and associates with a few ribosomal proteins. Small nucleolar RNAs (snoRNA) dictate the modifications, by base-pairing with target sites in eukaryotic pre-rRNA and may also play a role in pre-rRNA folding. Pre-rRNA contains external transcribed spacers (5'-ETS, 3'-ETS) at both ends as well as internal transcribed spacers (ITS1, ITS2). Cleavages at sites A’ and T1 remove the 5’-ETS and 3’-ETS, respectively. Cleavages at sites A0, 1 and 2 give rise to 18S rRNA. Site 3 cleavage can take place before or after cleavage at sites A0, 1, and 2 and may be responsible for the linkage between 18S and 28S rRNA processing pathways. The last steps of rRNA processing require cleavages at 3, 4’, 4 and 5 in order to generate mature 5.8S and 28S rRNA.

== Modifications ==
Research suggests that either simultaneous to or immediately following synthesis of pre-rRNA, internal modifications are made at regions in the rRNA components, 18S, 5.8S, and 28S, which vary depending on cell type. Xenopus pre-rRNA modifications include ten base methylations, 105 2’-O-methylations of ribose and around 100 pseudouridines while yeast rRNA has merely half of these modifications. Small nucleolar RNA base-pairs with the pre-rRNA and determines the site of modifications. Individual snoRNA families perform different modifications. Box C/D snoRNA guides the formation of 2’-O-Me, while Box H/ACA snoRNA guide the pseudouridines formation. There is thought that the base-pairing of snoRNA to pre-rRNA acts as a chaperone in the folding of mature rRNA.

== Ribosomal proteins ==
Pre-rRNA comprises three main sizes; 37S (yeast), 40S (Xenopus) and 45S (mammals). In a series of steps, nearly 80 ribosomal proteins assemble with the pre-rRNA. During transcription of pre-rRNA, early ribosomal binding proteins associate. It is thought that this 30S RNP containing 45S pre-rRNA is the precursor for 80S RNP, which in turn, is the precursor to 55S RNP. 55S RNP makes up ~75% of the nucleolar population of pre-ribosomes.

== Ribosomal RNA processing ==
To form mature rRNA 18S, 5.8S, and 28S, pre-rRNA 40S (Xenopus) and 45S (mammals) must go through a series of cleavages to remove the external and internal spacers (ETS/ITS). This can be done in one of two pathways. Pathway 1 begins by cleavage at site 3, which separates the 5.8S and 28S rRNA coding regions in 32S pre-RNA from the 18S rRNA coding region in 20S pre-rRNA. Pathway 2 cleaves at sites A0, 1, and 2 initially, before cleaving at site 3.

=== U3 snoRNA ===
U3 snoRNA, the most abundant snoRNA required for rRNA processing, influences the pathway chosen. It associates with pre-rRNA through protein-protein interactions as well as base-pairing. To allow the U3 to function properly, base-pairing between the 3’ hinge region of U3 and complementary sequences in the 5’-ETS is required. However, pairing between the 5’-hinge of U3 and 5’-ETS may occur but is not necessary for function. Nucleolin, an abundant phosphoprotein, binds to the pre-rRNA immediately after transcription and facilitates the base-pairing between the U3 snoRNA hinges and the ETS.

=== Site A’ and T1 cleavage ===
The area where 5’-ETS is cross-linked to U3 is known as site A’, and is sometimes cleaved in a primary processing event in mammalian pre-rRNA. The cleavage of this site is dependent on U3, U14, E1 and E3 snoRNAs, and although this cleavage is not a prerequisite for the processing of pre-rRNA, the docking of snoRNP is crucial for 18S rRNA production. Shortly after the A’ cleavage, the 3’-ETS is cleaved at site T1 by U8 snoRNA.

=== Site A0, 1, and 2 cleavage ===
Subsequent cleaving at sites A0, 1, and 2 requires U3 snoRNA, U14 snoRNA snR30 and snR10 in yeast as well as U22 snoRNA in Xenopus. The cleavage of these sites is coordinated to result in a mature 18S rRNA. A0 cleavage requires Box A of U3 snoRNA. If Box A of U3 is mutated, A0 cleavage is inhibited and while 20S pre-rRNA accumulates it is not processed into 19S rRNA and cleavage at sites and 2 are also inhibited, which suggests that cleavage at A0 precedes that of sites 1 and 2. The mechanism for the cleavage of site 1 is not yet known however the position of U3 Box A near site 1 helps to prove that Box A is once again needed for site A1 cleavage. However site 2 requires the 3’-end of BoxA’ and U3 snoRNA for cleavage. Once site 2 is cleaved, 18S rRNA is liberated from the pre-rRNA.

=== Site 3 cleavage ===
Whereas U3 snoRNA is required for 18S rRNA formation, U8 snoRNA is required for 5.8S and 28S rRNA formation. The cleavage occurs at site 3, which is near the end of ITS1 and subsequently forms 32S pre-rRNA, a long-lived intermediate. Cleavage at site 4’, within ITS2, produces a precursor of 5.8S RNA that is longer at its 3’-end. To trim the 3’-end, cleavage must occur at sites 4 and 5. It is hypothesized that site 3 may serve as a link between 18S and 28S rRNA processing pathways in higher organisms.

== Different types ==
Pre-rRNA in all of biological kingdoms show similarities and differences. Eubacteria contain 16S and 23S rRNA that reside at the top of long base-paired stems that serve as the site for processing of RNase III cleavage. These two stems are also found in pre-rRNA from archaebacteria, however they do not exist in Xenopus pre-rRNA. It is thought that while base-pairing occurs in all types of pre-rRNA, they occur in cis in eubacterial pre-rRNA, whereas in eukaryotes it occurs in trans between snoRNAs and the termini of the rRNA coding regions in pre-rRNA. It is not fully clear why all three kingdoms possess pre-rRNA, rather than directly transcribing mature forms of rRNA, but it is believed that the transcribed spaces in the pre-rRNA may have some type of role in the proper folding of rRNA.
