= RNA polymerase I =

Enzyme in eukaryotes

RNA polymerase I (also known as Pol I) is the polymerase that transcribes ribosomal RNA, which accounts for over 50% of the total RNA synthesized in a cell, in higher eukaryotes. It does not transcribe 5S rRNA, which is synthesized by RNA polymerase III.

== Structure and function ==
Pol I is a 590 kDa enzyme that consists of 14 protein subunits (polypeptides), and its crystal structure in the yeast Saccharomyces cerevisiae was solved at 2.8Å resolution in 2013. Twelve of its subunits have identical or related counterparts in RNA polymerase II (Pol II) and RNA polymerase III (Pol III). The other two subunits are related to Pol II initiation factors and have structural homologues in Pol III.

Ribosomal DNA transcription is confined to the nucleolus, where about 400 copies of the 42.9-kb rDNA gene are present, arranged as tandem repeats in nucleolus organizer regions. Each copy contains a ~13.3 kb sequence encoding the 18S, the 5.8S, and the 28S RNA molecules, interlaced with two internal transcribed spacers, ITS1 and ITS2, and flanked upstream by a 5' external transcribed spacer and a downstream 3' external transcribed spacer. These components are transcribed together to form the 45S pre-rRNA. The 45S pre-rRNA is then post-transcriptionally cleaved by C/D box and H/ACA box snoRNAs, removing the two spacers and resulting in the three rRNAs by a complex series of steps. The 5S ribosomal RNA is transcribed by Pol III. Because of the simplicity of Pol I transcription, it is the fastest-acting polymerase and contributes up to 60% of cellular transcription levels in exponentially growing cells.

In Saccharomyces cerevisiae, the 5S rDNA has the unusual feature of lying inside the rDNA repeat. It is flanked by non-transcribed spacers NTS1 and NTS2, and is transcribed backwards by Pol III, separately from the rest of the rDNA.

== Regulation of rRNA transcription ==
The rate of cell growth is directly dependent on the rate of protein synthesis, which is itself intricately linked to ribosome synthesis and rRNA transcription. Thus, intracellular signals must coordinate the synthesis of rRNA with that of other components of protein translation. Myc is known to bind to human ribosomal DNA in order to stimulate rRNA transcription by RNA polymerase I. Two specific mechanisms have been identified, ensuring proper control of rRNA synthesis and Pol I-mediated transcription.

Given the large numbers of rDNA genes (several hundreds) available for transcription, the first mechanism involves adjustments in the number of genes being transcribed at a specific time. In mammalian cells, the number of active rDNA genes varies between cell types and level of differentiation. In general, as a cell becomes more differentiated, it requires less growth and, therefore, will have a decrease in rRNA synthesis and a decrease in rDNA genes being transcribed. When rRNA synthesis is stimulated, SL1 (selectivity factor 1) will bind to the promoters of rDNA genes that were previously silent, and recruit a pre-initiation complex to which Pol I will bind and start transcription of rRNA.

Changes in rRNA transcription can also occur via changes in the rate of transcription. While the exact mechanism through which Pol I increases its rate of transcription is as yet unknown, evidence has shown that rRNA synthesis can increase or decrease without changes in the number of actively transcribed rDNA.

== Transcription cycle ==
In the process of transcription (by any polymerase), there are three main stages:

1. Initiation: the construction of the RNA polymerase complex on the gene's promoter with the help of transcription factors.
2. Elongation: the actual transcription of the majority of the gene into a corresponding RNA sequence.
3. Termination: the cessation of RNA transcription and the disassembly of the RNA polymerase complex.

=== Initiation ===
Pol I requires no TATA box in the promoter, instead relying on an upstream control element (UCE) located between −200 and −107, and a core element located between −45 and +20.

1. The dimeric eukaryotic upstream binding factor (UBF) binds the UCE and the core element.
2. UBF recruits and binds a protein complex called SL1 in humans (or TIF-IB in mouse), composed of the TATA-binding protein (TBP) and three TBP-associated factors (TAFs).
3. The UBF dimer contains several high-mobility-group boxes (HMG-boxes) that introduce loops into the upstream region, allowing the UCE and the core elements to come into contact.
4. RRN3/TIF-IA is phosphorylated and binds Pol I.
5. Pol I binds to the UBF/SL1 complex via RRN3/TIF-IA, and transcription starts.

Note that this process is variable in different organisms.

=== Elongation ===
As Pol I escapes and clears the promoter, UBF and SL1 remain promoter-bound, ready to recruit another Pol I. Each active rDNA gene can be transcribed multiple times simultaneously, as opposed to Pol II-transcribed genes, which associate with only one complex at a time. In addition, UBF might also act as positive feedback, enhancing Pol I elongation through an anti-repressor function. An additional factor, TIF-IC, can also stimulate the overall rate of transcription and suppress pausing of Pol I. As Pol I proceeds along the rDNA, supercoils form both ahead of and behind the complex. These are unwound by topoisomerase I or II at regular intervals, similar to what is seen in Pol II-mediated transcription. Elongation is likely to be interrupted at sites of DNA damage. Transcription-coupled repair occurs similarly to Pol II-transcribed genes and requires the presence of several DNA repair proteins, such as TFIIH, CSB, and XPG.

While elongation proceeds unimpeded in vitro, it is currently unclear how the process is specifically affected by the presence of nucleosomes. Current studies suggest that multiple lobe-binding subunits are responsible for facilitating passage through nucleosomes during transcription.

=== Termination ===
In higher eukaryotes, TTF-I binds terminator elements downstream of the rRNA gene and bends the termination site at the 3' end of the transcript, forcing Pol I to pause. TTF-I, with the help of transcript-release factor PTRF and a T-rich region, induces Pol I to terminate transcription and dissociate from the DNA and the new transcript. TTF-I and PTRF then indirectly stimulate the reinitiation of transcription by Pol I at the same rDNA gene. Evidence suggests that termination might be rate-limiting in cases of high rRNA production. In organisms such as budding yeast, the process has been noted to be much more complicated and is still not completely elucidated.

== Recombination hotspot ==
Recombination hotspots are DNA sequences that increase local recombination. The HOT1 sequence in yeast is one of the most well studied mitotic recombination hotspots. The HOT1 sequence includes an RNA polymerase I transcription promoter. In a yeast mutant strain defective in RNA polymerase I the HOT1 activity in promoting recombination is abolished. The level of RNA polymerase I transcription activity that is dependent on the promoter in the HOT1 sequence appears to determine the level of nearby mitotic recombination.

== See also ==
- RNA polymerase
- RNA polymerase II
- RNA polymerase III
- Selective factor 1
