= Ribosomal DNA =

Genes coding for ribosomal RNA

The ribosomal DNA (rDNA) consists of a group of ribosomal RNA encoding genes and related regulatory elements, and is widespread in similar configuration in all domains of life. The ribosomal DNA encodes the non-coding ribosomal RNA, integral structural elements in the assembly of ribosomes, its importance making it the most abundant section of RNA found in cells of eukaryotes. Additionally, these segments include regulatory sections, such as a promoter specific to the RNA polymerase I, as well as both transcribed and non-transcribed spacer segments.

Due to their high importance in the assembly of ribosomes for protein biosynthesis, the rDNA genes are usually highly conserved in molecular evolution. The number of copies can vary considerably per species. Ribosomal DNA is widely used for phylogenetic studies.

== Structure ==
Genes of the ribosomal DNA
Type	SSU rRNA	LSU rRNA
Eukaryotes	18S rRNA	28S rRNA; 5.8S rRNA; 5S rRNA
Bacteria	16S rRNA	23S rRNA; 5S rRNA
Mitochondrial	MT-RNR1 (12S rRNA)	MT-RNR2 (16S rRNA)
Plastid	16S rRNA	23S rRNA; 4.5S rRNA; 5S rRNA

The ribosomal DNA includes all genes coding for the non-coding structural ribosomal RNA molecules. Across all domains of life, these are the structural sequences of the small subunit (16S or 18S rRNA) and the large subunit (23S or 28S rRNA). The assembly of the latter also include the 5S rRNA as well as the additional 5.8S rRNA in eukaryotes.

The rDNA-genes are commonly present with multiple copies in the genome, where they are organized in linked groups in most species, separated by an internal transcribed spacer (ITS) and preceded by the external transcribed spacer (ETS). The 5S rRNA is also linked to these rDNA region in prokaryotes, while it is located in separate repeating regions in most eukaryotes. They are transcribed together to a precursor RNA which is then processed to equal amounts of each rRNA.

=== Prokaryotes ===
The primary structural rRNA molecules in Bacteria and Archaea are smaller than their counterparts in eukaryotes, grouped as 16S rRNA and 23S rRNA. Meanwhile, the 5S rRNA also present in prokaryotes, is of a similar size to eukaryotes.

The form of rDNA operon most bacteria and archaea is "linked": from 3' to 5' one sees a continuous tract of 16S–23S–5S. The part between 16S and 23S is called the internal transcribed spacer (ITS) and often includes a tRNA. The part between 23S and 5S, though technically also a spacer that is internal and transcribed, does not have a name of its own.

A notable amount of bacteria and archaea diverge from the canonical structure of the operon containing the rDNA genes, instead carrying them as "unlinked" 16S and 23S–5S genes in different places of their genome. Archaea also show some other forms of divergence: the Thermoproteati have an eukaryote-style operon without 5S, and some archaeons have all three segments in different sites.

==== Plastids and mitochondria ====
Ribosomal DNA in typical chloroplasts follows the canonical structure of prokaryotic ribosomal DNA and goes: 16S–trnI–trnA–23S–4.5S–5S. The 4.5S corresponds to the 5' end fragment of 23S in bacteria.

The human mitochondrial DNA shows a typical 12S–tRNA^{Val}–16S organization, where 12S and 16S are greatly reduced versions of 16S and 23S of bacteria. Most vertebrates have the same organization of the rDNA operon, as do ticks. Some eukaryotes such as snails have a split structure where 16S and 12S are separate.

=== Eukaryotes ===
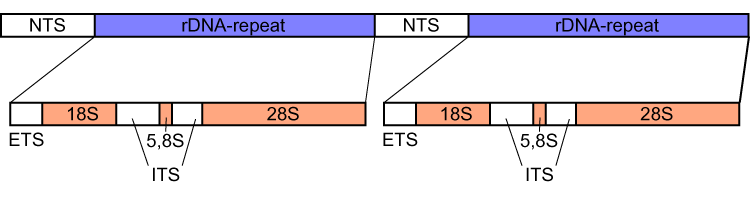
The gene segment of eukaryotic 45S rDNA contains 18S, 5.8S, and 28S tracts and forms a tandem repetitive cluster; the 5S rDNA is coded separately. NTS, nontranscribed spacer, ETS, external transcribed spacer, ITS, internal transcribed spacers 1 and 2, numbered from 5' end.

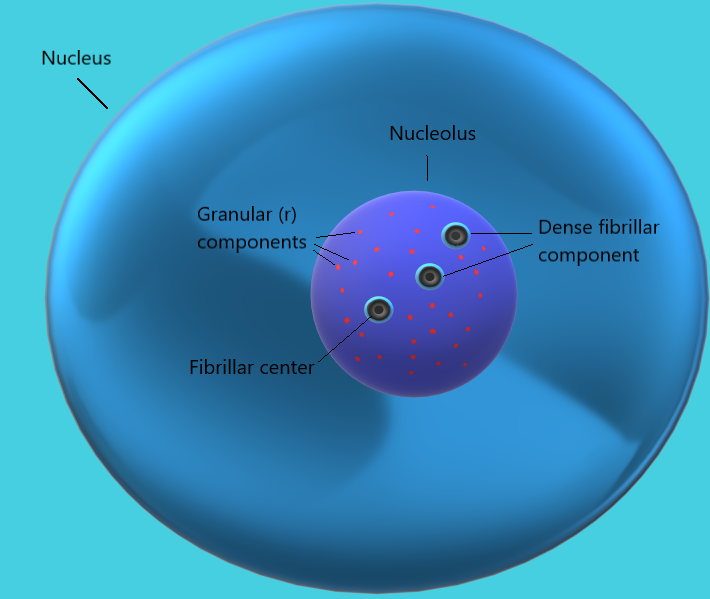
Nucleolus with pre-rRNA components called Introns and Exons

The 45S rDNA gene cluster of eukaryotes consists of the genes for the 18S, 5.8S and 28S rRNA, separated by the two ITS-1 and ITS-2 spacers. The active genome of eukaryotes contains several hundred copies of the polycistronic rDNA transcriptional unit as tandem repeats, they are organized in nucleolus organizer regions (NORs), which in turn can be present at multiple loci in the genome.

Similar to the structure of prokaryotes, the 5S rRNA is appended to the rDNA cluster in the Saccharomycetes such as Saccharomyces cerevisiae. Most eukaryotes however, carry the gene for the 5S rRNA in separate gene repeats at different loci in the genome. 5S rDNA is also present in independent tandem repeats as in Drosophila.

As repetitive DNA regions often undergo recombination events, the rDNA repeats have many regulatory mechanisms that keep the DNA from undergoing mutations, thus keeping the rDNA conserved.

In the nucleus, the nucleolus organizer regions give rise to the nucleolus, where the rDNA regions of the chromosome forms expanded chromosomal loops, accessible for transcription of rRNA. In rDNA, the tandem repeats are mostly found in the nucleolus; but heterochromatic rDNA is found outside of the nucleolus. However, transcriptionally active rDNA resides inside of the nucleolus itself.

==== Humans ====
The human genome contains a total of 560 copies of the 45S rDNA transcriptional unit, spread across five chromosomes with nucleolus organizer regions. The repeat clusters are located on the acrocentric chromosomes 13 (RNR1), 14 (RNR2), 15 (RNR3), 21 (RNR4) and 22 (RNR5).

Human 5S ribosomal DNA is located on chromosome 1. There are 17 copies in the human reference genome, in loci coded RNA5S1 through RNA5S17. An average haploid human genome actually has 98 copies of 5S.

==== Ciliates ====
In ciliates, the presence of a generative micronucleus next to the vegetative macronucleus allows for the reduction of rDNA genes in the germline. The exact number of copies in the micronucleus core genome ranging from several copies in Paramecium as low as a single copy in Tetrahymena thermophila and other Tetrahymena species. During macronucleus formation, the regions containing the rDNA gene clusters are amplified, dramatically increasing the amount of available templates for transcription up to several thousand copies. In some ciliate genera, such as Tetrahymena or the Hypotrich genus Oxytricha, extensive fragmentation of the amplified DNA leads to the formation of microchromosomes, centered on the rDNA transcriptional unit. Similar processes are reported from Glaucoma chattoni and to lesser extent from Paramecium.

== Sequence homogeneity ==
In the large rDNA array, polymorphisms between rDNA repeat units are very low, indicating that rDNA tandem arrays are evolving through concerted evolution. However, the mechanism of concerted evolution is imperfect, such that polymorphisms between repeats within an individual can occur at significant levels and may confound phylogenetic analyses for closely related organisms.

5S tandem repeat sequences in several Drosophila were compared with each other; the result revealed that insertions and deletions occurred frequently between species and often flanked by conserved sequences. They could occur by slippage of the newly synthesized strand during DNA replication or by gene conversion.

== Sequence divergence ==
The rDNA transcription tracts have low rate of polymorphism among species, which allows interspecific comparison to elucidate phylogenetic relationship using only a few specimens. Coding regions of rDNA are highly conserved among species but ITS regions are variable due to insertions, deletions, and point mutations. Between remote species as human and frog comparison of sequences at ITS tracts is not appropriate. Conserved sequences at coding regions of rDNA allow comparisons of remote species, even between yeast and human. Human 5.8S rRNA has 75% identity with yeast 5.8S rRNA. In cases for sibling species, comparison of the rDNA segment including ITS tracts among species and phylogenetic analysis are made satisfactorily. The different coding regions of the rDNA repeats usually show distinct evolutionary rates. As a result, this DNA can provide phylogenetic information of species belonging to wide systematic levels.

== Recombination-stimulating activity in yeast ==
A fragment of yeast rDNA containing the 5S gene, non-transcribed spacer DNA, and part of the 25S (yeast version of 28S) gene has localized cis-acting mitotic recombination stimulating activity. This DNA fragment contains a mitotic recombination hotspot, referred to as HOT1. HOT1 expresses recombination-stimulating activity when it is inserted into novel locations in the yeast genome. HOT1 includes an RNA polymerase I (PolI) transcription promoter that catalyzes 35S ribosomal rRNA (yeast version of 45S) gene transcription. In a PolI defective mutant, the HOT1 hotspot recombination-stimulating activity is abolished. The level of PolI transcription in HOT1 appears to determine the level of recombination.

== Clinical significance ==
Diseases can be associated with DNA mutations where DNA can be expanded, such as Huntington's disease, or lost due to deletion mutations. The same is true for mutations that occur in rDNA repeats; it has been found that if the genes that are associated with the synthesis of ribosomes are disrupted or mutated, it can result in various diseases associated with the skeleton or bone marrow. Also, any damage or disruption to the enzymes that protect the tandem repeats of the rDNA, can result in lower synthesis of ribosomes, which also lead to other defects in the cell. Neurological diseases can also arise from mutations in the rDNA tandem repeats, such as Bloom syndrome, which occurs when the number of tandem repeats increases close to a hundred-fold; compared with that of the normal number of tandem repeats. Various types of cancers can also be born from mutations of the tandem repeats in the ribosomal DNA. Cell lines can become malignant from either a rearrangement of the tandem repeats, or an expansion of the repeats in the rDNA.
