= Nucleolus organizer region =

The location of NORs and the nucleolar cycle in human cells.

Nucleolus organizer regions (American English) or nucleolus organiser regions (British English) (NORs) are chromosomal regions crucial for the formation of the nucleolus. In humans, the NORs are located on the short arms of the acrocentric chromosomes 13, 14, 15, 21 and 22, the genes RNR1, RNR2, RNR3, RNR4, and RNR5 respectively. These regions code for 5.8S, 18S, and 28S ribosomal RNA. The NORs are "sandwiched" between the repetitive, heterochromatic DNA sequences of the centromeres and telomeres. The exact sequence of these regions is not included in the human reference genome as of 2016 or the GRCh38.p10 released January 6, 2017. On 28 February 2019, GRCh38.p13 was released, which added the NOR sequences for the short arms of chromosomes 13, 14, 15, 21, and 22. However, it is known that NORs contain tandem copies of ribosomal DNA (rDNA) genes. Some sequences of flanking sequences proximal and distal to NORs have been reported. The NORs of a loris have been reported to be highly variable. There are also DNA sequences related to rDNA that are on other chromosomes and may be involved in nucleoli formation.

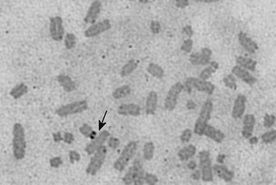
Silver-stained nucleolus organizer region (arrow) at the tip of a chromosome of the Gecko Lepidodactylus lugubris

== Visualization ==
The DJ forms a perinucleolar anchor for rDNA repeats.

Barbara McClintock first described the "nucleolar-organizing body" in Zea mays in 1934. In karyotype analysis, a silver stain can be used to identify the NOR. NORs can also be seen in nucleoli using silver stain, and that is being used to investigate cancerous changes. NORs can also be seen using antibodies directed against the protein UBF, which binds to NOR DNA.

== Molecular biology ==
In addition to UBF, NORs also bind to ATRX protein, treacle, sirtuin-7 and other proteins. UBF has been identified as a mitotic "bookmark" of expressed rDNA, which allows it to resume transcription quickly after mitosis. The distal flanking junction (DJ) of the NORs has been shown to associate with the periphery of nucleoli. rDNA operons in Escherichia coli have been found to cluster near each other, similar to a eukaryotic nucleolus.

== See also ==
- Cell nucleus
- Nucleoid
