= Diazaborine =

Diazaborine is a chemical compound with properties intermediate between benzene and borazine. Its chemical formula is C_{3}BN_{2}H_{5}. It resembles a benzene ring, except that three carbons are replaced by two nitrogen and boron, respectively. Notable molecules contain this moiety include diazaborine B.
