= Peptidyl transferase center =

Ribosomal component

Peptidyl transferase

Identifiers
- EC no.: 2.3.2.12
- CAS no.: 9059-29-4

Databases
- IntEnz: IntEnz view
- BRENDA: BRENDA entry
- ExPASy: NiceZyme view
- KEGG: KEGG entry
- MetaCyc: metabolic pathway
- PRIAM: profile
- PDB structures: RCSB PDB PDBe PDBsum
Search
- PMC: articles
- PubMed: articles
- NCBI: proteins

The peptidyl transferase center (EC 2.3.2.12, PTC) is an aminoacyltransferase ribozyme (RNA enzyme) located in the large subunit of the ribosome. It forms peptide bonds between adjacent amino acids during the translation process of protein biosynthesis.

Peptidyl transferase activity is not mediated by any ribosomal proteins, but entirely by ribosomal RNA (rRNA). The catalytic activity of the PTC is a significant piece of evidence supporting the RNA World hypothesis. The PTC is a highly conserved region with a very slow rate of mutation. It is considered to be among the most ancient elements of the ribosome, predating the last universal common ancestor.

The position of the PTC is analogous in all ribosomes (domain V in 23S numbering), being a part of the large subunit ribosomal RNA with the name only varying due to the different size in Svedberg. It acts as a ribozyme at the lower tips (acceptor ends) of the A- and P- site tRNAs. The different names include:

- Prokaryotes: 50S ribosomal subunit, 23S rRNA
- Eukaryotes: 60S ribosomal subunit, 28S rRNA
  - See also: Ribosomal RNA § Subunits and associated ribosomal RNA, mitochondrial ribosome, and Chloroplast § Chloroplast ribosomes.

Peptidyl transferases are not limited to translation, but there are relatively few enzymes with this function.

== Mechanism ==
The substrates for the peptidyl transferase reaction are two tRNA molecules: one in the peptidyl site, bearing the growing peptide chain, and the other in the aminoacyl site, bearing the amino acid that will be added to the chain. The peptidyl chain and the incoming amino acid are attached to their respective tRNAs via ester bonds to the oxygen atom at the 3' ends of these tRNAs. The 3' ends of all tRNAs share a universally conserved CCA sequence. The alignment between the CCA ends of the ribosome-bound peptidyl tRNA and aminoacyl tRNA in the peptidyl transferase center contribute to peptide bond formation by providing the proper orientation for the reaction to occur. This reaction occurs via nucleophilic displacement. The amino group of the aminoacyl tRNA attacks the terminal carbonyl group of the peptidyl tRNA. The reaction proceeds through a tetrahedral intermediate and the loss of the P site tRNA as a leaving group.

In peptidyl-tRNA hydrolysis, the same mechanism is used, but with a water molecule as the nucleophile.

== Evolution ==
=== Origin ===
Timing: Bokov and Steinberg (2009) "unwrapped" the 23S rRNA structure into several layers of contact. In their model, the PTC is the original element of 23S rRNA, to which structural features were later added. An opposing view from Caetano-Anollés and Sun (2014) is that the tRNA's acceptor arm and the aaRS's catalytic domain came earlier than the genetic code and the PTC.

Ancestor:

- Tamura proposed in 2011 that the original PTC was formed by the concatenation of tRNAs. Farias et al. (2014) performed ancestral sequence reconstruction on 22 types of tRNA and found a surprisingly high (for billions of years of divergence) 50.4% identity against the modern PTC of Thermus thermophilus, which is also identical in a few other thermophiles. The dinucleotide frequency was also similar across a wider range of bacteria. Prosdocimi et al. (2020) compared a very large collection of PTCs to form an ancestral consensus. From 5'-to-3', the proto-bacterial-PTC is probably formed by the concatenation of tRNA^{Pro}, tRNA^{Tyr}, tRNA^{Phe}, tRNA^{Gln}, and tRNA^{Gly}. They also cite a few other earlier works on this topic not mentioned here.
- An alternative view is based on the PTC's pseudotwofold symmetry. A prototype might have just had one half of this system. A 2022 study synthesized and tested a few "half-PTC" two-helix sequences. Some of them dimerize and form peptide bonds when tRNA is given.

==== Minimization ====
A designed minimized version of E. coli PTC from 2024 was able to fold into a PTC-like shape without the help of ribosomal proteins and bind tRNA analogues at the P-site and the A-site. It fails to form peptide bonds due to binding the molecules in the wrong orientation.

== Antibiotic inhibitors ==
The following protein synthesis inhibitors target the peptidyl transferase center:

- Chloramphenicol binds to residues A2451 and A2452 in the 23S rRNA of the ribosome and inhibits peptide bond formation.
- Pleuromutilins also bind to the peptidyl transferase center.
- Macrolide antibiotics are thought to inhibit peptidyl transferase, in addition to inhibiting ribosomal translocation.

== See also ==
- Enzyme
- Ribozyme
- Transferase
- Translation
