= 23S rRNA (guanine745-N1)-methyltransferase =

Class of enzymes

23S rRNA (guanine^{745}-N^{1})-methyltransferase

Identifiers
- EC no.: 2.1.1.187

Databases
- IntEnz: IntEnz view
- BRENDA: BRENDA entry
- ExPASy: NiceZyme view
- KEGG: KEGG entry
- MetaCyc: metabolic pathway
- PRIAM: profile
- PDB structures: RCSB PDB PDBe PDBsum
Search
- PMC: articles
- PubMed: articles
- NCBI: proteins

23S rRNA (guanine^{745}-N^{1})-methyltransferase (EC 2.1.1.187, Rlma(I), Rlma1, 23S rRNA m1G745 methyltransferase, YebH, RlmAI methyltransferase, ribosomal RNA(m1G)-methylase, rRNA(m1G)methylase, RrmA, 23S rRNA:m1G745 methyltransferase) is an enzyme with systematic name S-adenosyl-L-methionine:23S rRNA (guanine^{745}-N^{1})-methyltransferase. This enzyme catalyses the following chemical reaction

S-adenosyl-L-methionine + guanine^{745} in 23S rRNA $\rightleftharpoons$ S-adenosyl-L-homocysteine + N^{1}-methylguanine^{745} in 23S rRNA

The enzyme specifically methylates guanine^{745} at N^{1} in 23S rRNA.
