= 23S rRNA (guanosine2251-2'-O)-methyltransferase =

Class of enzymes

23S rRNA (guanosine^{2251}-2'-O)-methyltransferase

Identifiers
- EC no.: 2.1.1.185

Databases
- IntEnz: IntEnz view
- BRENDA: BRENDA entry
- ExPASy: NiceZyme view
- KEGG: KEGG entry
- MetaCyc: metabolic pathway
- PRIAM: profile
- PDB structures: RCSB PDB PDBe PDBsum
Search
- PMC: articles
- PubMed: articles
- NCBI: proteins

23S rRNA (guanosine^{2251}-2'-O)-methyltransferase (EC 2.1.1.185, rlmB (gene), yifH (gene)) is an enzyme with systematic name S-adenosyl-L-methionine:23S rRNA (guanosine^{2251}-2'-O-)-methyltransferase. This enzyme catalyses the following chemical reaction

S-adenosyl-L-methionine + guanosine^{2251} in 23S rRNA $\rightleftharpoons$ S-adenosyl-L-homocysteine + 2'-O-methylguanosine^{2251} in 23S rRNA

The enzyme catalyses the methylation of guanosine^{2251}.
