= 23S rRNA (guanine2069-N7)-methyltransferase =

Class of enzymes

23S rRNA (guanine^{2069}-N^{7})-methyltransferase

Identifiers
- EC no.: 2.1.1.264

Databases
- IntEnz: IntEnz view
- BRENDA: BRENDA entry
- ExPASy: NiceZyme view
- KEGG: KEGG entry
- MetaCyc: metabolic pathway
- PRIAM: profile
- PDB structures: RCSB PDB PDBe PDBsum
Search
- PMC: articles
- PubMed: articles
- NCBI: proteins

23S rRNA (guanine^{2069}-N^{7})-methyltransferase (EC 2.1.1.264, rlmK (gene), 23S rRNA m7G2069 methyltransferase) is an enzyme with systematic name S-adenosyl-L-methionine:23S rRNA (guanine^{2069}-N^{7})-methyltransferase. This enzyme catalyses the following chemical reaction

S-adenosyl-L-methionine + guanine^{2069} in 23S rRNA $\rightleftharpoons$ S-adenosyl-L-homocysteine + N^{7}-methylguanine^{2069} in 23S rRNA

The enzyme specifically methylates guanine^{2069} at position N^{7} in 23S rRNA.
