= 18S ribosomal RNA =

Part of the eukaryotic ribosomal RNA

Eukaryotic large subunit ribosomal RNA

Identifiers
- Symbol: SSU_rRNA_eukarya
- Rfam: RF01960

Other data
- RNA type: Gene; rRNA
- Domain: Eukarya
- PDB structures: PDBe

18S ribosomal RNA (abbreviated 18S rRNA) is a part of the ribosomal RNA in eukaryotes. It is a component of the Eukaryotic small ribosomal subunit (40S) and the cytosolic homologue of both the 12S rRNA in mitochondria and the 16S rRNA in plastids and prokaryotes. Similar to the prokaryotic 16S rRNA, the genes of the 18S ribosomal RNA have been widely used for phylogenetic studies and biodiversity screening of eukaryotes.

== Research history ==
Along with the 28S and 5.8S rRNA in eukaryotes, the 18S rRNA was early identified as integral structural element of ribosomes which were first characterized by their sedimentation properties and named according to measured Svedberg units.

Given its ubiquitous presence in eukaryotic life, the evolution of the 18S rRNA was soon proposed as marker for phylogenetic studies to resolve the evolution of eukaryotes.

== Structure and function ==
The 18S ribosomal RNA is the structural RNA of the small subunit in the eukaryotic cytoplasmic ribosome.

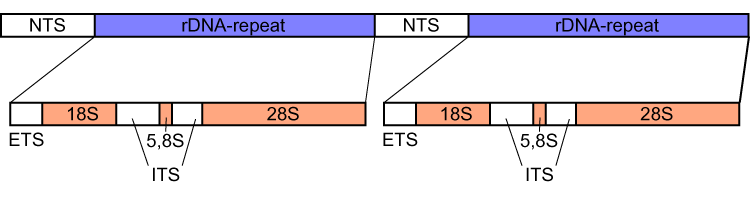
General organization of the eukaryotic nuclear rDNA tandem repeats consisting of ETS, 18S rRNA, ITS-1, 5.8S rRNA, ITS-2 and 28S rRNA.

The genomic sequence of the 18S rRNA is organized in a group with the 28S and 5.8S rRNA, separated and flanked by the ITS-1, ITS-2 and ETS spacer regions. These regions of ribosomal DNA (rDNA) are present with several hundred copies in the active genome, clustered in nucleolus organizer regions (NORs). In ribosome biogenesis, these genes are transcribed together by the RNA polymerase I and are processed in the nucleolus structure of the nucleus.

18S rRNA nucleotide length of selected species
Species	Size [nt]
Saccharomyces cerevisiae	1,789
Xenopus laevis	1,825
Homo sapiens	1,869
Drosophila melanogaster	1,995

The length of the 18S rRNA varies considerably in the eukaryotic phylogenetic tree, corresponding to a range of 16S-19S in Svedberg units, with the average length commonly given as around 2000 nucleotides. The 18S rRNA of humans has a length of 1869 nucleotides.

== Uses ==
The universal presence of the 18S rRNA in eukaryotes and generally high degree of conservation in evolution allow the construction of universal primers for DNA amplification by polymerase chain reaction. The possible applications mirror molecular methods involving 16S rRNA of prokaryotes.

=== Biodiversity screening ===
Primers binding in highly conserved regions of the 18S rRNA are an important marker for biodiversity screening, allowing the amplification of unspecified or random targets from environmental samples as well as uncharacterized specimens from collections for DNA sequencing. Subsequent sequence alignment covering the less strictly conserved segments then allows the assignment of a sample to biologic clades.

In the case of 18S rRNA, retrieval of DNA is improved by the abundance of repeating sequences of the rDNA within eukaryotic cells, promoting the sensitivity of the analysis.

=== Phylogenetics ===
Multiple properties of the genomic sequence of the 18S rRNA have established it as an important marker gene for large-scale phylogenetic analysis and the reconstruction of the metazoan tree of life. The integral role in formation and function of the ribosome is a key cause for its omnipresence in eukaryotic life. Meanwhile, the gene maintains a high degree of conservation under a persistent selective pressure in all living beings, highlighting its potential for comparison between distantly related clades.

Early studies utilizing the 18S rRNA sequence constructed the first large-scale phylogenetic trees of the metazoa. Evidence from further studies led to the creation of several important clades, such as the Ecdysozoa and Lophotrochozoa.

During the latter part of the 2000s, and with increased numbers of taxa included into molecular phylogenies, however, two problems became apparent. First, there are prevailing sequencing impediments in representatives of certain taxa, such as the mollusk classes Solenogastres and Tryblidia, selected bivalve taxa, and the enigmatic crustacean class Remipedia. Failure to obtain 18S sequences of single taxa is considered a common phenomenon but is rarely ever reported. Secondly, in contrast to initially high hopes, 18S cannot resolve nodes at all taxonomic levels and its efficacy varies considerably among clades. This has been discussed as an effect of rapid ancient radiation within short periods. Multigene analyses are currently thought to give more reliable results for tracing deep branching events in Metazoa but 18S still is extensively used in phylogenetic analyses.
