= Spacer DNA =

Region of non-coding DNA between genes

Spacer DNA is a region of non-coding DNA between genes. The terms intergenic spacer (IGS) or non-transcribed spacer (NTS) are used particularly for the spacer DNA between the many tandemly repeated copies of the ribosomal RNA genes.

In bacteria, spacer DNA sequences are only a few nucleotides long. In eukaryotes, they can be extensive and include repetitive DNA, comprising the majority of the DNA of the genome. In ribosomal DNA, there are spacers within and between gene clusters, called internal transcribed spacer (ITS) and external transcribed spacers (ETS), respectively. In animals, the mitochondrial DNA genes generally have very short spacers. In fungi, mitochondrial DNA spacers are common and variable in length, and they may also be mobile.

Due to the non-coding nature of spacer DNA, its nucleotide sequence changes much more rapidly over time than nucleotide sequences coding for genes that are subject to selective forces. Although spacer DNA might not have a function that depends on its nucleotide sequence, it may have sequence-independent functions.

Spacer DNA has practical applications that enable researchers and scientists to examine interactions between CRISPR proteins and bacteriophages.

== See also ==
- Internal transcribed spacer
- External transcribed spacer
- Non-coding DNA
