= 23S methyl RNA motif =

Conserved RNA structure

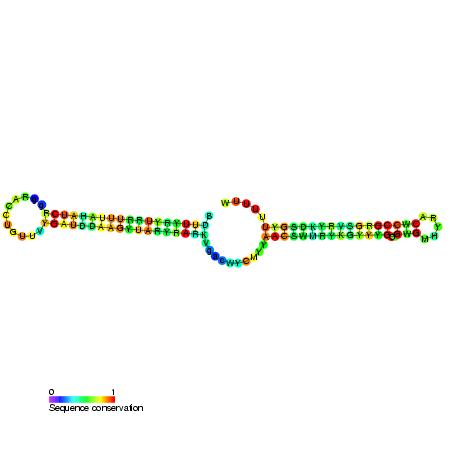
- Predicted secondary structure and sequence conservation of 23S methyl RNA motif

Identifiers
- Symbol: 23S-methyl
- Rfam: RF01065

Other data
- RNA type: Cis-reg
- Domain(s): Bacteria
- SO: SO:0005836
- PDB structures: PDBe

The 23S methyl RNA motif is a conserved RNA structure found upstream of genes predicted to encode rRNA methyltransferases, possibly for 23S rRNA. However, in one case it is far (3 kilobases) from the rRNA methyltransferase gene. Nonetheless, it was proposed that this RNA could be a cis-regulatory element, an attractive hypothesis as rRNA methyltransferases can bind RNA, and therefore presumably the 23S methyl RNA. This regulatory strategy is common in bacteria to control levels of ribosomal subunits, using RNA motifs called ribosomal leaders. Additionally, 23S methyl RNAs have rho-independent transcription terminators downstream, which could be a mechanism of regulation.

The 23S methyl RNA is found exclusively in the order of bacteria called Lactobacillales.
