= RNR4 =

Gene in the species Homo sapiens

Identifiers
- Aliases: RNR4, RNA, ribosomal 45S cluster 4
- External IDs: OMIM: 180453; GeneCards: RNR4
Orthologs
Databases	NCBI: entry
Species	Human	Mouse
Entrez	6055	n/a
Ensembl	n/a	n/a
UniProt	n a	n/a
RefSeq (mRNA)	n/a	n/a
RefSeq (protein)	n/a	n/a
Location (UCSC)	n/a	n/a
PubMed search		n/a
- Wikidata
View/Edit Human

RNR4 (RNA, ribosomal 45S cluster 4) is a human ribosomal DNA gene located on Chromosome 21. Tandem copies of this gene form one of five nucleolus organizer regions in the human genome, they are located on the chromosomes 13 (RNR1), 14 (RNR2), 15 (RNR3), 21 (RNR4), 22 (RNR5).

== See also ==
- Ribosomal RNA (rRNA)
