= RNR2 =

Gene in the species Homo sapiens

Identifiers
- Aliases: RNR2, RNA, ribosomal 45S cluster 2
- External IDs: OMIM: 180451; GeneCards: RNR2
Orthologs
Databases	NCBI: entry
Species	Human	Mouse
Entrez	6053	n/a
Ensembl	n/a	n/a
UniProt	n a	n/a
RefSeq (mRNA)	n/a	n/a
RefSeq (protein)	n/a	n/a
Location (UCSC)	n/a	n/a
PubMed search		n/a
- Wikidata
View/Edit Human

RNR2 (RNA, ribosomal 45S cluster 2) is a human ribosomal DNA gene located on Chromosome 14. Tandem copies of this gene form one of five nucleolus organizer regions in the human genome, they are located on the chromosomes 13 (RNR1), 14 (RNR2), 15 (RNR3), 21 (RNR4), 22 (RNR5). Each gene cluster contains 30–40 copies and encodes a 45S RNA product that is then processed to form 18S, 5.8S and 28S rRNA.
