= Diazaborine B =

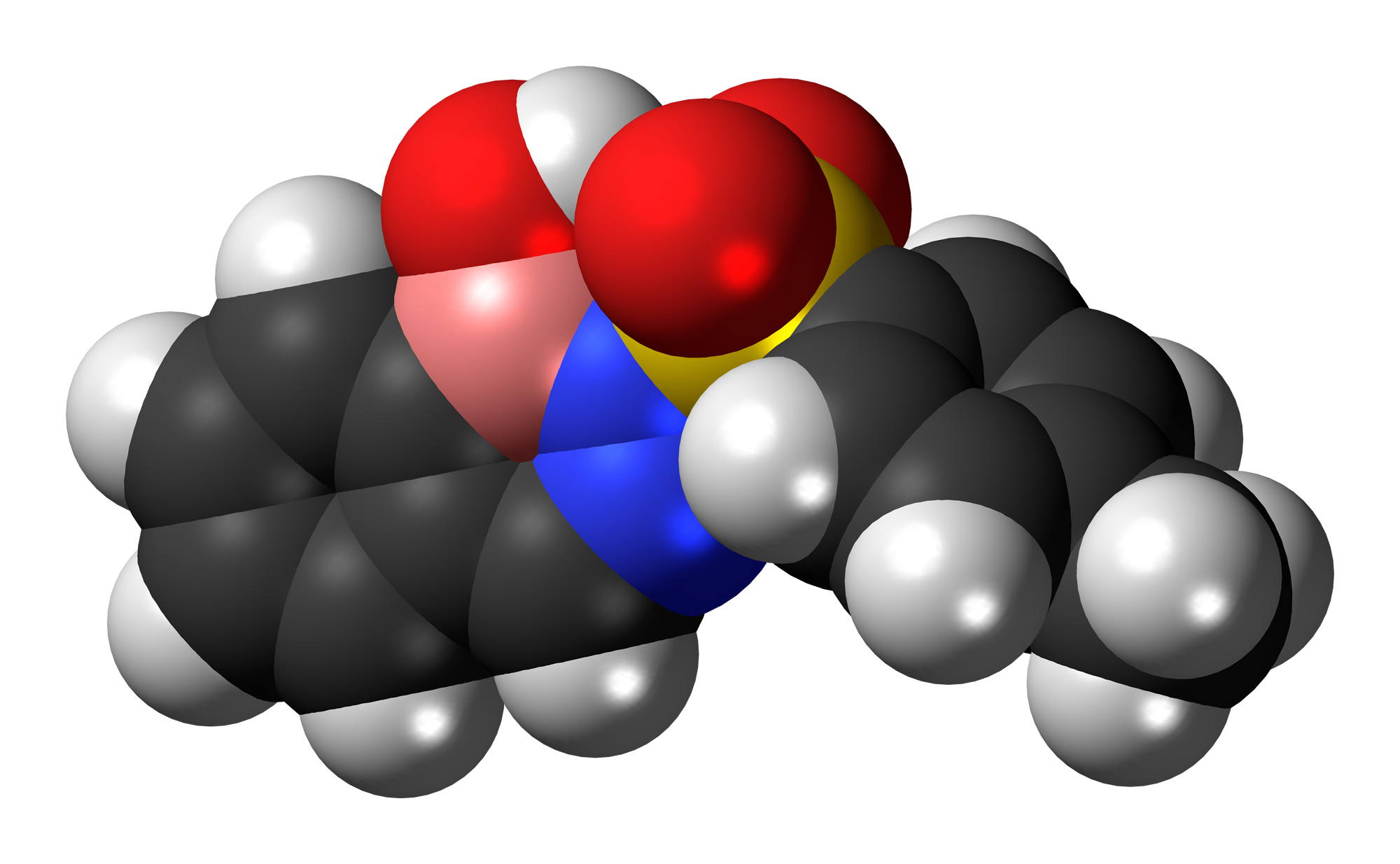

Names
- Preferred IUPAC name 2-(4-Methylbenzene-1-sulfonyl)-2,3,1-benzodiazaborinin-1(2H)-ol

Identifiers
CAS Number	22959-81-5
3D model (JSmol)	Interactive image
ChEBI	CHEBI:83945
ChEMBL	ChEMBL168634
ChemSpider	422598
DrugBank	DB08265
PubChem CID	481709
UNII	YEB3W2L5P3
CompTox Dashboard (EPA)	DTXSID201148398
- InChI: InChI=1S/C14H13BN2O3S/c1-11-6-8-13(9-7-11)21(19,20)17-15(18)14-5-3-2-4-12(14)10-16-17/h2-10,18H,1H3
- SMILES: O=S(=O)(N2/N=C\c1c(cccc1)B2O)c3ccc(cc3)C

Properties
Chemical formula	C_{14}H_{13}BN_{2}O_{3}S
Molar mass	300.14 g·mol^{−1}
- Except where otherwise noted, data are given for materials in their standard state (at 25 °C [77 °F], 100 kPa). Infobox references

Diazaborine B is a chemical compound that inhibits maturation of rRNAs for the large ribosomal subunit.
