= Internal transcribed spacer =

Intergenic DNA sequence separating ribosomal RNA genes

Internal transcribed spacer (ITS) is the spacer DNA situated between the small-subunit ribosomal RNA (rRNA) and large-subunit rRNA genes in the chromosome or the corresponding transcribed region in the polycistronic rRNA precursor transcript.

== Across life domains ==
In bacteria and archaea, there is a single ITS, located between the 16S and 23S rRNA genes. Conversely, there are two ITSs in eukaryotes: ITS1 is located between 18S and 5.8S rRNA genes, while ITS2 is between 5.8S and 28S (in opisthokonts, or 25S in plants) rRNA genes. ITS1 corresponds to the ITS in bacteria and archaea, while ITS2 originated as an insertion that interrupted the ancestral 23S rRNA gene.

== Organization ==
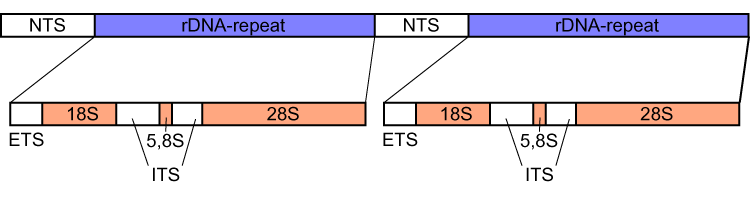
Organization of the eukaryotic nuclear ribosomal DNA tandem repeats

In bacteria and archaea, the ITS occurs in one to several copies, as do the flanking 16S and 23S genes. When there are multiple copies, these do not occur adjacent to one another. Rather, they occur in discrete locations in the circular chromosome. It is not uncommon in bacteria to carry tRNA genes in the ITS.

In eukaryotes, genes encoding ribosomal RNA and spacers occur in tandem repeats that are thousands of copies long, each separated by regions of non-transcribed DNA termed intergenic spacer (IGS) or non-transcribed spacer (NTS).

Each eukaryotic ribosomal cluster contains the 5' external transcribed spacer (5' ETS), the 18S rRNA gene, the ITS1, the 5.8S rRNA gene, the ITS2, the 26S or 28S rRNA gene, and finally the 3' ETS.

During rRNA maturation, ETS and ITS pieces are excised. As non-functional by-products of this maturation, they are rapidly degraded.

== Use in molecular phylogeny ==
Sequence comparison of the eukaryotic ITS regions is widely used in taxonomy and molecular phylogeny because of several favorable properties:

- It is routinely amplified thanks to its small size associated to the availability of highly conserved flanking sequences.
- It is easy to detect even from small quantities of DNA due to the high copy number of the rRNA clusters.
- It undergoes rapid concerted evolution via unequal crossing-over and gene conversion. This promotes intra-genomic homogeneity of the repeat units, although high-throughput sequencing showed the occurrence of frequent variations within plant species.
- It has a high degree of variation even between closely related species. This can be explained by the relatively low evolutionary pressure acting on such non-coding spacer sequences.

For example, ITS markers have proven especially useful for elucidating phylogenetic relationships among the following taxa.

Taxonomic group	Taxonomic level	Year	Authors with references
Asteraceae: Compositae	Species (congeneric)	1992	Baldwin et al.
Viscaceae: Arceuthobium	Species (congeneric)	1994	Nickrent et al.
Poaceae: Zea	Species (congeneric)	1996	Buckler & Holtsford
Leguminosae: Medicago	Species (congeneric)	1998	Bena et al.
Orchidaceae: Diseae	Genera (within tribes)	1999	Douzery et al.
Odonata: Calopteryx	Species (congeneric)	2001	Weekers et al.
Yeasts of clinical importance	Genera	2001	Chen et al.
Poaceae: Saccharinae	Genera (within tribes)	2002	Hodkinson et al.
Plantaginaceae: Plantago	Species (congeneric)	2002	Rønsted et al.
Jungermanniopsida: Herbertus	Species (congeneric)	2004	Feldberg et al.
Pinaceae: Tsuga	Species (congeneric)	2008	Havill et al.
Chrysomelidae: Altica	Genera (congeneric)	2009	Ruhl et al.
Symbiodinium	Clade	2009	Stat et al.
Brassicaceae	Tribes (within a family)	2010	Warwick et al.
Ericaceae: Erica	Species (congeneric)	2011	Pirie et al.
Diptera: Bactrocera	Species (congeneric)	2014	Boykin et al.
Scrophulariaceae: Scrophularia	Species (congeneric)	2014	Scheunert & Heubl
Potamogetonaceae: Potamogeton	Species (congeneric)	2016	Yang et al.

ITS2 is known to be more conserved than ITS1 is. All ITS2 sequences share a common core of secondary structure, while ITS1 structures are only conserved in much smaller taxonomic units. Regardless of the scope of conservation, structure-assisted comparison can provide higher resolution and robustness.

=== Mycological barcoding ===
The ITS region is the most widely sequenced DNA region in the field of mycology. and has been recommended as the universal fungal barcode sequence. It has typically been most useful for molecular systematics at the species to genus level, and even within species (e.g., to identify landraces). Because of its higher degree of variation than other genic regions of rDNA (for example, small- and large-subunit rRNA), variation among individual rDNA repeats can sometimes be observed within both the ITS and IGS regions. In addition to the universal ITS1+ITS4 primers used by many labs, several taxon-specific primers have been described that allow selective amplification of fungal sequences (e.g., see Gardes & Bruns 1993 paper describing amplification of basidiomycete ITS sequences from mycorrhiza samples). Despite shotgun sequencing and nanopore sequencing methods becoming increasingly utilized in medical microbiology, the low biomass of fungi present in clinical samples makes PCR based barcoding methods preferable.
