= Ribosomal translocation =

Ribosomal translocation takes place in the elongation of a protein in:

- Eukaryotic translation § Elongation
- Bacterial translation § Elongation
- Archaeal translation
