= MT-RNR1 =

SSU rRNA of the mitochondrial ribosome

mitochondrially encoded 12S RNA

Identifiers
- Symbol: MT-RNR1
- Alt. symbols: MTRNR1
- NCBI gene: 4549
- HGNC: 7470

Other data
- Locus: Chr. MT

Location of the MT-RNR1 gene on the H strand of the human mitochondrial genome. MT-RNR1, or RRNS, is one of the two mitochondrial ribosomal RNA genes (blue boxes).

Mitochondrially encoded 12S ribosomal RNA (often abbreviated as 12S or 12S rRNA) is the SSU rRNA of the mitochondrial ribosome. In humans, 12S is encoded by the MT-RNR1 gene and is 959 nucleotides long. MT-RNR1 is one of the 37 genes contained in animal mitochondria genomes. Their 2 rRNA, 22 tRNA and 13 mRNA genes are very useful in phylogenetic studies, in particular the 12S and 16S rRNAs. The 12S rRNA is the mitochondrial homologue of the prokaryotic 16S and eukaryotic nuclear 18S ribosomal RNAs. Mutations in the MT-RNR1 gene may be associated with hearing loss. The rRNA gene also encodes a peptide MOTS-c, also known as Mitochondrial-derived peptide MOTS-c or Mitochondrial open reading frame of the 12S rRNA-c.

== Structure ==
The MT-RNR1 gene is located on the p arm of the mitochondrial DNA at position 12 and it spans 953 base pairs.

== Function ==
The MT-RNR1 gene encodes for an rRNA responsible for regulating insulin sensitivity and metabolic homeostasis. The protein acts as an inhibitor of the folate cycle, thereby reducing de novo purine biosynthesis which leads to the accumulation of the de novo purine synthesis intermediate 5-aminoimidazole-4-carboxamide (AICAR) and the activation of the metabolic regulator 5'-AMP-activated protein kinase (AMPK). The protein also protects against age-dependent and diet-induced insulin resistance as well as diet-induced obesity.

== Clinical significance ==
=== Nonsyndromic hearing loss and deafness, mitochondrial ===
Pathogenic mutations in the MT-RNR1 gene have been found to cause late-onset Mitochondrial nonsyndromic hearing loss and deafness with predisposed aminoglycoside ototoxicities. Nonsyndromic deafness is characterized by a partial or total sensorineural hearing loss (SNHL) of variable onset and severity that is not associated with other signs and symptoms. Most forms of nonsyndromic deafness are associated with permanent hearing loss caused by damage to structures in the inner ear. Mutations of 1494C>T, 1555A>G, and 1095T>C in the MT-RNR1 gene have been identified to cause the hearing loss.

=== Complex IV deficiency ===
MT-RNR1 mutations have been associated with complex IV deficiency of the mitochondrial respiratory chain, also known as the cytochrome c oxidase deficiency. Cytochrome c oxidase deficiency is a rare genetic condition that can affect multiple parts of the body, including skeletal muscles, the heart, the brain, or the liver. Common clinical manifestations include myopathy, hypotonia, and encephalomyopathy, lactic acidosis, and hypertrophic cardiomyopathy. A 9952G>A mutation was found in a patient with the deficiency.
