= RNR1 =

Gene in the species Homo sapiens

Identifiers
- Aliases: RNR1, RNA, ribosomal 45S cluster 1
- External IDs: OMIM: 180450; GeneCards: RNR1
Orthologs
Databases	NCBI: entry
Species	Human	Mouse
Entrez	6052	n/a
Ensembl	n/a	n/a
UniProt	n a	n/a
RefSeq (mRNA)	n/a	n/a
RefSeq (protein)	n/a	n/a
Location (UCSC)	n/a	n/a
PubMed search		n/a
- Wikidata
View/Edit Human

RNR1 (RNA, ribosomal 45S cluster 1) is a human ribosomal DNA gene located on Chromosome 13. Tandem copies of this gene form one of five nucleolus organizer regions in the human genome, they are located on the chromosomes 13 (RNR1), 14 (RNR2), 15 (RNR3), 21 (RNR4), 22 (RNR5).
