= RNR5 =

Gene in the species Homo sapiens

Identifiers
- Aliases: RNR5, RNA, ribosomal 45S cluster 5
- External IDs: OMIM: 180454; GeneCards: RNR5
Orthologs
Databases	NCBI: entry
Species	Human	Mouse
Entrez	6056	n/a
Ensembl	n/a	n/a
UniProt	n a	n/a
RefSeq (mRNA)	n/a	n/a
RefSeq (protein)	n/a	n/a
Location (UCSC)	n/a	n/a
PubMed search		n/a
- Wikidata
View/Edit Human

RNR5 (RNA, ribosomal 45S cluster 5) is a human ribosomal DNA gene located on Chromosome 22. Tandem copies of this gene form one of five nucleolus organizer regions in the human genome, they are located on the chromosomes 13 (RNR1), 14 (RNR2), 15 (RNR3), 21 (RNR4), 22 (RNR5). Each gene cluster contains 30–40 copies and encodes a 45S RNA product that is then cleaved to form 18S, 5.8S and 28S rRNA subunits. In general, genes for RNA remain poorly annotated in most large public databases.
