= SSU rRNA =

One of the two major RNA components of the ribosome

Identifiers
- Symbol: SSU
- Rfam: CL00111

Other data
- PDB structures: PDBe

Small subunit ribosomal ribonucleic acid (SSU rRNA) is the smaller of the two major RNA components of the ribosome. Associated with a number of ribosomal proteins, the SSU rRNA forms the small subunit of the ribosome. It is encoded by SSU-rDNA.

== Characteristics ==
Characteristics of the SSU rRNA for exemplary species.
Type	SSU rRNA size	Species	Length	Accession	Reference
Bacterial (Prokaryotic)	16S	Escherichia coli	1,541 nt	J01859.1	
Archaeal (Prokaryotic)	16S	Halobacterium salinarum	1,473 nt	M38280.1	
Eukaryotic	18S	Homo sapiens	1,969 nt	M10098.1	
Mitochondrial	12S	Homo sapiens	954 nt	NC_012920.1	
Plastid	16S	Arabidopsis thaliana	1,491 nt	NC_000932.1	

== Use in phylogenetics ==
SSU rRNA sequences are widely used for determining evolutionary relationships among organisms, since they are of ancient origin and are found in all known forms of life.

== See also ==
- LSU rRNA: the large subunit ribosomal ribonucleic acid.
