= MT-RNR2 =

Human gene

mitochondrially encoded 16S RNA

Identifiers
- Symbol: MT-RNR2
- Alt. symbols: MTRNR2
- NCBI gene: 4550
- HGNC: 7471
- UniProt: Q8IVG9

Other data
- Locus: Chr. MT
Search for
- Structures: Swiss-model
- Domains: InterPro

Location of the MT-RNR2 gene on the H strand of the human mitochondrial genome. MT-RNR2, or RRNL, is one of the two mitochondrial ribosomal RNA genes (blue boxes).

Mitochondrially encoded 16S RNA (often abbreviated as 16S) is the mitochondrial large subunit ribosomal RNA that in humans is encoded by the MT-RNR2 gene. The MT-RNR2 gene also encodes the Humanin polypeptide that has been the target of Alzheimer's disease research.

The 16S rRNA is the mitochondrial homologue of the prokaryotic 23S and eukaryotic nuclear 28S ribosomal RNAs.

== See also ==
- Mitochondrial DNA
- Humanin
