= LSU rRNA =

One of the two major RNA components of the ribosome

Identifiers
- Symbol: LSU
- Rfam: CL00112

Other data
- PDB structures: PDBe

Large subunit ribosomal ribonucleic acid (LSU rRNA) is the largest of the two major RNA components of the ribosome. Associated with a number of ribosomal proteins, the LSU rRNA forms the large subunit of the ribosome. The LSU rRNA acts as a ribozyme, catalyzing peptide bond formation.

== Characteristics ==
Characteristics of the LSU rRNA for exemplary species.
Type	LSU rRNA size	Species	Length	Accession	Reference
Bacterial (Prokaryotic)	23S	Escherichia coli	2,905 nt	NR_076322.1	
Archaeal (Prokaryotic)	23S	Halobacterium salinarum	2,906 nt	NR_076247.1	
Eukaryotic	5.8S & 28S	Homo sapiens	157 + 5,025 nt	NR_145821.1; M11167.1	
Mitochondrial	16S	Homo sapiens	1,559 nt	NC_012920.1	
Plastid	23S	Arabidopsis thaliana	2,810 nt	NC_000932.1	

== Use in phylogenetics ==
LSU rRNA sequences are widely used for working out evolutionary relationships among organisms, since they are of ancient origin and are found in all known forms of life.

== See also ==
- SSU rRNA: the small subunit ribosomal ribonucleic acid.
