= 5.8S ribosomal RNA =

RNA component of the large subunit of the eukaryotic ribosome

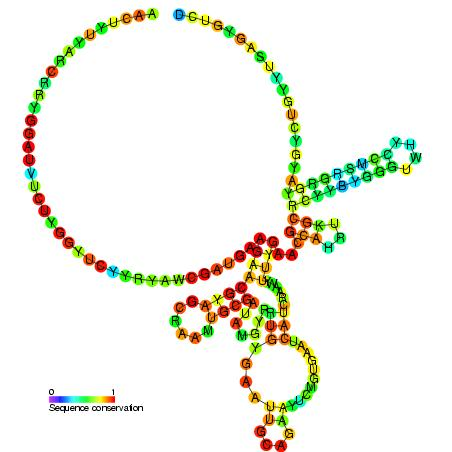
- Predicted secondary structure and sequence conservation of 5.8S ribosomal RNA

Identifiers
- Symbol: 5_8S_rRNA
- Rfam: RF00002

Other data
- RNA type: Gene; rRNA
- Domain(s): Eukaryota; Archaea
- GO: GO:0003735 GO:0005840
- SO: SO:0000375
- PDB structures: PDBe

In molecular biology, the 5.8S ribosomal RNA (5.8S rRNA) is a non-coding RNA component of the large subunit of the eukaryotic ribosome and so plays an important role in protein translation. It is transcribed by RNA polymerase I as part of the 45S precursor that also contains 18S and 28S rRNA. Its function is thought to be in ribosome translocation. It is also known to form covalent linkage to the p53 tumour suppressor protein. 5.8S rRNA can be used as a reference gene for miRNA detection. The 5.8S ribosomal RNA is used to better understand other rRNA processes and pathways in the cell.

The 5.8S rRNA is homologous to the 5' end of non-eukaryotic LSU rRNA. In eukaryotes, the insertion of ITS2 breaks LSU rRNA into 5.8S and 28S rRNAs. Some flies have their 5.8 rRNA further split into two pieces at the 3' end, forming what is called 5.8S, ITS2a, and 2S.

== Structure ==
L567.5 rRNA structure is approximately 150 nucleotides in size and it consists of plenty of folded strands, some of which are presumed to be single stranded. This ribosomal RNA, along with the 28S and 5S rRNA as well as 46 ribosomal proteins, forms the ribosomal large subunit (LSU). The 5.8S rRNA is initially transcribed along with the 18S and 28S rRNA in the 45S preribosomal RNA, along with the ITS 1 and ITS 2 (Internal transcribed spacer) and a 5’ and 3’ ETS (External transcribed spacer). The 5.8S rRNA is located between the two ITS regions, with ITS1 separating it from the 18S rRNA in the 5' direction, and ITS2 separating it from the 28S rRNA in the 3' direction. The ITS and ETS are cleaved away during rRNA maturation. This is accomplished through a continuous cleavage pathway performed by both endonuclease and exonuclease enzymes, cutting the spacers at specific locations.
