= 28S ribosomal RNA =

RNA component of the large subunit of the eukaryotic ribosome

Eukaryotic large subunit ribosomal RNA

Identifiers
- Symbol: LSU_rRNA_eukarya
- Rfam: RF02543

Other data
- RNA type: Gene; rRNA
- Domain: Eukarya
- SO: SO:0000653 SO:0001002
- PDB structures: PDBe

28S ribosomal RNA is the structural ribosomal RNA (rRNA) for the large subunit (LSU) of eukaryotic cytoplasmic ribosomes, and thus one of the basic components of all eukaryotic cells. It has a size of 25S in plants and 28S in mammals, hence the alias of 25S–28S rRNA.

Combined with 5.8S rRNA to the 5' side, it is the eukaryotic nuclear homologue of the prokaryotic 23S and mitochondrial 16S ribosomal RNAs.

== Use in phylogeny ==
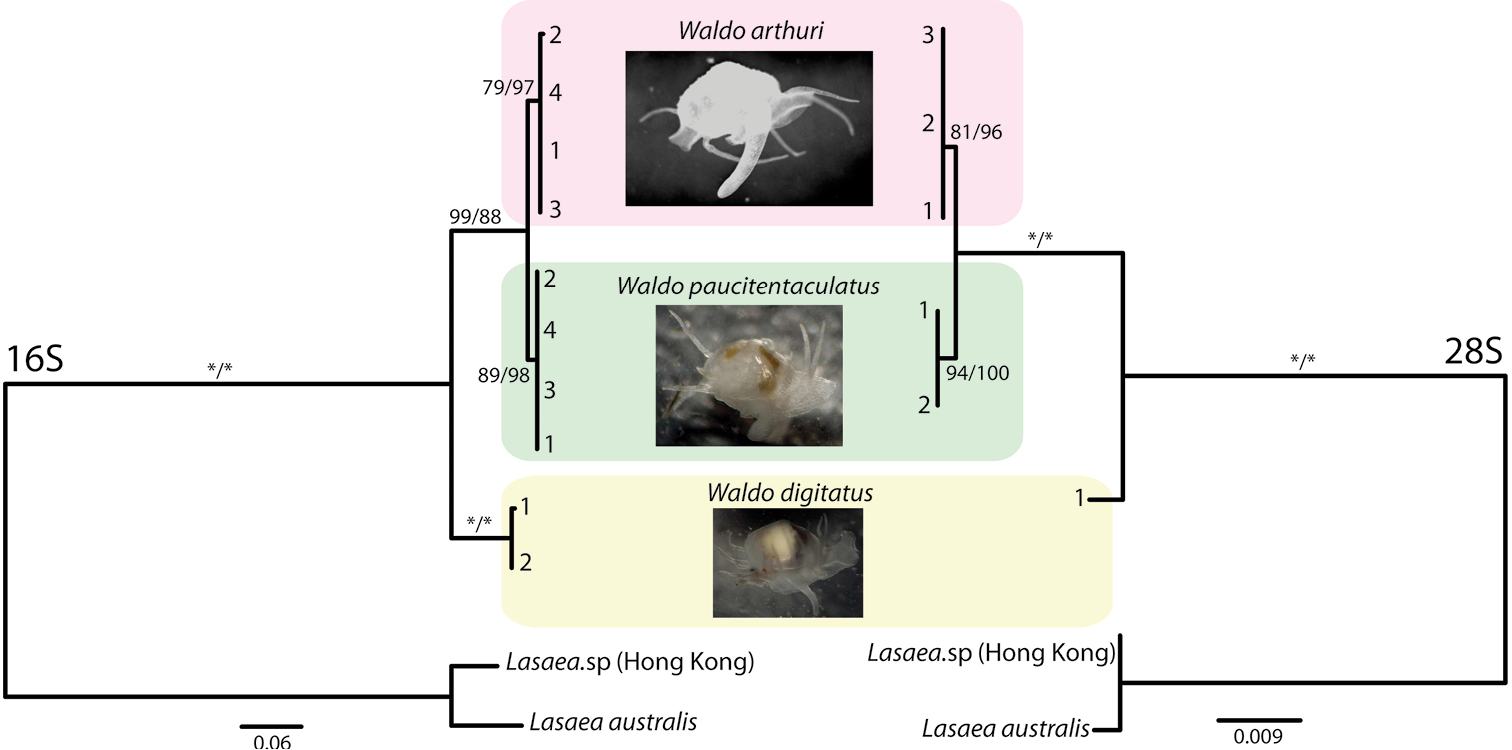
Mitochondrial 16S and nuclear 28S ribosomal DNA phylogenies of three species of mollusks belonging to the genus Waldo.

The genes coding for 28S rRNA are referred to as 28S rDNA. The comparison of the sequences from these genes are sometimes used in molecular analysis to construct phylogenetic trees, for example in protists, fungi, insects, arachnids, tardigrades, and vertebrates.

== Structure ==
The 28S rRNA is typically 4000–5000 nt long.

Some eukaryotes cleave 28S rRNA into two parts before assembling both into the ribosome, a phenomenon termed the "hidden break".

== Databases ==
Several databases provide alignments and annotations of LSU rRNA sequences for comparative purposes:

- RDP, the Ribosomal Database Project;
- SILVA, a ribosomal RNA gene database project.
