= 23S ribosomal RNA =

Component of the large subunit of the prokaryotic ribosome

Bacterial large subunit ribosomal RNA
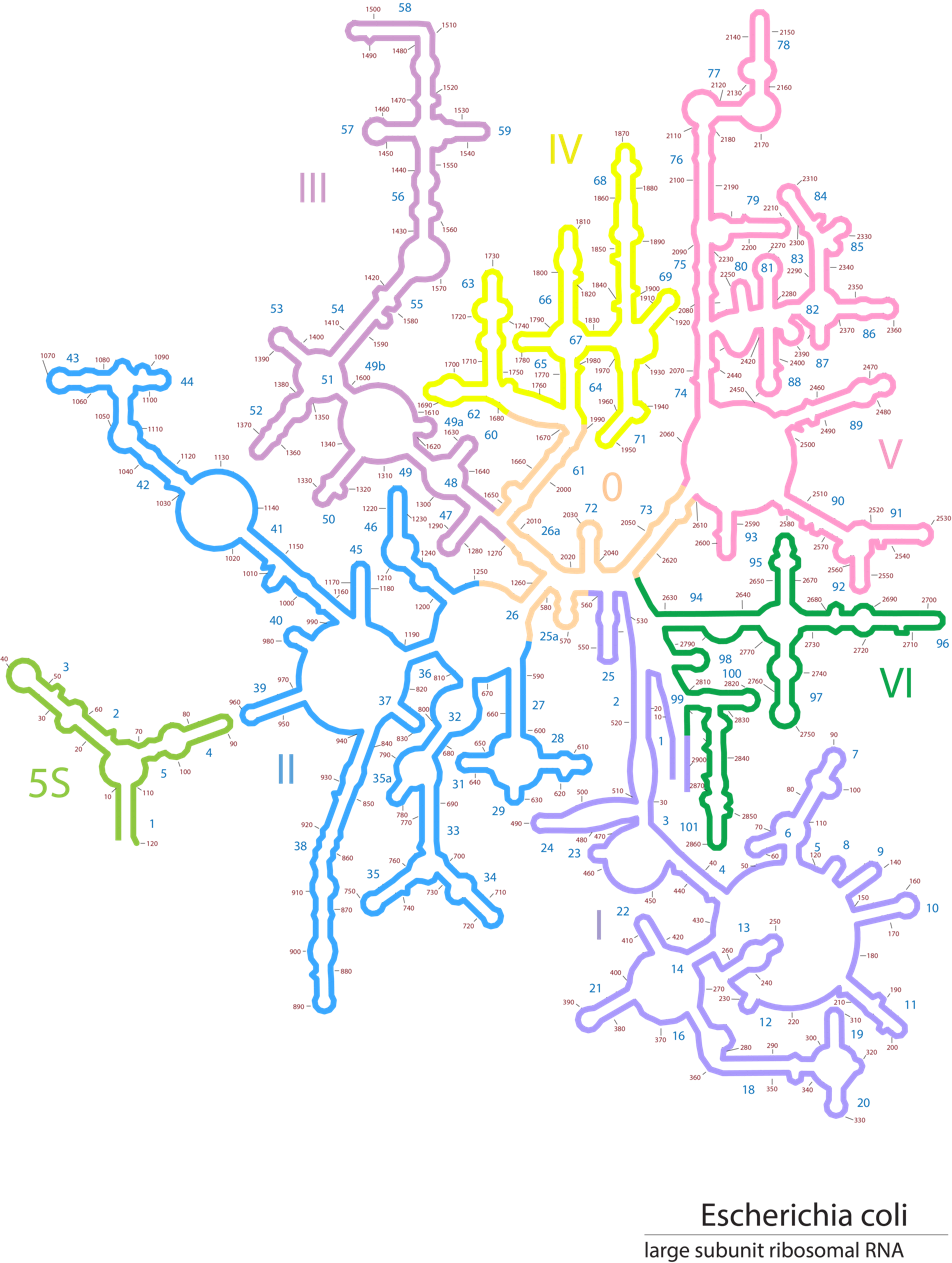
- 23S rRNA indicating nucleotide numbers, helix numbers, and domains

Identifiers
- Symbol: LSU_rRNA_bacteria
- Rfam: RF02541

Other data
- RNA type: Gene; rRNA
- Domain: Bacteria
- SO: SO:0001000
- PDB structures: PDBe

Archaeal large subunit ribosomal RNA

Identifiers
- Symbol: LSU_rRNA_archaea
- Rfam: RF02540

Other data
- RNA type: Gene; rRNA
- Domain: Archaea
- SO: SO:0001000
- PDB structures: PDBe

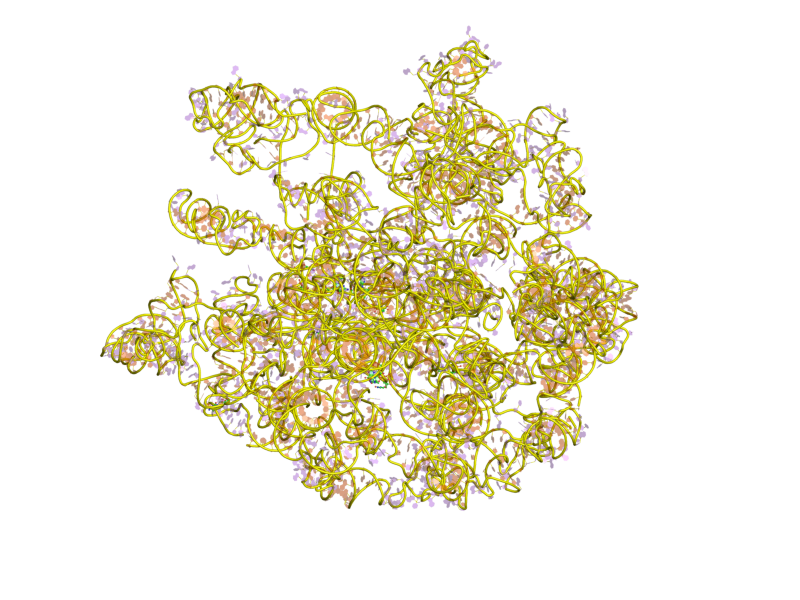
A 3D representation of the ribosome. This is a view of the 3D arrangement of the 23S and 5S rRNA in the Escherichia coli 50S ribosomal subunit based on a cryo-electron microscopic reconstruction.

The 23S rRNA is a 2,904 nucleotide long (in E. coli) component of the large subunit (50S) of the bacterial/archean ribosome and makes up the peptidyl transferase center (PTC). The 23S rRNA is divided into six secondary structural domains titled I-VI, with the corresponding 5S rRNA being considered domain VII. The ribosomal peptidyl transferase activity resides in domain V of this rRNA, which is also the most common binding site for antibiotics that inhibit translation, making it a target for ribosomal engineering. A well-known member of this antibiotic class, chloramphenicol, acts by inhibiting peptide bond formation, with recent 3D-structural studies showing two different binding sites depending on the species of ribosome. Numerous mutations in domains of the 23S rRNA with Peptidyl transferase activity have resulted in antibiotic resistance. 23S rRNA genes typically have higher sequence variations, including insertions and/or deletions, compared to other rRNAs.

The eukaryotic homolog of the 23S LSU rRNA is the 28S ribosomal RNA, with a region filled by the 5.8S ribosomal RNA.

== 23S rRNA Functions ==
In general, rRNA has an essential function of peptidyl transferase. The stimulating core of the ribosome plays role in the peptide bond configuration. Both peptidyl-tRNA and aminoacyl-tRNA are important for protein synthesis and transpeptidation response.

=== Essential Bases ===
However, 23S rRNA positions (G2252, A2451, U2506, and U2585) have a significant function for tRNA binding in the P site of the large ribosomal subunit. These modification nucleotides in site P can inhibit peptidyl-tRNA from binding. U2555 modification can also intervene with transferring peptidyl-tRNA to puromycin. Furthermore, the chemical modification of half of these positions G2251, G2253, A2439, and U2584 can not prevent the tRNA binding. Peptidyl-tRNA of 50S subunits which binds to the P site preserve eight positions of 23S rRNA from chemical modification. On the other hand, mutation in 23S rRNA can also have impacts on cell growth. Mutations A1912G, A1919G and Ψ1917C have a powerful growth phenotype and they prevent translation while mutation A1916G has a simple growth phenotype and it leads to defect in the 50S subunits.

== 23S rRNA Helix 26a ==
The 23S ribosomal RNA is composed of six domains forming a complex network of molecular interactions. A central single-stranded region connects all of the domains through base-pairing of the two halves, forming Helix 26a. Some consider Helix 26a to be Domain 0 due to its action as a central core and compact folding unit. Comparison of 23S and 28S ribosomal RNA sequences across species demonstrate conservation of Helix 26a. Helices continue to provide the support as the backbone of domain architecture.

== Plastid ==
Chloroplast ribosomes from "higher" plants have an additional 4.5S rRNA created by fragmentation of 23S. It is located to the 3' side of 23S in the rRNA operon and corresponds to the 3' end of non-fragmented 23S rRNA.

== See also ==
- 23S methyl RNA motif
- LSU rRNA
