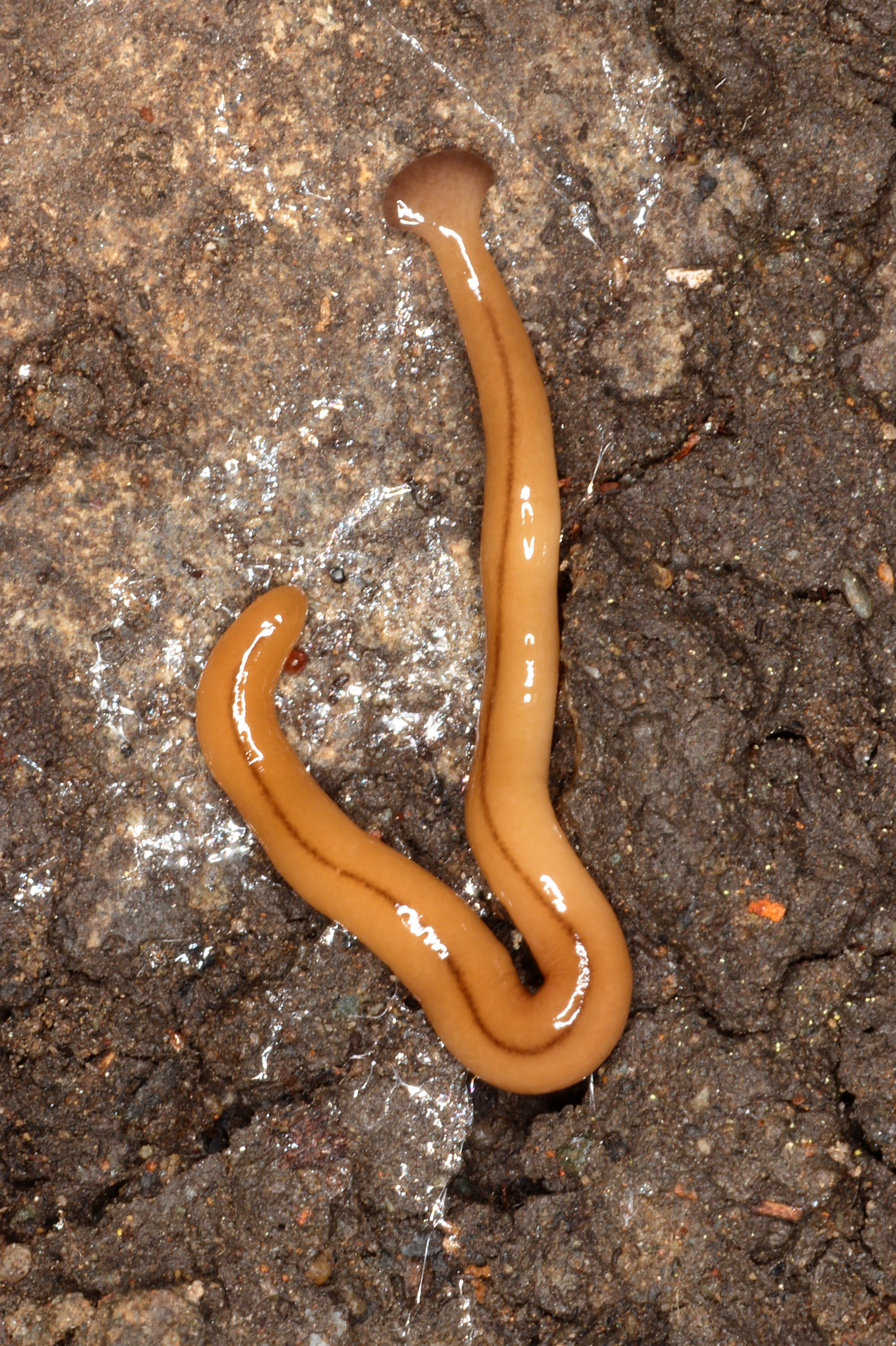

Scientific classification
- Kingdom: Animalia
- Phylum: Platyhelminthes
- Order: Tricladida
- Family: Geoplanidae
- Genus: Bipalium
- Species: B. adventitium

Binomial name
- Bipalium adventitium Hyman, 1943

= Bipalium adventitium =

Species of flatworm

Bipalium adventitium, the wandering broadhead planarian, is a land planarian in the subfamily Bipaliinae. Native to Asia, it has been accidentally introduced in the United States, where it is considered invasive.

== Appearance ==
Most adult individuals of B. adventitium are 5–8 cm (2.0–3.1 in) in length. The head is expanded and fan-shaped, being easily distinguishable from other common species of Bipalium, such as Bipalium kewense and Bipalium pennsylvanicum, because these have a head in the shape of a half moon. The body has a yellow to tan color and has one dark dorsal stripe that does not extend over the head.

== Behaviour and ecology ==
=== Predation ===
Bipalium adventitium is known to prey on earthworms. In order to catch its prey, it follows a chemical trail given off by the earthworm. Chemoreceptors on the head are responsible for sensing the trail left by the prey. After finding an earthworm, the planarian quickly crawls over it and wraps itself around the prey, preventing its escape. In addition, it is known to attack and eat any earthworm, including those that are 100 times their own mass. In North America, where B. adventitium is an introduced species, most earthworms do not immediately recognize the flatworm as a predator. They try to escape only after being pierced by the planarian's everted pharynx, which is one of the reasons of B. adventitium's success in invading this continent.

Recently, it has been confirmed that the potent neurotoxin tetrodotoxin is present in B. adventitium. Its function is yet unknown, but it may be used as a defense against predators or as a way to subdue prey.

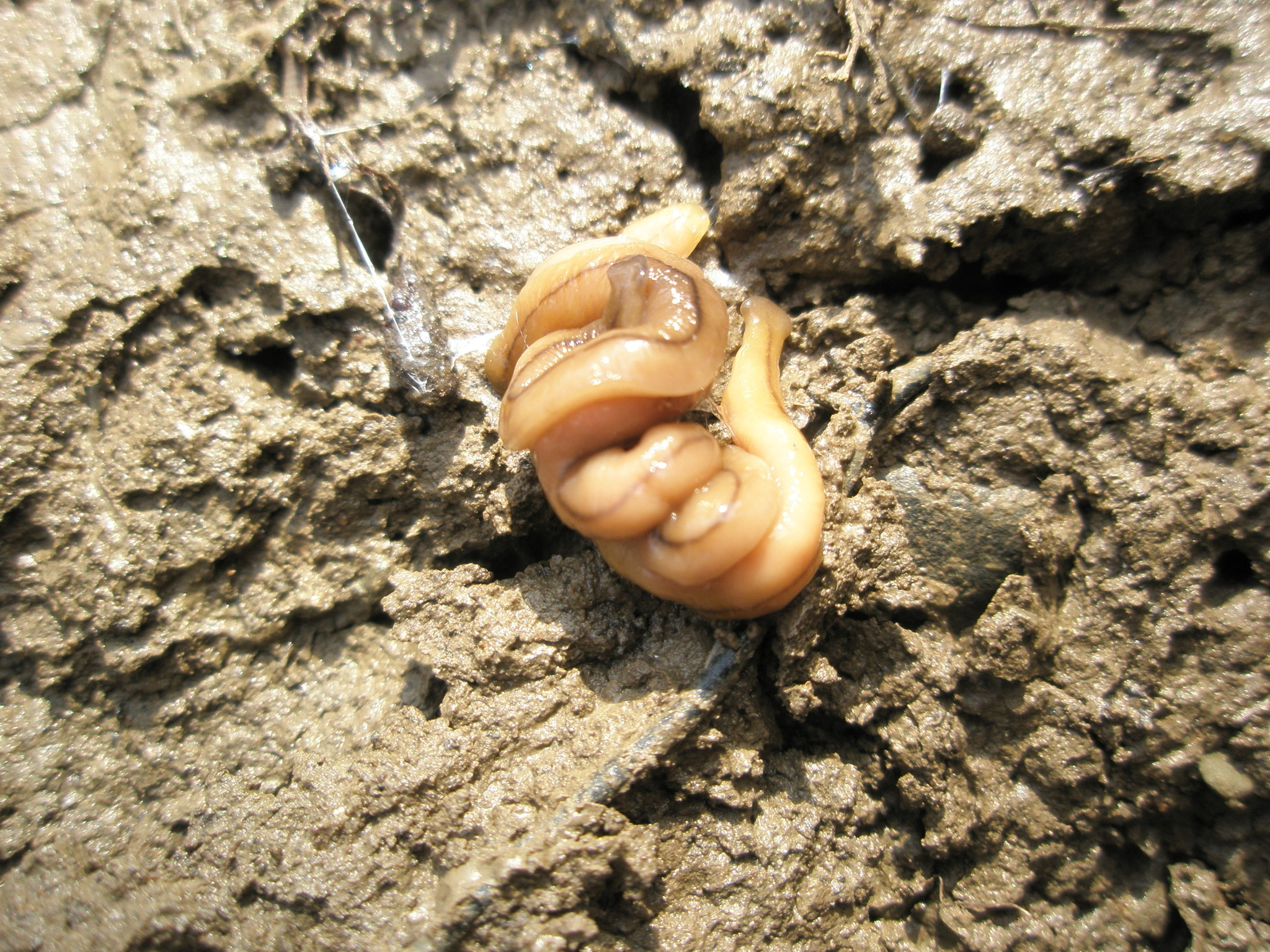
Two individuals of Bipalium adventitium wrapped around each other, probably mating.

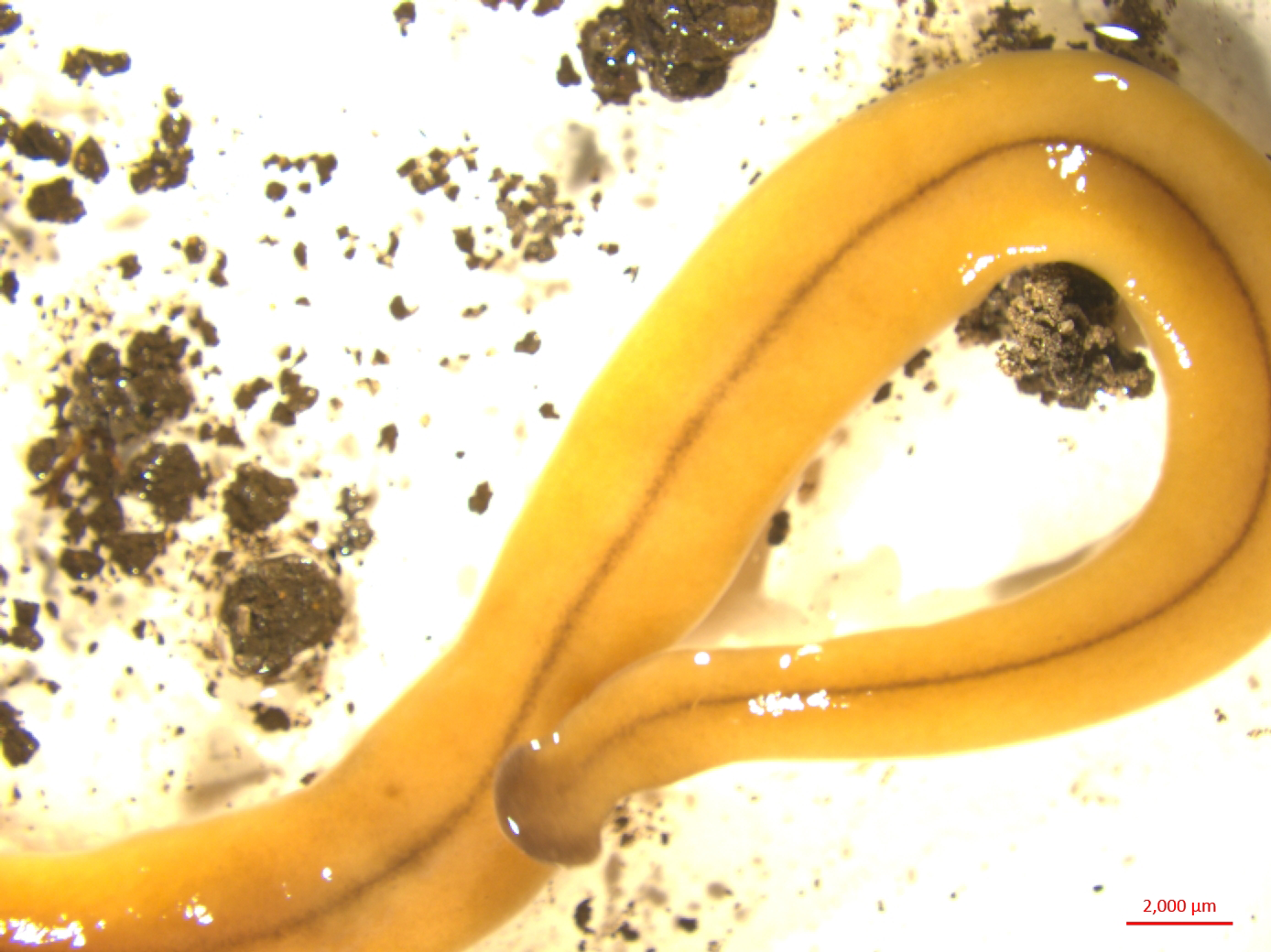
Bipalium adventitium from Montréal, Quebec, Canada

=== Reproduction ===
Differently from Bipalium kewense, which usually reproduces asexually by fission, Bipalium adventitium more commonly reproduces sexually. It is suggested that it has only one breeding season per year. As in most land planarians, mating occurs by internal fertilization when two individuals meet. The eggs are deposited in egg capsules and after about 3 weeks they release 1–6 juveniles.

=== Invasion of North America ===
Bipalium adventitium is believed to have been introduced in the last century to the United States from Asia. It is believed that this broadhead planarian was introduced and spread to most Northern states passively by human dispersal and has become abundant in the region it occupies. It is more commonly found in suburban areas and nurseries where exotic plants are prevalent. It is found in gardens and woodlands under objects like leaf litter, where the soil is moist. The ecological consequences of this invasion have not yet been fully explored.

In 2019, the species was recorded for the first time in Montréal, Quebec, Canada.
