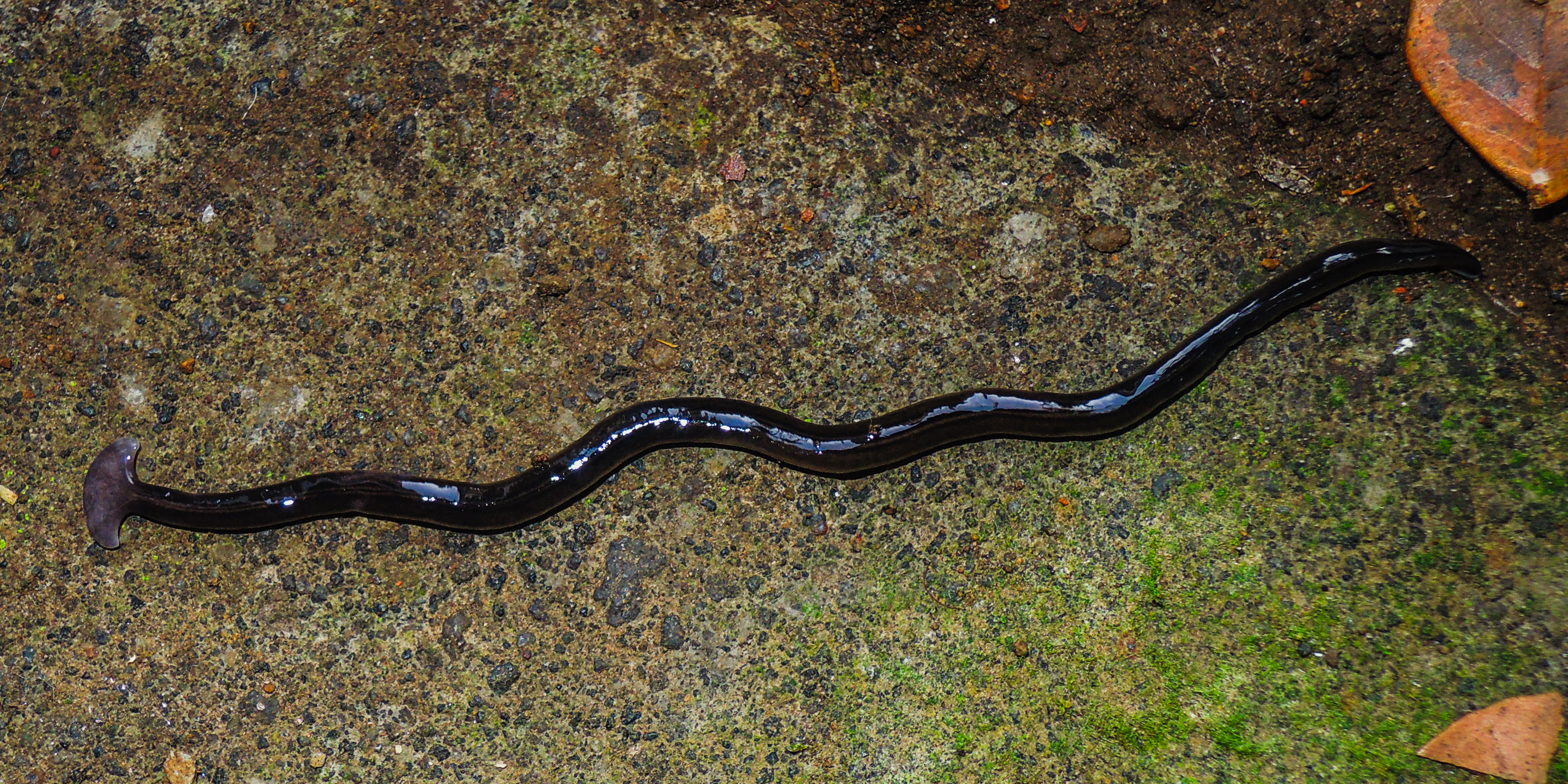

Scientific classification
- Domain: Eukaryota
- Kingdom: Animalia
- Phylum: Platyhelminthes
- Order: Tricladida
- Family: Geoplanidae
- Genus: Bipalium
- Species: B. javanum

Binomial name
- Bipalium javanum Loman, 1883

= Bipalium javanum =

Species of planarian

Bipalium javanum, the Javan broadhead planarian, is a species of land planarian belonging to the subfamily Bipaliinae. It is endemic to Indonesia.

== Description ==
Like most members of the genus Bipalium, Bipalium javanum has a distinct broad, "hammer-like" head that's about one centimeter wide. It has a slender body that can reach up to 20 cm long and 0.5 cm wide. The ends of the body are rounded. The dorsal side of the body is shiny and black, and the creeping sole on the ventral side is narrow and white. The pharynx is on the ventral side, and the eye spots are on the dorsal side.
