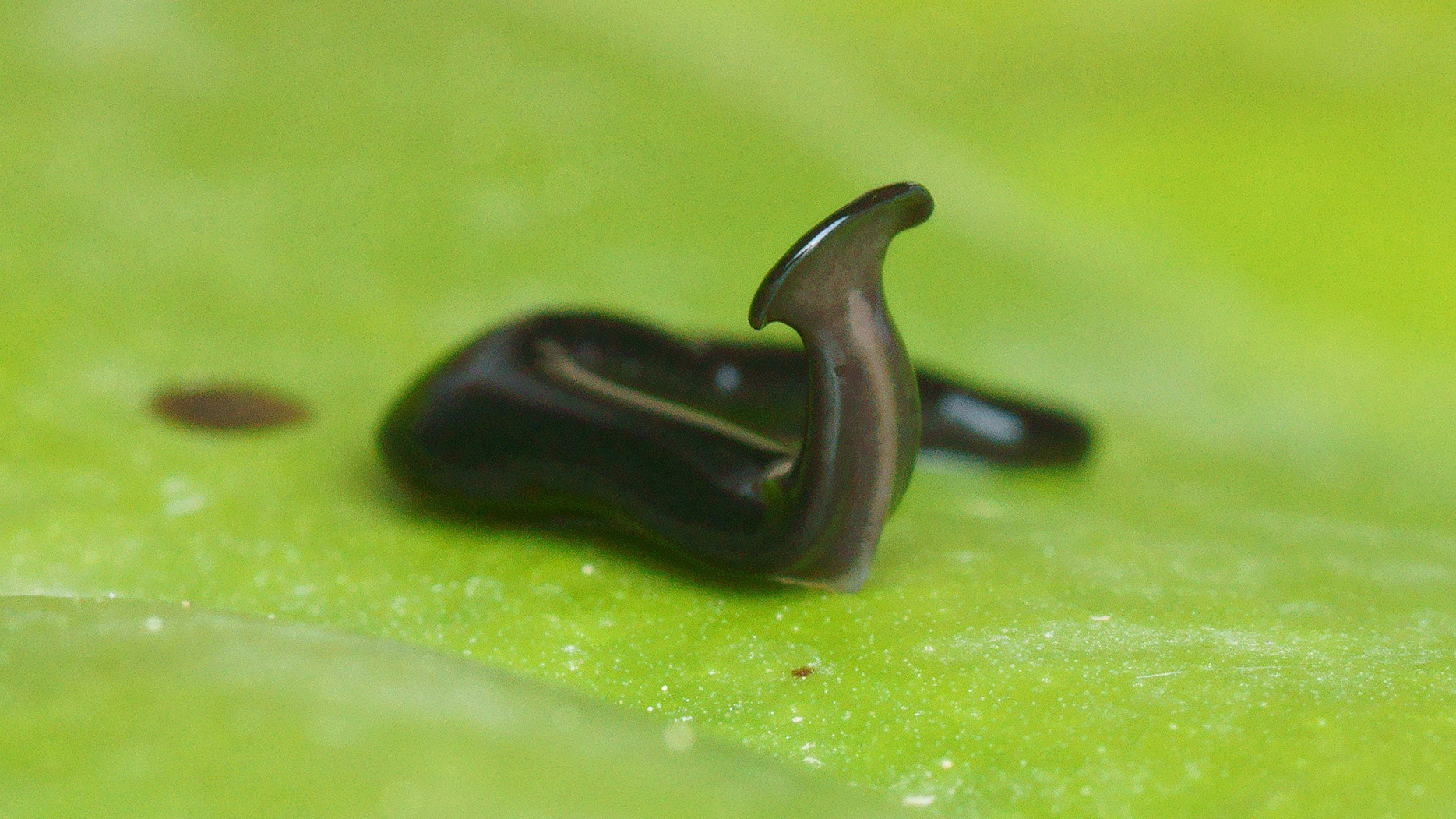
- Vermiviatum covidum

Scientific classification
- Kingdom: Animalia
- Phylum: Platyhelminthes
- Order: Tricladida
- Family: Geoplanidae
- Genus: Vermiviatum
- Species: V. covidum

Binomial name
- Vermiviatum covidum (Justine, Gastineau, Gros, Gey, Ruzzier, Charles & Winsor, 2022)

Synonyms
- Diversibipalium "black" of Justine et al., 2018; Humbertium covidum Justine, Gastineau, Gross, Gey, Ruzzier, Charles & Winsor, 2022

= Vermiviatum covidum =

Species of flatworm

Vermiviatum covidum is a species of predatory land flatworm, found in France and Italy. The Holotype specimen is MNHN JL351B.

== Description ==
A video of V. covidum. A scale is shown at the end and is graduated in millimetres

V. covidum is a small hammerhead flatworm, about 20–30 millimetres (0.79–1.18 in) in length. The dorsal face is completely metallic black, without any stripe or ornamentation. The head plate is reniform (kidney-shaped). The ventral surface is light grey–greyish brown with a paler creeping sole. V. covidum has eyes in a triple row around the anterior headplate present dorsalaterally on the headplate ventrally behind the lappets and continuing along the sides of the body in a staggered row posteriorly. A viscid gland is present in the genital pad anterior to the male and female efferent ducts. The efferent canals open into narrow horizontal highly glandular common genital canals.

== Etymology and classification ==
The authors of the species wrote "The specific name covidum was chosen as homage to the numerous casualties worldwide of the COVID-19 pandemic. Furthermore, a large part of this study was written during the lockdowns."

The species was initially mentioned as Diversibipalium "black" in 2018, when the authors of a study on hammerhead flatworms had only a few available specimens and could not complete an anatomical study. At this time, the species was assigned to the genus Diversibipalium Kawakatsu et al., 2002, a collective group created to accommodate species whose anatomy of the copulatory apparatus is still unknown, and was not given a Latin species name, hence "black", a simple adjective. It was formally described as a new species in 2022 when more specimens were available (mainly from Italy) and was assigned to genus Humbertium on the basis of the anatomy of its copulatory apparatus. The study also included a comparison with several land flatworms of the subfamily Bipaliinae, including the description and comparison of the complete mitochondrial genomes in several species.

In 2023, a new phylogenetic study on Bipaliinae included a redescription of the genus Humbertium and, according to the new diagnosis and data from molecular phylogenetics, Humbertium covidum did not fit into the genus and a new genus, Vermiviatum, was erected to include this species. The name Vermiviatum is derived from Latin vermis, worm, and viator, voyager, and refers to the occurrence of V. covidum outside the native range of the subfamily Bipaliinae.

== Distribution and origin ==
Vermiviatum covidum was described from specimens collected in two localities in the Pyrénées-Atlantiques, a department in the southwest corner of France, and specimens collected in one locality in Veneto, in northeastern Italy. It was also probably recorded (under its synonym Diversibipalium "black") near Rome, Italy.

The origin of the species is unknown, but since most of hammerhead flatworms originate from Asia, the authors of the study wrote that it was "probably a species originating from Asia and an alien species in Europe". A few records of specimens resembling V. covidum were found in the literature, in China, eastern Russia, and Japan, but these records could not be assigned to the species with certainty in the absence of specimens and molecular information.

== Genetics and phylogenetic relationships ==
The mitochondrial genome of Italian specimens of V. covidum, is circular, 15,540 base pairs long and contains 12 protein coding genes, two ribosomal RNA genes and 21 transfer RNA genes. The ND3 gene was found with a premature stop codon. In French specimens, the characteristics were similar but the length was 15,989 base pairs. A comparative study of the Cytochrome c oxidase subunit I gene, widely used for DNA barcoding, found that the sequences from France and Italy differed by 2.58%, a distance compatible with intraspecific differences.
