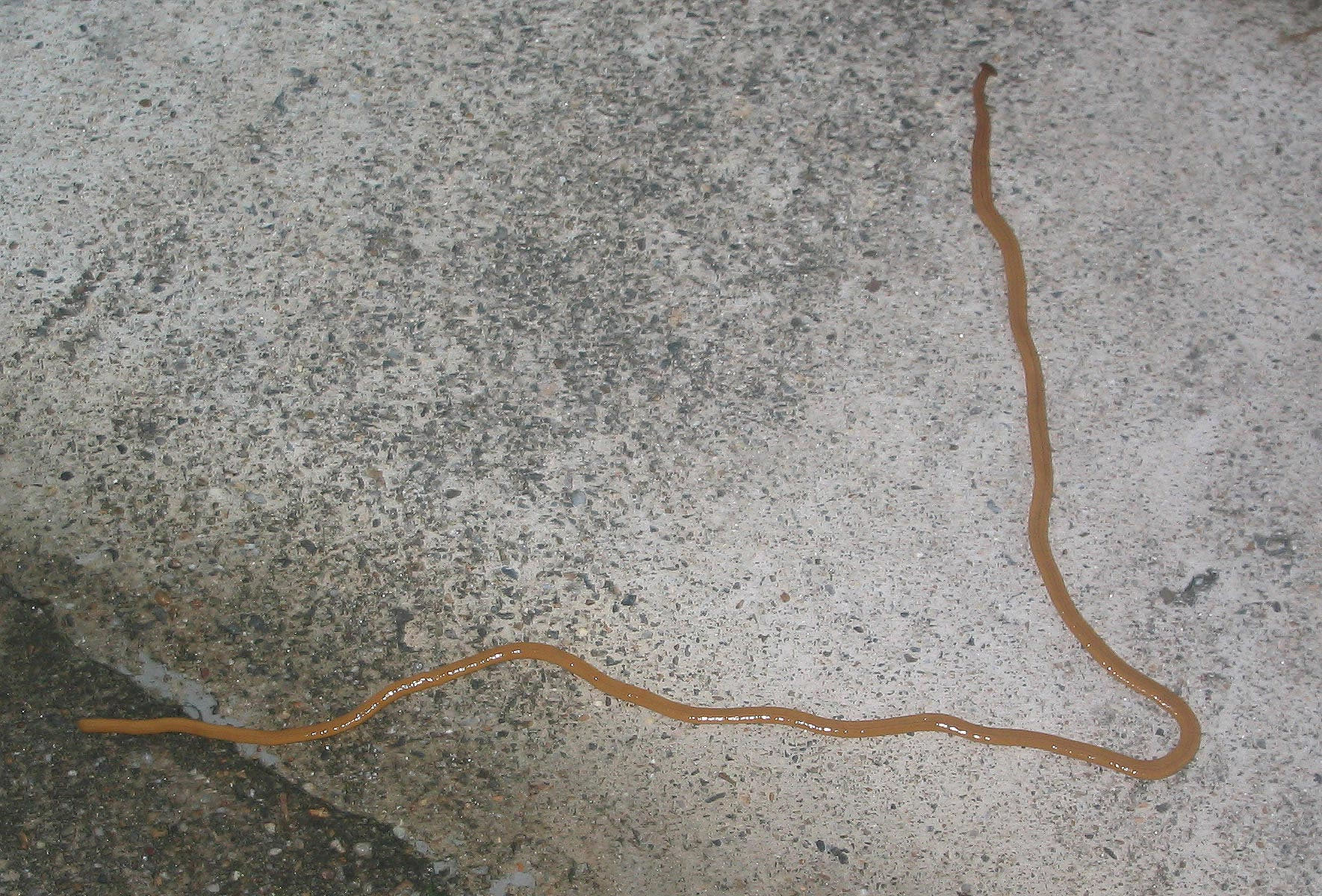

Scientific classification
- Kingdom: Animalia
- Phylum: Platyhelminthes
- Order: Tricladida
- Family: Geoplanidae
- Genus: Bipalium
- Species: B. nobile

Binomial name
- Bipalium nobile Kawakatsu & Makino, 1982

= Bipalium nobile =

Species of flatworm

Bipalium nobile is a species of land planarian in the subfamily Bipaliinae. It is found in Japan.

== Description ==
Bipalium nobile is a very long planarian, reaching up to 1 m (3.3 ft) in length. As in other species of the genus Bipalium, the head is expanded, being fan-shaped in live animals. The dorsal color is pale yellowish brown with five blackish brown longitudinal stripes. The head is usually darker than the rest of the body.

== Ecology ==
Little is known about the ecology of B. nobile. The species started to be found in Tokyo by the end of the 1970s. As it was not reported in previous surveys in the area, it is assumed to be introduced from elsewhere.

Studies on regeneration have shown that B. nobile has a great regenerative ability similar to that of freshwater planarians.
