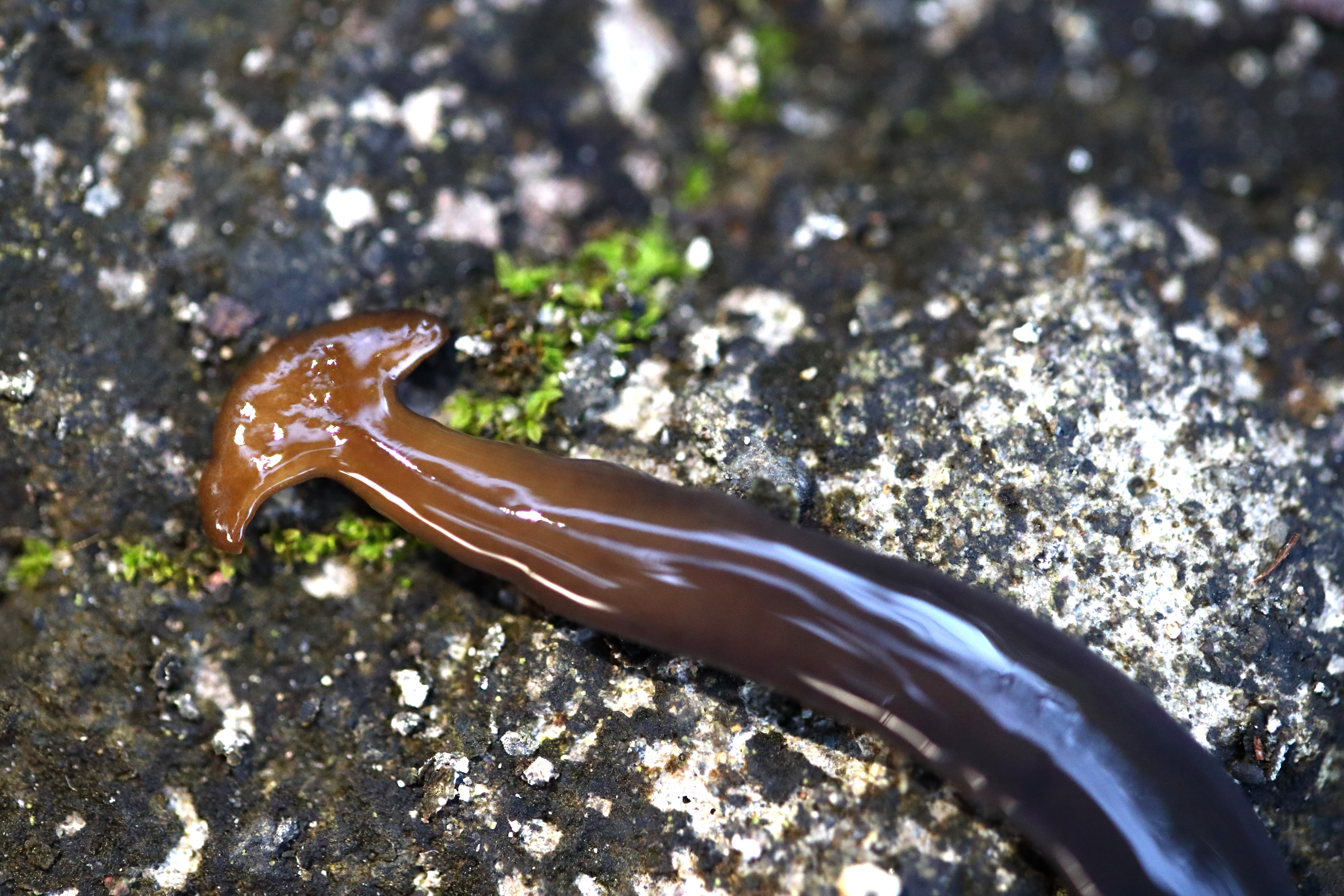
- The head of a Bipalium fuscatum

Scientific classification
- Kingdom: Animalia
- Phylum: Platyhelminthes
- Order: Tricladida
- Family: Geoplanidae
- Genus: Bipalium
- Species: B. fuscatum

Binomial name
- Bipalium fuscatum Stimpson, 1857

= Bipalium fuscatum =

Species of flatworm

Bipalium fuscatum is a species of land planarian first described by William Stimpson in 1857. It has been found in Japan, Indonesia, and in parts of continental South Asia and East Asia such as China, India and Korea. This hammerhead flatworm may be able to survive for days in a human lung as a pseudoparasite. Unlike the two closely related Bipalium nobile and Diversibipalium multilineatum, the Bipalium fuscatum does not segment, and does not reproduce asexually by fragmentation.
