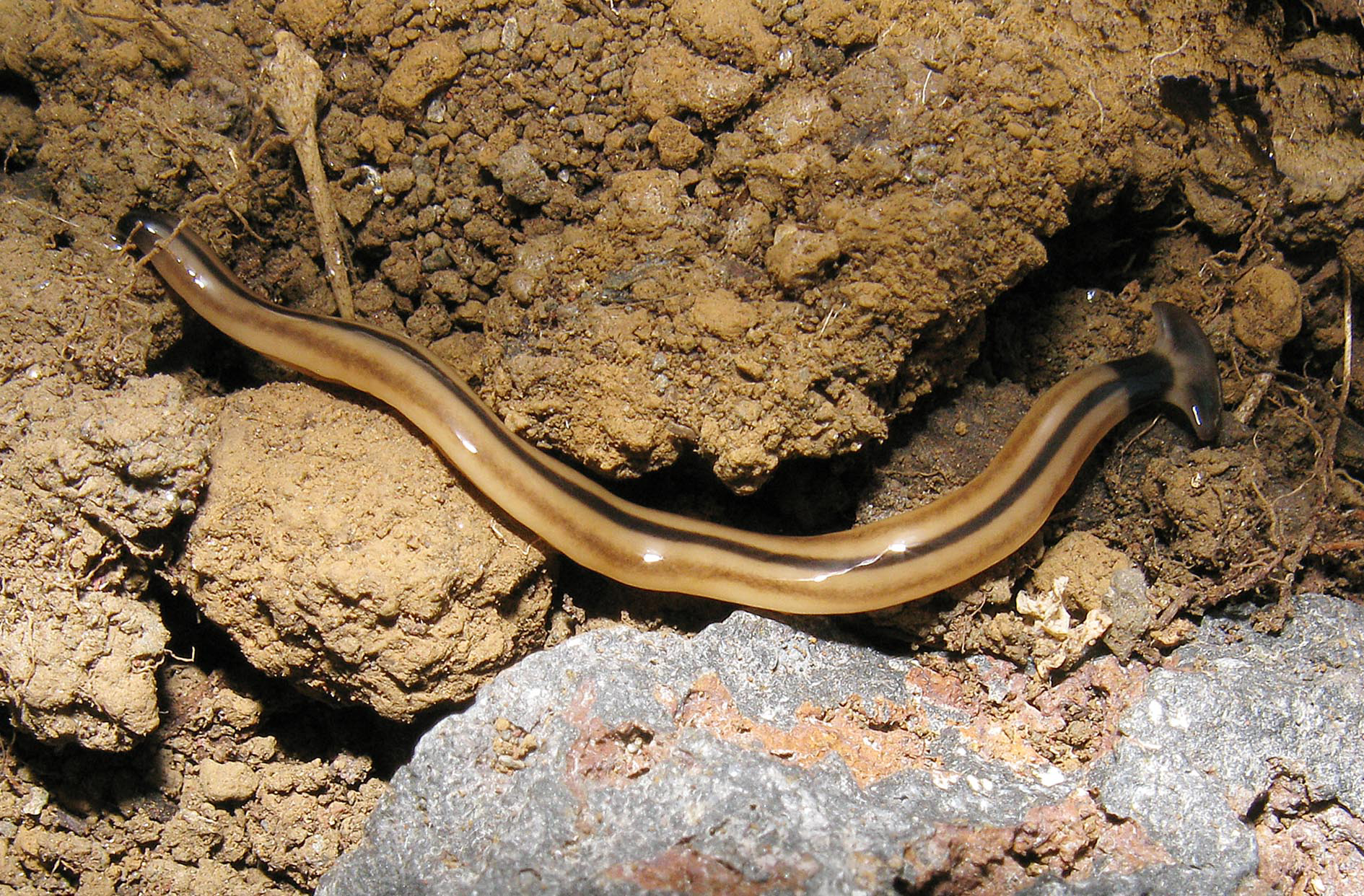
- In La Réunion

Scientific classification
- Kingdom: Animalia
- Phylum: Platyhelminthes
- Order: Tricladida
- Family: Geoplanidae
- Genus: Bipalium
- Species: B. vagum

Binomial name
- Bipalium vagum Jones & Sterrer, 2005

= Bipalium vagum =

Species of flatworm

Bipalium vagum, the wandering hammerhead worm, is a land planarian in the subfamily Bipaliinae. It has been accidentally introduced in the United States, Bermuda and various islands in the Caribbean and was recorded for the first time in Europe, in Italy, in 2021.

== Description ==
Bipalium vagum is a relatively small species of Bipalium, measuring about 25 mm (0.98 in) in length. The head varies from entirely black to dark brown with two black patches separated by a lighter ground color. The neck has a black collar interrupted only at the creeping sole. The dorsal color of the body is light brown and a broad black stripe runs longitudinally from the black collar to the posterior end. Laterally, there are two diffuse dark brown stripes.

== Feeding Habits ==
Differently from other species of Bipalium, which feed on earthworms, B. vagum seems to feed exclusively on gastropods. As it seems to be spreading throughout the Caribbean and southern United States, there is certain concern on its possible impacts on the native gastropod fauna.

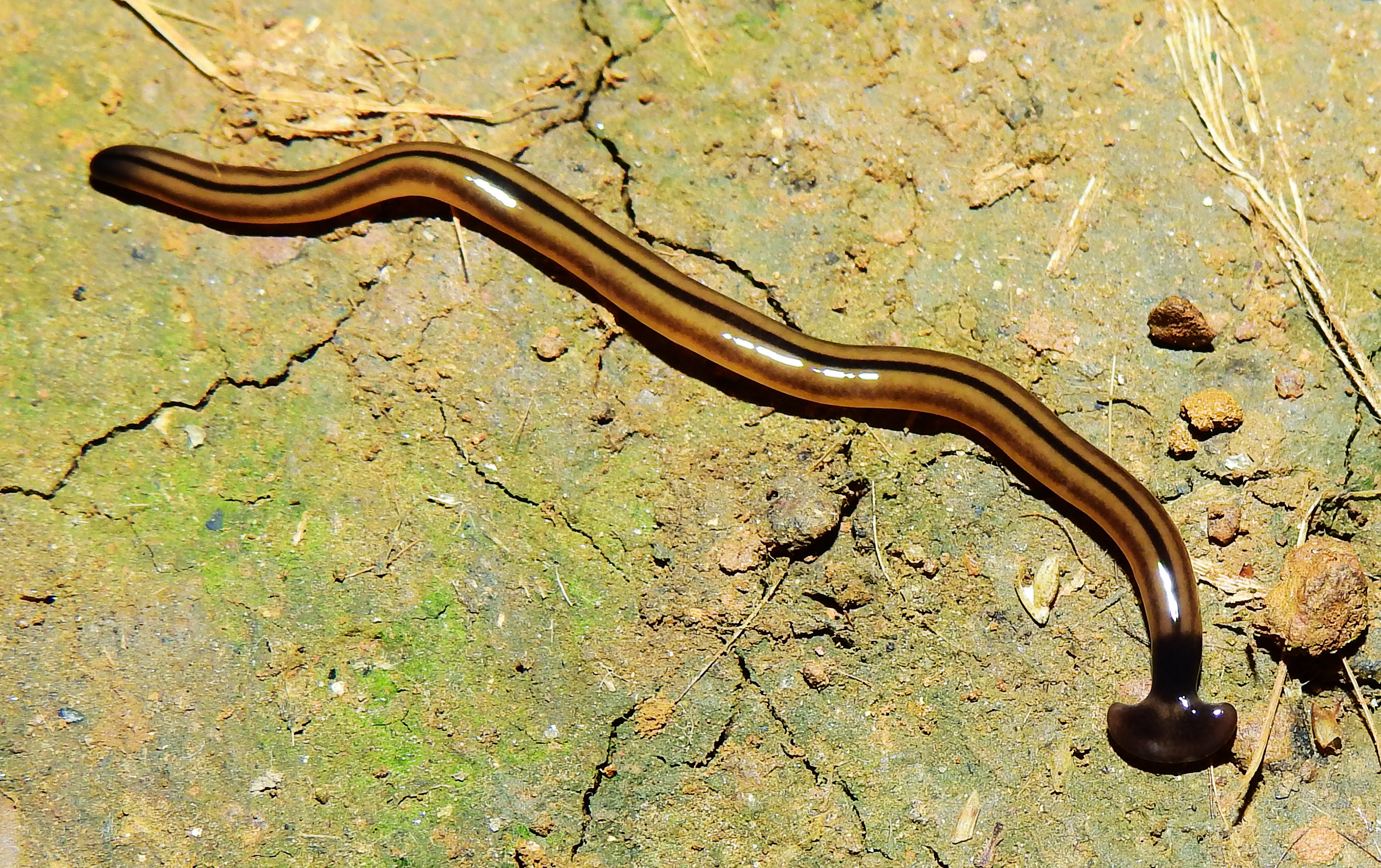
Bipalium vagum from French Guiana

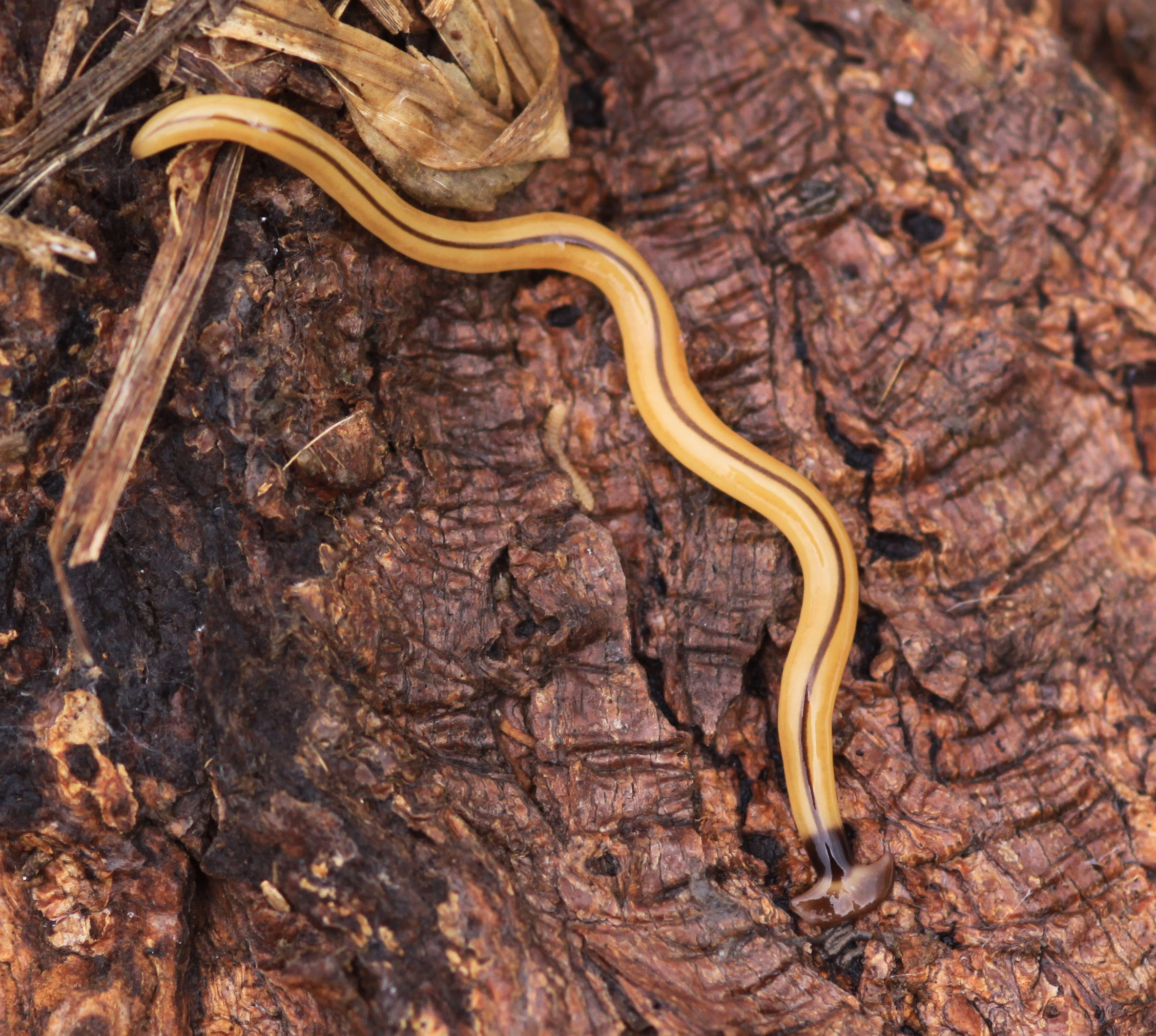
Bipalium vagum from Guadeloupe

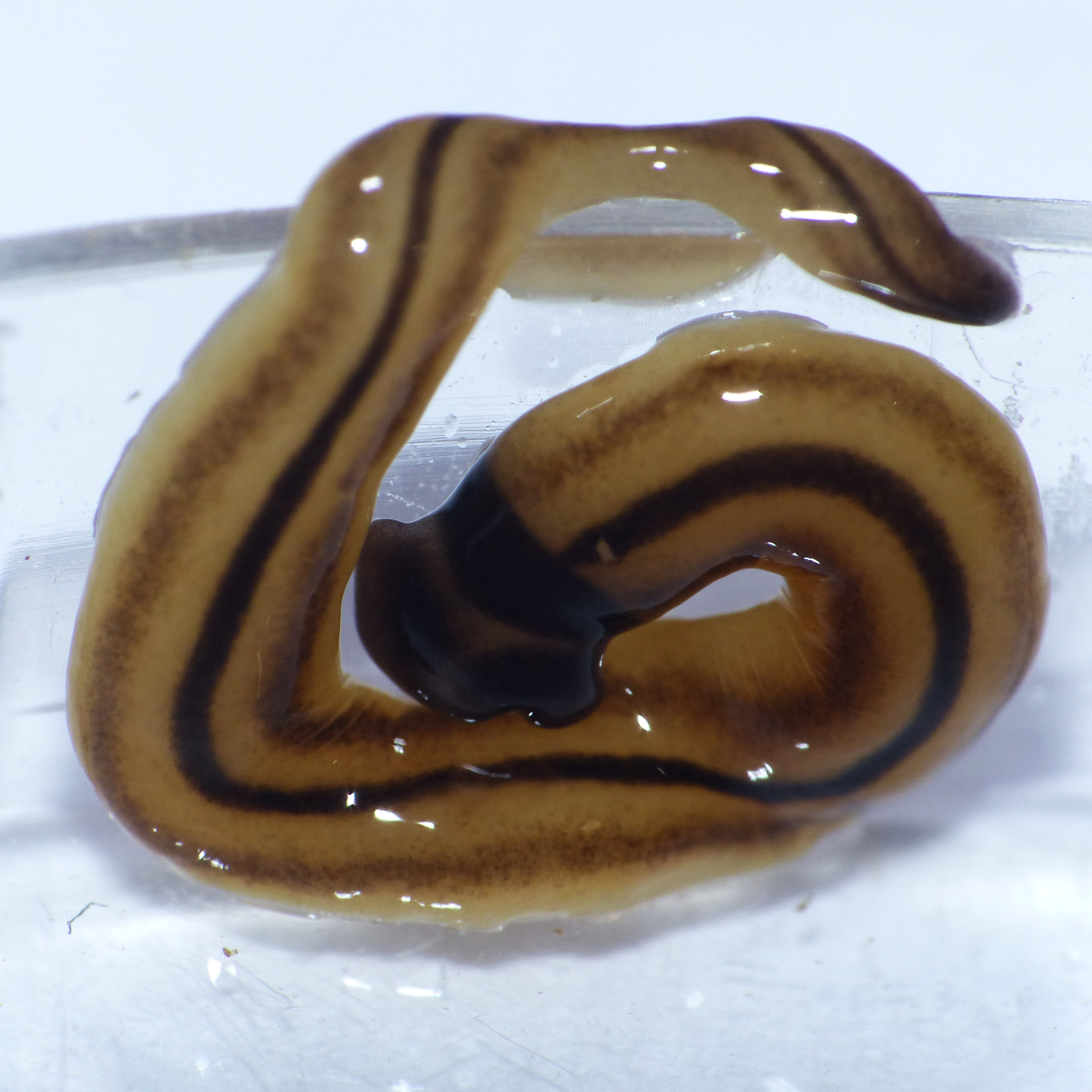
Bipalium vagum from Martinique
