= Bipalium adensameri =

Scientific classification
- Kingdom: Animalia
- Phylum: Platyhelminthes
- Order: Tricladida
- Family: Geoplanidae
- Genus: Bipalium
- Species: B. adensameri

Binomial name
- Bipalium adensameri Graff, 1899

Species of planarian

Bipalium adensameri is a species of predatory land planarian. It has been found on Java in Indonesia as well as in Vietnam.
