= Novibipalium =

Scientific classification
- Kingdom: Animalia
- Phylum: Platyhelminthes
- Order: Tricladida
- Family: Geoplanidae
- Subfamily: Bipaliinae
- Genus: Novibipalium; Kawakatsu, Ogren & Froehlich, 1998

Type species
- Bipalium trifuscostriatum Kaburaki, 1922

Genus of flatworms

Novibipalium is a genus of land planarians of the subfamily Bipaliinae (hammerhead flatworms).

== Description ==
Species of Novibipalium are very similar to those of the related genus Bipalium. The main difference occurs in the copulatory apparatus, which in Novibipalium lacks a well-developed penis papilla, while in Bipalium a penis papilla is present. Novibipalium has a set of folds in the copulatory apparatus that are everted during mating and create a temporary penis.

== Species ==
The genus Novibipalium contains the following species:

- Novibipalium alterifuscatum Kawakatsu, Ogren & Froehlich, 1998
- Novibipalium falsifuscatum Kawakatsu, Ogren & Froehlich, 1998
- Novibipalium koreanum Song & Carbayo, 2025
- Novibipalium miyukiae Kawakatsu, Sluys & Ogren, 2005
- Novibipalium murayamai Kawakatsu, Sluys & Ogren, 2005
- Novibipalium pseudophallicum (de Beauchamp, 1925)
- Novibipalium rhynchophorum Solà & Sluys, 2023
- Novibipalium trifuscostriatum (Kaburaki, 1922)
- Novibipalium venosum (Kaburaki, 1922)
