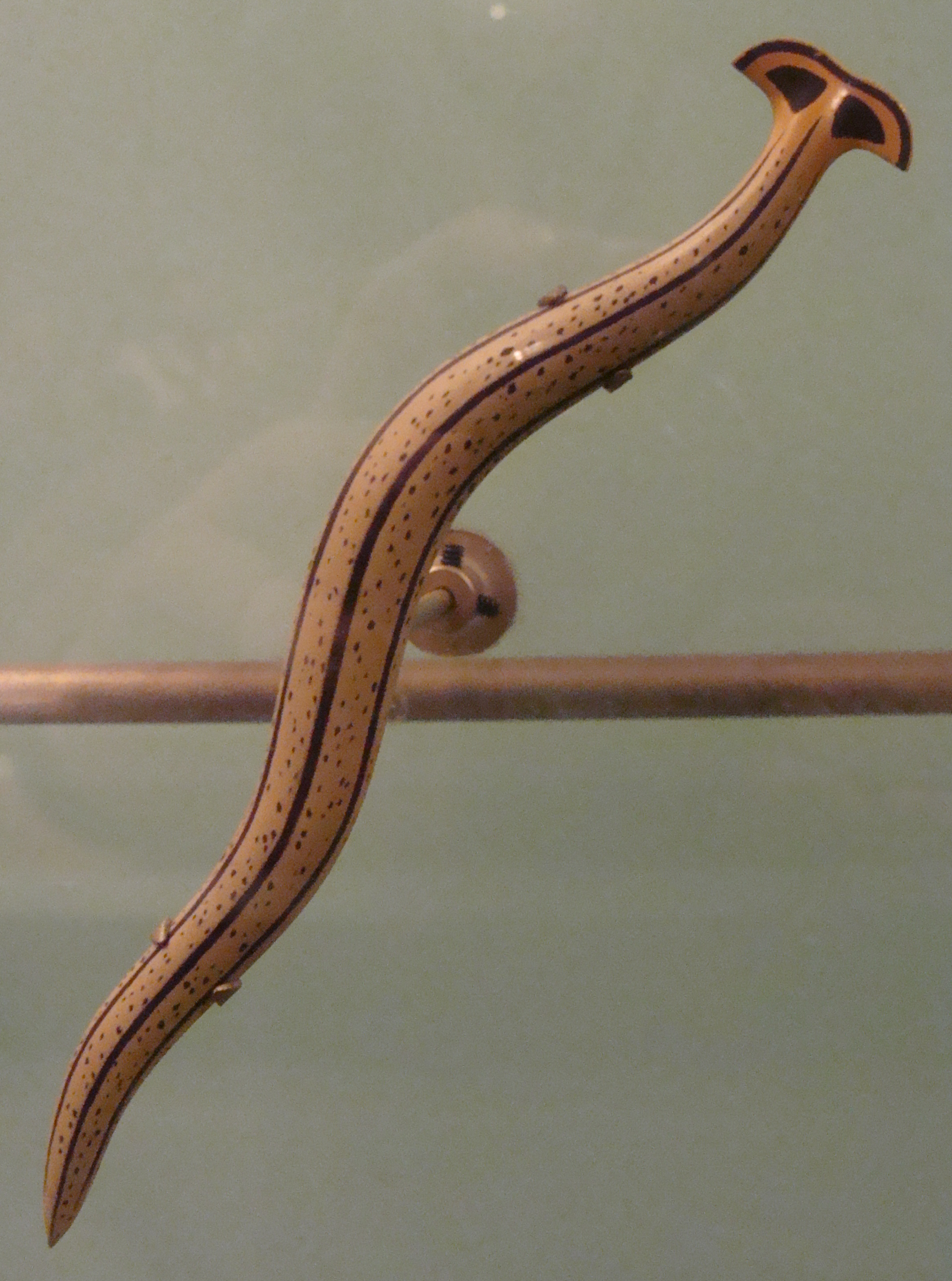
- Model of Bipalium strubelli

Scientific classification
- Kingdom: Animalia
- Phylum: Platyhelminthes
- Order: Tricladida
- Family: Geoplanidae
- Subfamily: Bipaliinae
- Genus: Bipalium; Stimpson, 1857

Type species
- Bipalium fuscatum Stimpson, 1857

Synonyms
- Sphyrocephalus Schmarda, 1859; Dunlopea Wright, 1860; Bipaliura Stimpson, 1861; Perocephalus von Graff, 1896 (in part); Placocephalus von Graff, 1896 (in part); Sphaerocephalus Loman, 1888

= Bipalium =

Genus of flatworms

Bipalium is a genus of large, predatory land planarians. They are often loosely called "hammerhead worms" or "broadhead planarians" because of the distinctive shape of their head region. Land planarians are unique in that they possess a "creeping sole", a highly ciliated region on the ventral epidermis that helps them to creep over the substrate. Native to Asia, several species are invasive to the United States, Canada, and Europe. Some studies have begun the investigation of the evolutionary ecology of these planarians.

== Etymology ==
The name Bipalium comes from Latin bi-, "two" + pala, "shovel" or "spade", because species in this genus resemble a pickaxe.

== Description ==
The genus Bipalium was initially defined by Stimpson to include land planarians with the head broadened, forming a head plate. Later, in 1899, Ludwig von Graff divided it into three genera according to the shape of the head:

1. Bipalium: with a well-developed head plate, much broader than long, and with elongated lateral auricles
2. Perocephalus: rudimentary head plate, not much broader than the body
3. Placocephalus: flat head plate with a circular outline

Josef Müller, in 1902, considered that no sufficient anatomical basis existed for this distinction, and reunited them under Bipalium. Later, von Graff accepted Müller's conclusions.

Towards the end of the 20th century, Robert E. Ogren and Masaharu Kawakatsu started a series of publications called "The Land Planarian Index series" in which they reviewed and organized all taxonomic information regarding land planarians. At first, they retained all broad-headed planarians in the genus Bipalium, but later split them into four genera based on the anatomy of the reproductive organs: Bipalium, Novibipalium, Humbertium, and Diversibipalium.

Under this scenario, the genus Bipalium is defined as containing broad-headed land planarians with simple copulatory organs, without accessory ducts or copulatory bursa, and with a fold of tissue separating the male and female exit ducts.

== Feeding habits ==
Bipalium species are predatory. Some species prey on earthworms, while others may also feed on mollusks. These flatworms can track their prey. When captured, earthworms begin to react to the attack, but the flatworm uses the muscles in its body, as well as sticky secretions, to attach itself to the earthworm to prevent escape. The planarians cover, or cap, the prostomium, peristomium, and anterior end to stop the violent reaction by the earthworm.

To feed on their prey, species of Bipalium often evert their pharynges from their mouths, located on the midventral portion of their bodies, and secrete enzymes that begin the digestion of the prey. The liquefied tissues are sucked into the branching gut of the flatworms by ciliary action.

== Reproduction ==
Reproduction in Bipalium may be asexual or sexual and all species are hermaphroditic.

B. adventitium reproduces sexually and creates egg capsules, which hatch around 3 weeks post-deposition. The egg capsules have a tough exterior and generally contain multiple juveniles.

B. kewense have rarely been observed using egg capsules as a primary method of reproduction. Asexual fragmentation is its main reproductive strategy in temperate regions and most individuals never develop sexual organs. Juveniles of this species, unlike B. adventitium, do not appear the same coloration as parents in their early days.

== Toxicity ==
In 2014, the presence of tetrodotoxin, a very dangerous neurotoxin, was recorded in B. adventitium and B. kewense. It is the first record of tetrodotoxin in terrestrial invertebrates.

== Invasive species ==
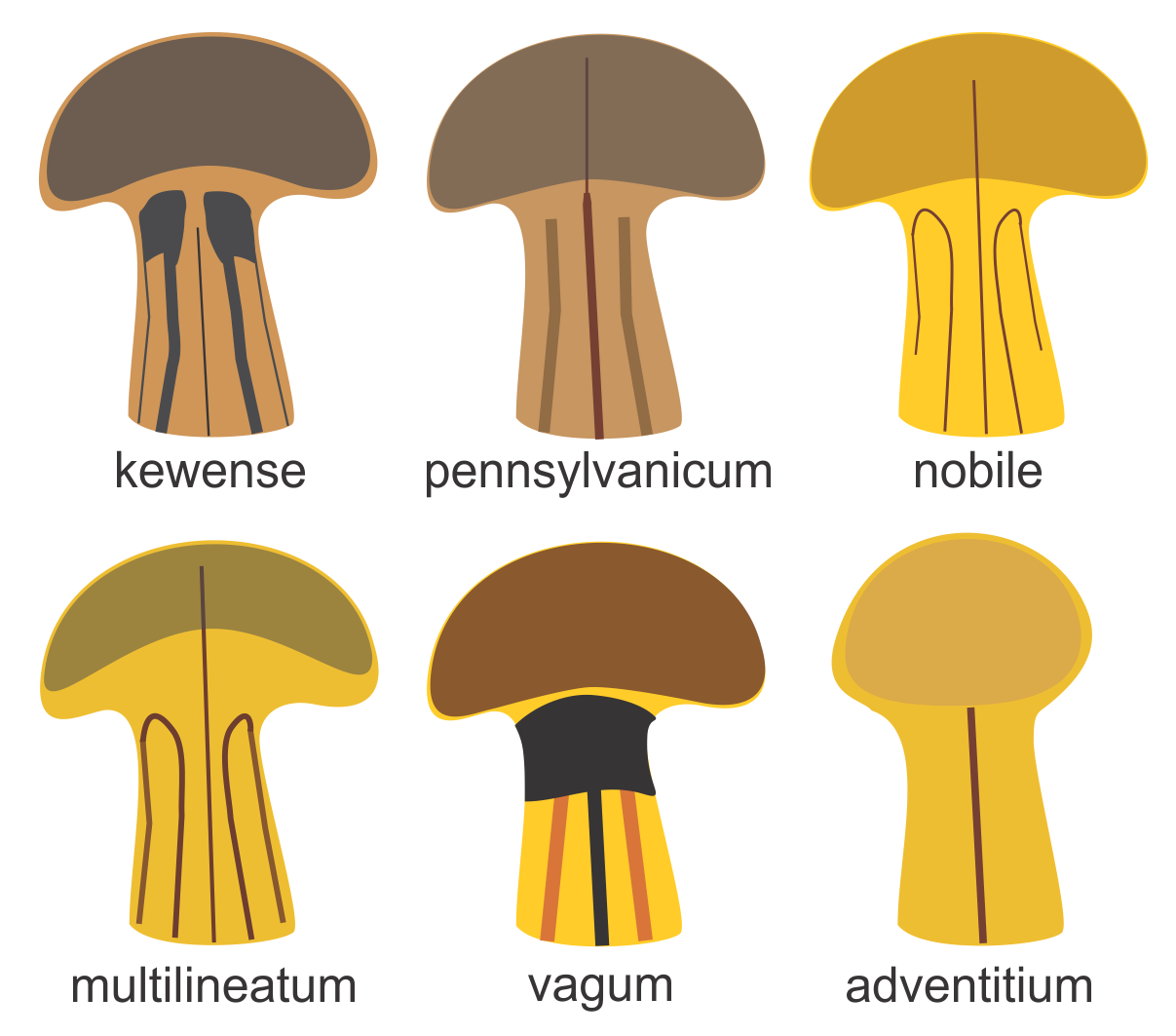
Drawings of the anterior region of 6 species of the genus Bipalium, showing the differences in shape and color. With the exception of B. nobile, they are invasive species in the United States. B. nobile is assumed to be an invasive species in Tokyo, Japan.

Little is known about the ecology of terrestrial planarians, but research has been done on different genera and species, including several native and invasive species in Brazil, Arthurdendyus triangulatus, Rhynchodemus and Bipalium.

As of 2007, four invasive species of Bipalium were known in the United States: B. adventitium, B. kewense, B. pennsylvanicum, and B. vagum. These planarians are thought to have come to the US on infected plants and soil.

Bipalium kewense has been found commonly in American greenhouses since 1901. This species is a voracious predator of earthworms, and has been identified as a nuisance in the southern USA in earthworm-rearing beds. Control of the species is difficult due to the lack of predators. As noted by the University of Florida IFAS department,

Other animals rarely devour land planarians, since surface secretions appear distasteful, if not toxic. Protozoans, including flagellates, ciliates, sporozoans, and nematodes have been detected in land planarians. Because of their cannibalistic habit, land planarians may be their own worst enemy.

Specimens of Bipalium adventitium are characterized by a single dark dorsal stripe. They were first discovered in the US in California and New York but have been found in Illinois as well as most northern states. In 2019, they were discovered in Montreal, Canada. B. kewense have five dark dorsal stripes and a partial dark collar. They have undergone several name changes since their discovery in North America. B. kewense is commonly found across the southern regions of the US. B. kewense is found worldwide in tropical and subtropical regions. Bipalium pennsylvanicum is characterized by its dark brown head and three dorsal stripes. As of 2014, it has only been found in Pennsylvania and in coastal South Carolina. Bipalium vagum is characterized by two dark dorsal blotches on the head, a thick black band around the neck, and three dark dorsal stripes. This species has been found in several Gulf Coast US states, and in 2022, specimens were located extending farther north into Arkansas.

== Image gallery ==
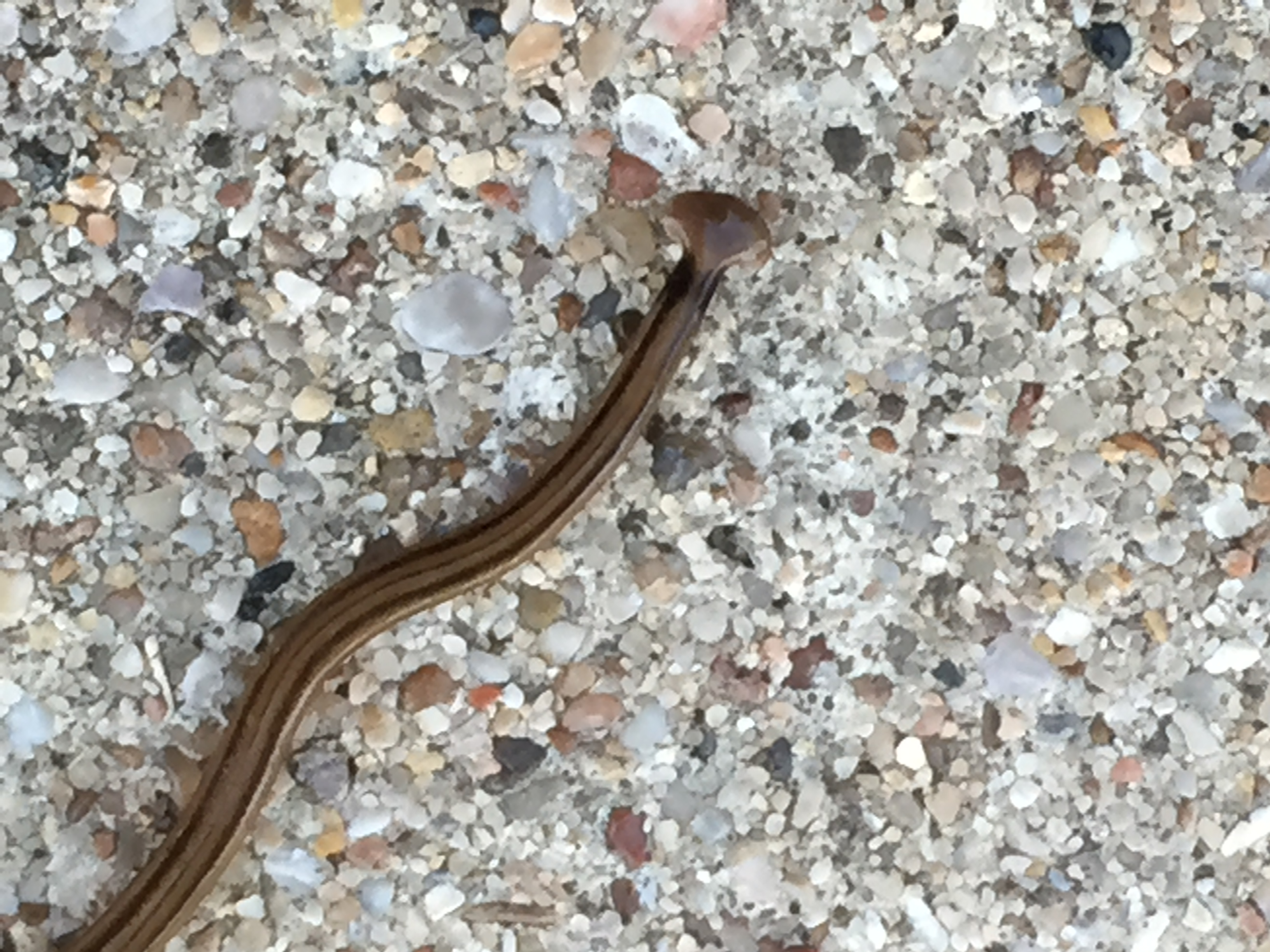
Close up of head of Bipalium kewense

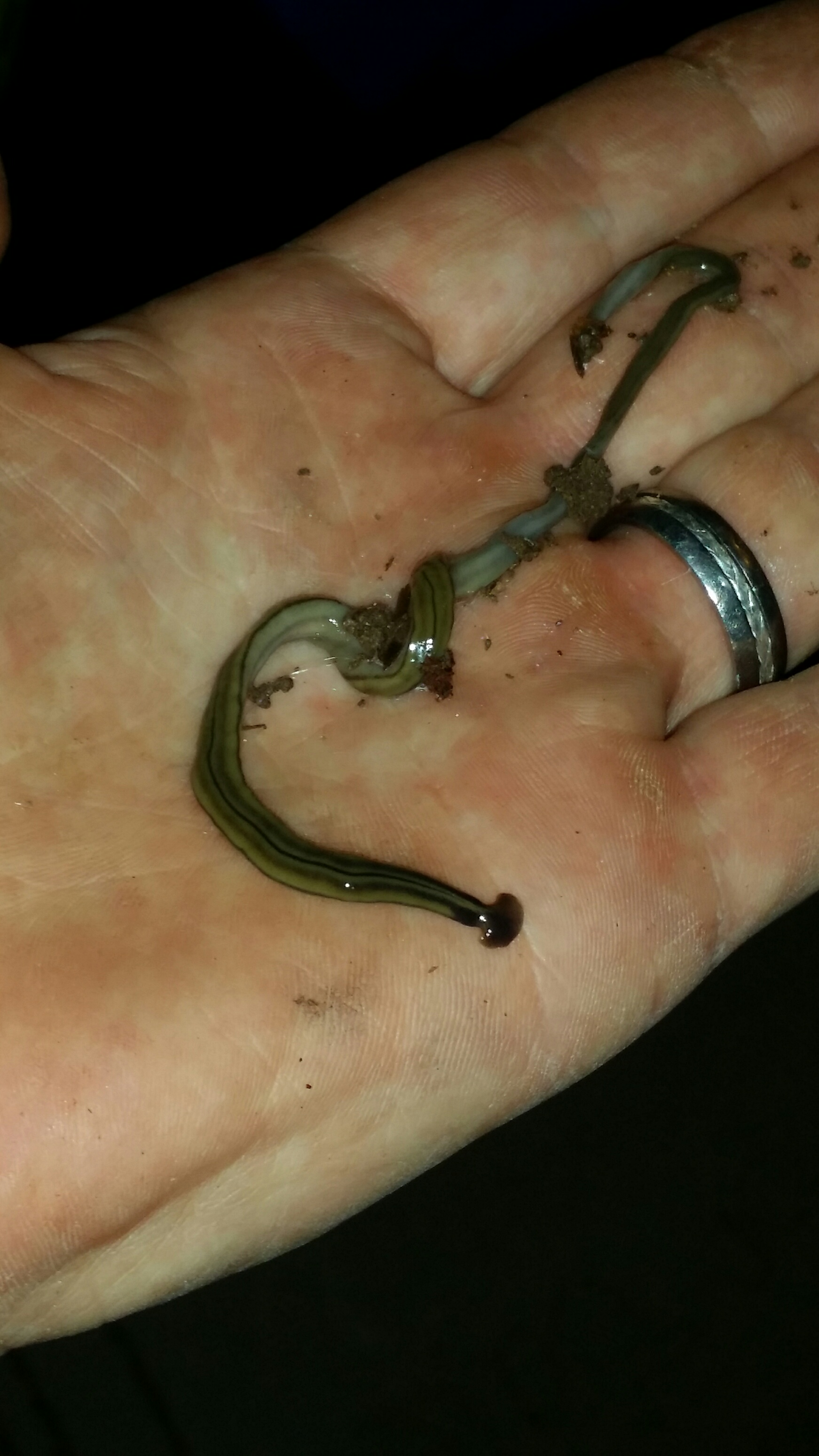
Specimen of Bipalium found in Georgia, United States

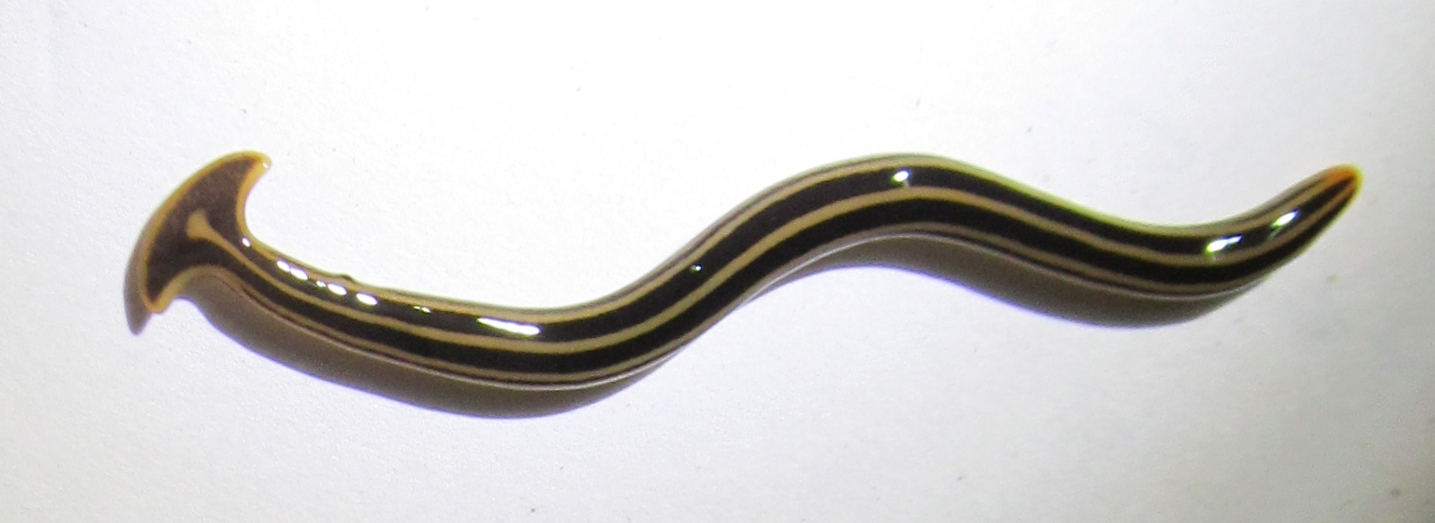
Hammerhead worm found in Kerala, India

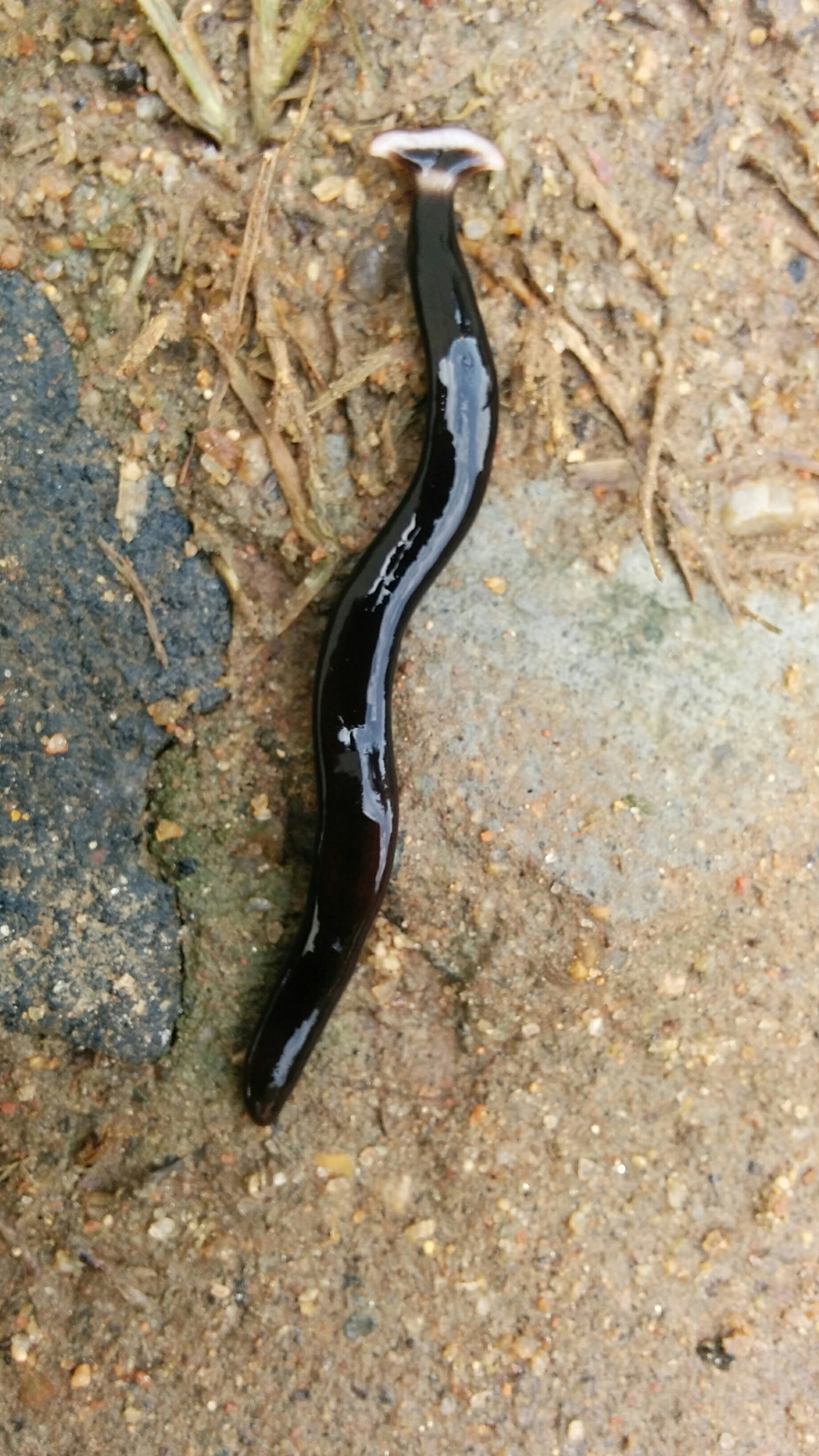
Hammerhead worm found in Chennai and Coimbatore, India

Video of a Bipalium sp. from Mérida, Yucatán, Mexico

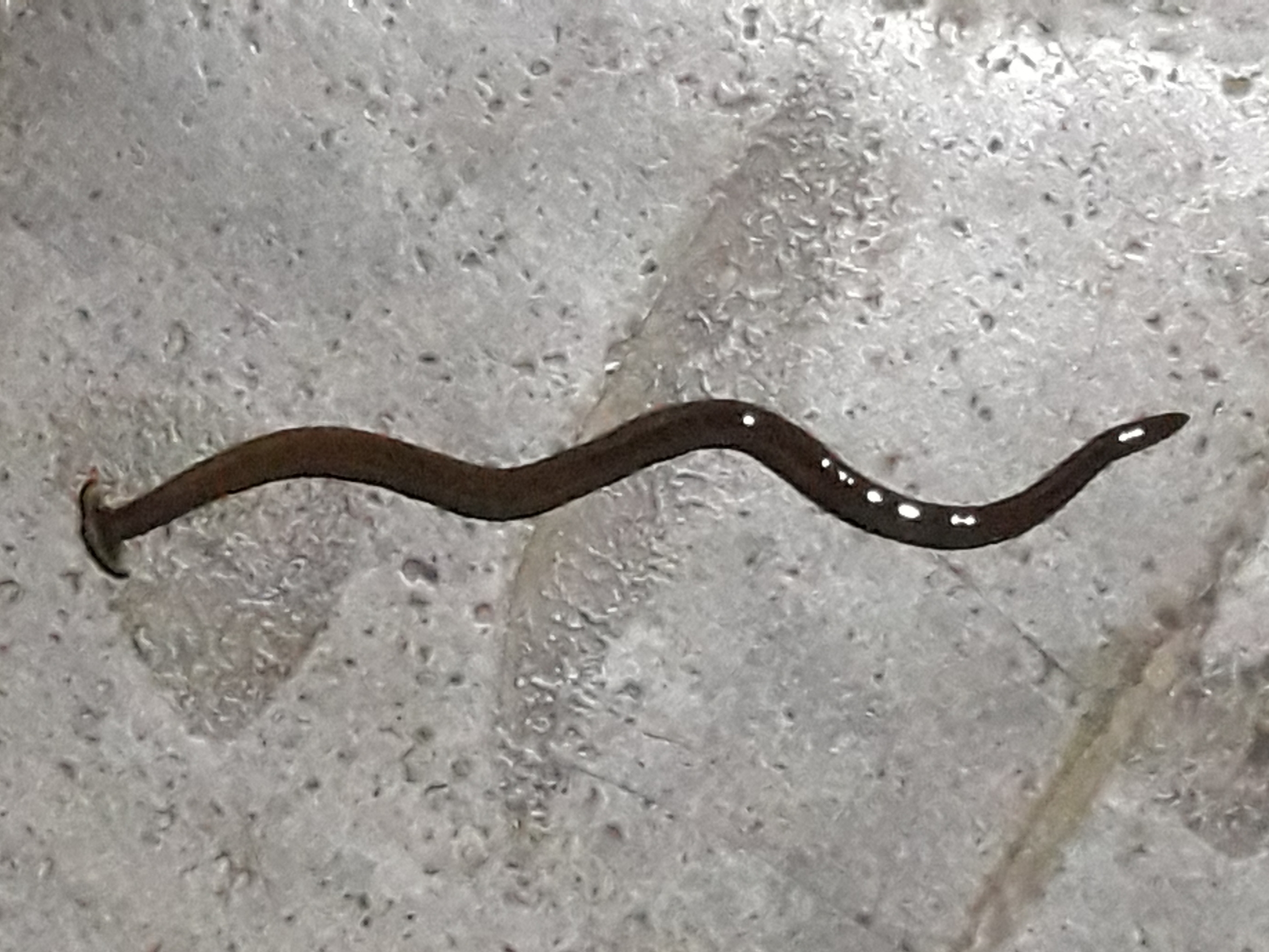
Hammerhead worm seen in Kolkata, India

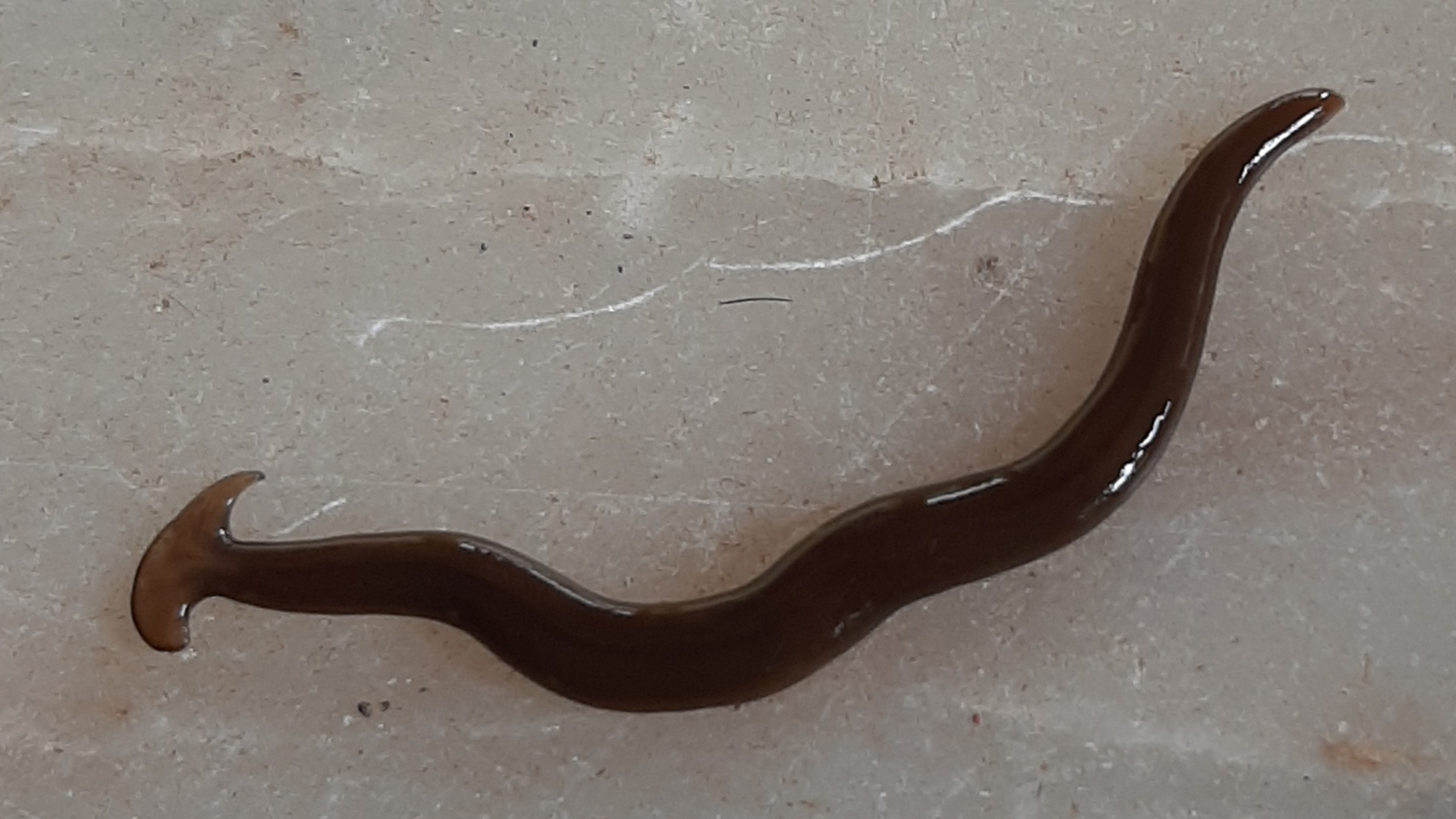
Hammerhead worm found in Kerala, India

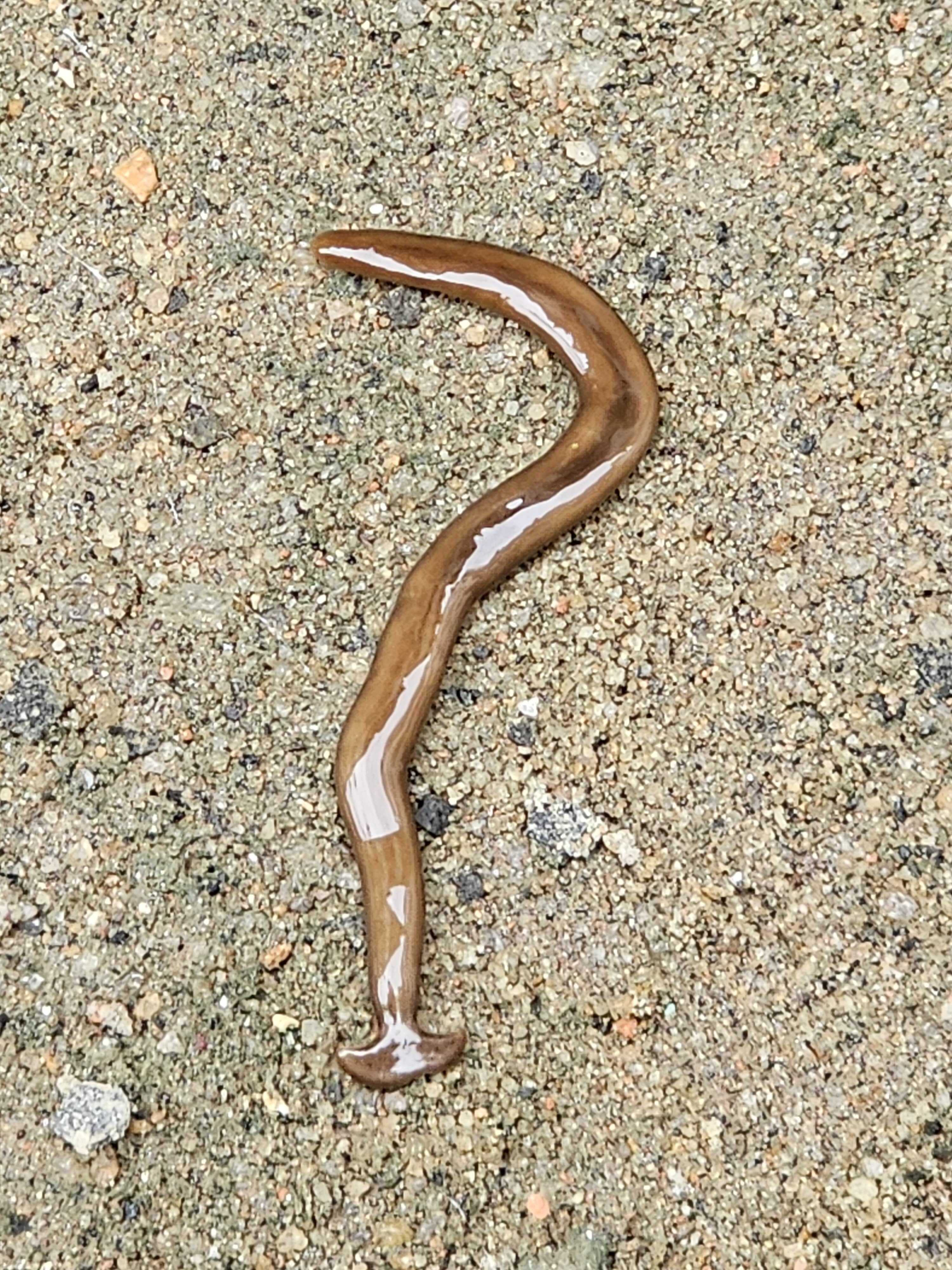
Hammerhead worm found in Bihar, India

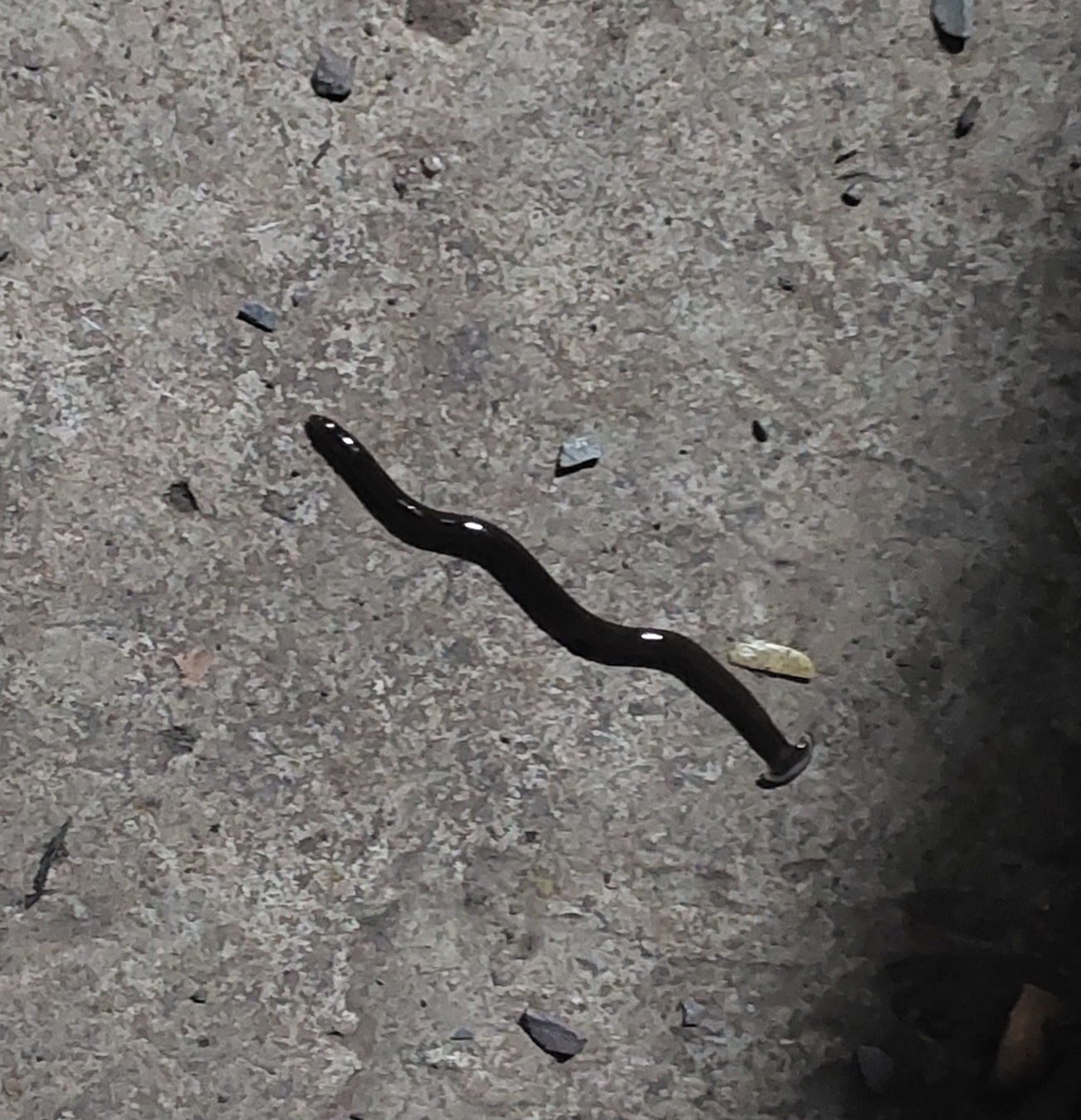
Hammerhead worm found in Chhattisgarh, India

== Species ==
The genus Bipalium currently includes the following species:

- Bipalium adensameri Graff, 1899
- Bipalium admarginatum de Beauchamp, 1933
- Bipalium adventitium Hyman, 1943
- Bipalium albo-coeruleus (Bleeker, 1844)
- Bipalium alternans de Beauchamp, 1930
- Bipalium bengalensis Bhakat, 2020
- Bipalium bergendali (Graff, 1899)
- Bipalium bimaculatum Graff, 1882
- Bipalium chhatarpurensis Chaurasia, 1988
- Bipalium choristosperma de Beauchamp, 1925
- Bipalium costaricensis Hyman, 1939
- Bipalium crassatrium de Beauchamp, 1939
- Bipalium distinguendum Müller, 1907
- Bipalium dubium Loman, 1890
- Bipalium fuscatum Stimpson, 1857
- Bipalium fuscolineatum Kaburaki, 1922
- Bipalium gestroi Graff, 1894
- Bipalium glandiantrum Kawakatsu, Sluys & Ogren, 2005
- Bipalium glandulosa (de Beauchamp, 1925)
- Bipalium glaucum (Kaburaki, 1922)
- Bipalium gracilis (Loman, 1890)
- Bipalium graffi Müller, 1902
- Bipalium gwangneungensis Song & Carbayo, 2025
- Bipalium haberlandti Graff, 1899
- Bipalium hilgendorfi Graff, 1899
- Bipalium janseni Graff, 1899
- Bipalium javanum Loman, 1883
- Bipalium kaburakii Kawakatsu, Sluys & Ogren, 2005
- Bipalium katoi Kawakatsu, Sluys & Ogren, 2005
- Bipalium kewense Moseley, 1878
- Bipalium kisoense Kaburaki, 1922
- Bipalium kraepelini Ritter-Zahony R., 1905
- Bipalium manubriatum Sharp, 1891
- Bipalium marginatum Loman, 1888
- Bipalium mjobergi de Beauchamp, 1925
- Bipalium mondimentum Kaburaki, 1922
- Bipalium monolineatum Kaburaki, 1922
- Bipalium moseleyi Loman, 1888
- Bipalium muninense Kawakatsu, Sluys & Ogren, 2005
- Bipalium myadenosium de Beauchamp, 1939
- Bipalium nigrum (Ritter-Zahony, 1905)
- Bipalium nobile Kawakatsu & Makino, 1982
- Bipalium ochroleucum Kaburaki, 1922
- Bipalium pennsylvanicum Ogren, 1987
- Bipalium penrissenicum Kawakatsu, Ogren & Froehlich, 1998
- Bipalium persephone de Beauchamp, 1939
- Bipalium poiense de Beauchamp, 1925
- Bipalium rhytidoantrum Solà & Sluys, 2023
- Bipalium rigaudi Graff, 1894
- Bipalium robiginosum Graff, 1899
- Bipalium rugiantrum Solà & Sluys, 2023
- Bipalium semperi (Graff, 1899)
- Bipalium simrothi Loman, 1895
- Bipalium strubelli Graff, 1899
- Bipalium sudzukii Kawakatsu, 1987
- Bipalium sylvestre Kapadia, 1947
- Bipalium tetsuyai Kawakatsu, Sluys & Ogren, 2005
- Bipalium unistriatus Kuhl & Hasselt, 1822
- Bipalium univittatum Grube, 1866

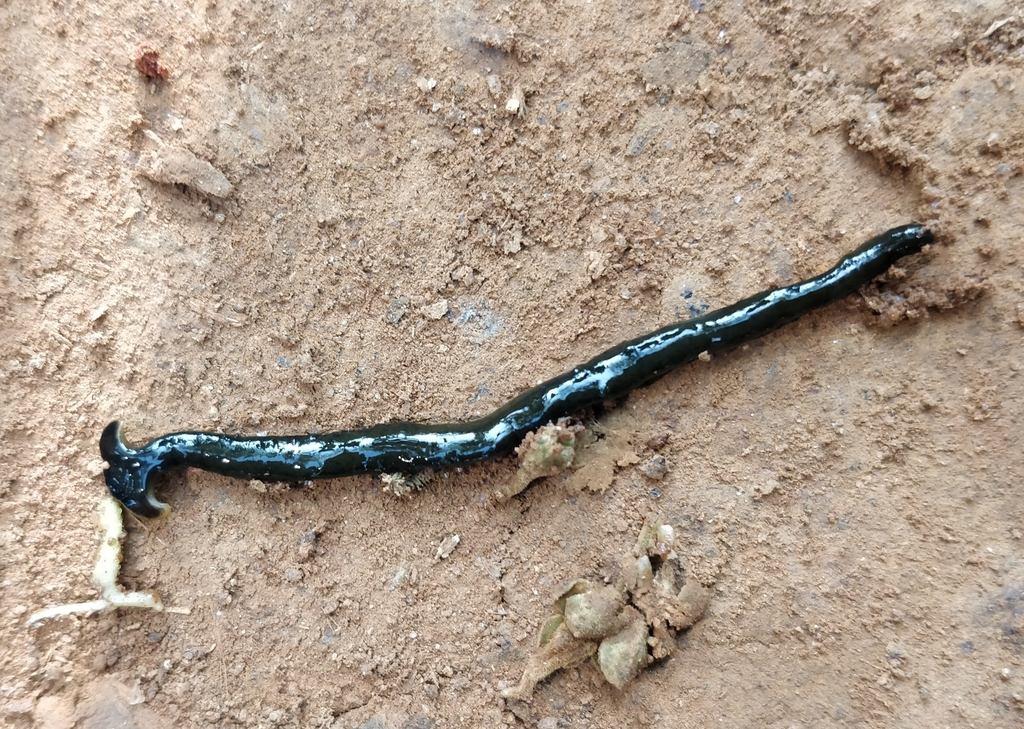
B. univittatum

- Bipalium vagum Jones & Sterrer, 2005
- Bipalium virile Müller, 1902
- Bipalium weismanni Ritter-Zahony, 1905
- Bipalium wiesneri Graff, 1899
- Bipalium somii Chaurasia, 1981
