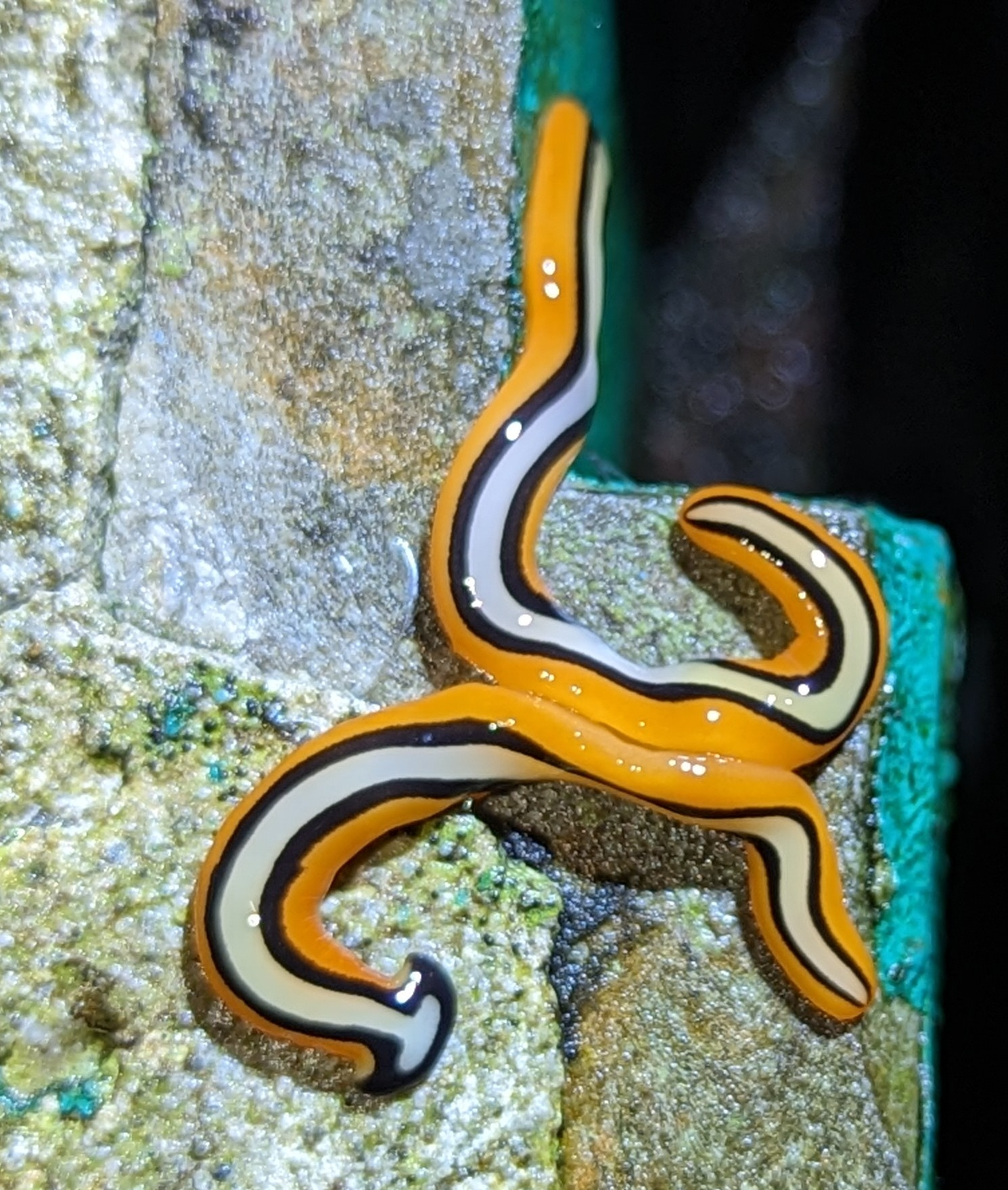

Scientific classification
- Domain: Eukaryota
- Kingdom: Animalia
- Phylum: Platyhelminthes
- Order: Tricladida
- Family: Geoplanidae
- Genus: Bipalium
- Species: B. choristosperma

Binomial name
- Bipalium choristosperma de Beauchamp, 1925

= Bipalium choristosperma =

Species of flatworm

Bipalium choristosperma is a species of predatory land planarian within the family Geoplanidae. The species is native to Malaysia, being found on the northern part of Borneo. The coloration of the species is bright orange, followed by a black line with a white line within running throughout its dorsal body to the head.
