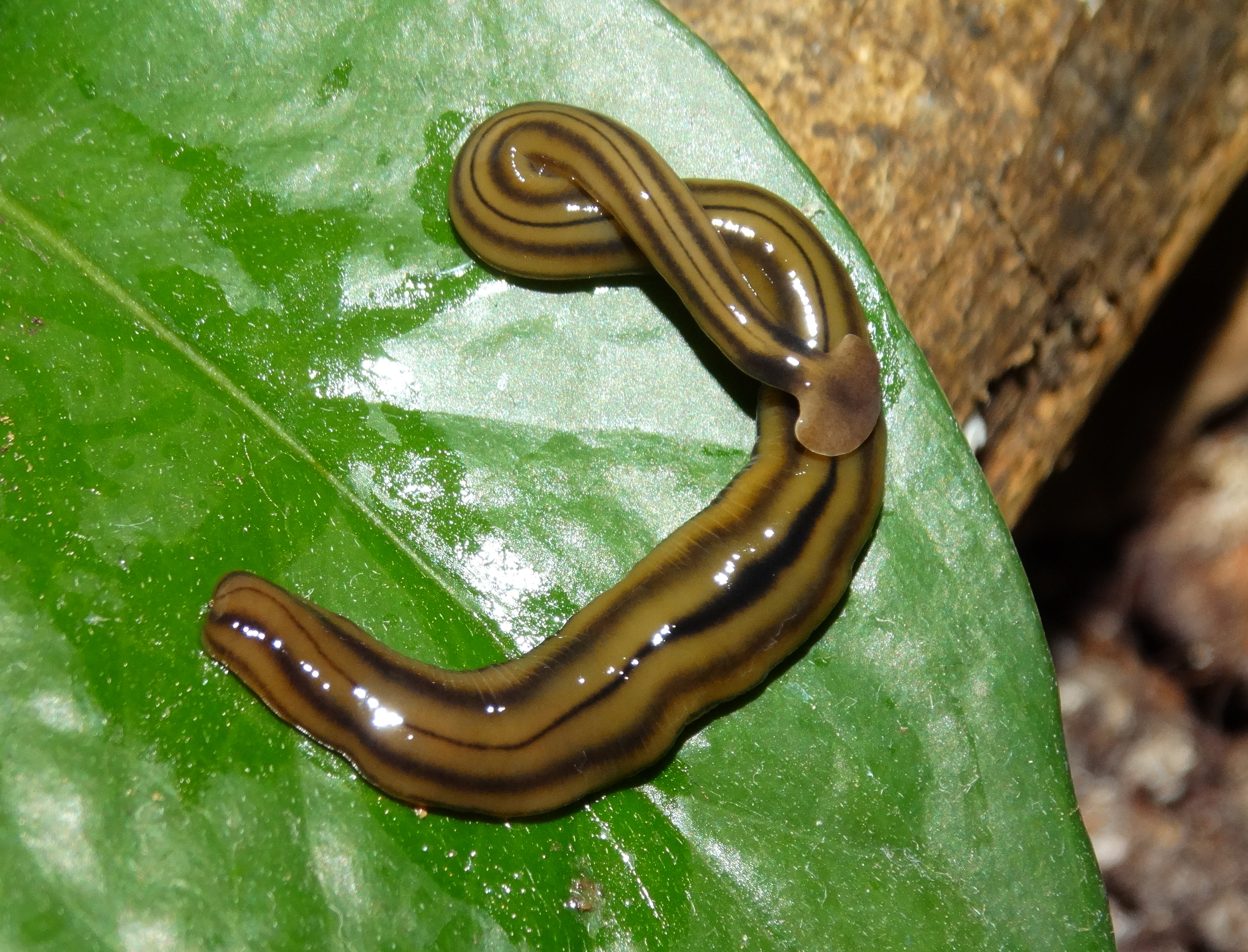

Scientific classification
- Kingdom: Animalia
- Phylum: Platyhelminthes
- Order: Tricladida
- Family: Geoplanidae
- Genus: Bipalium
- Species: B. kewense

Binomial name
- Bipalium kewense Moseley, 1878

Synonyms
- Bipalium manubriatum Sharp, 1891; Sphyrocephalus kewensis Hallez, 1893; Placocephalus kewensis Graff, 1896; Placocephalus isabellinus Geba, 1909; Bipalium costaricense Hyman, 1939

= Bipalium kewense =

Species of flatworm

Bipalium kewense, also known as the shovel-headed garden worm, is a species of large predatory land planarian with a cosmopolitan distribution. It is sometimes referred to as a "hammerhead flatworm" due to its half-moon-shaped head, but this name is also used to refer to other species in the subfamily Bipaliinae.

== Description ==
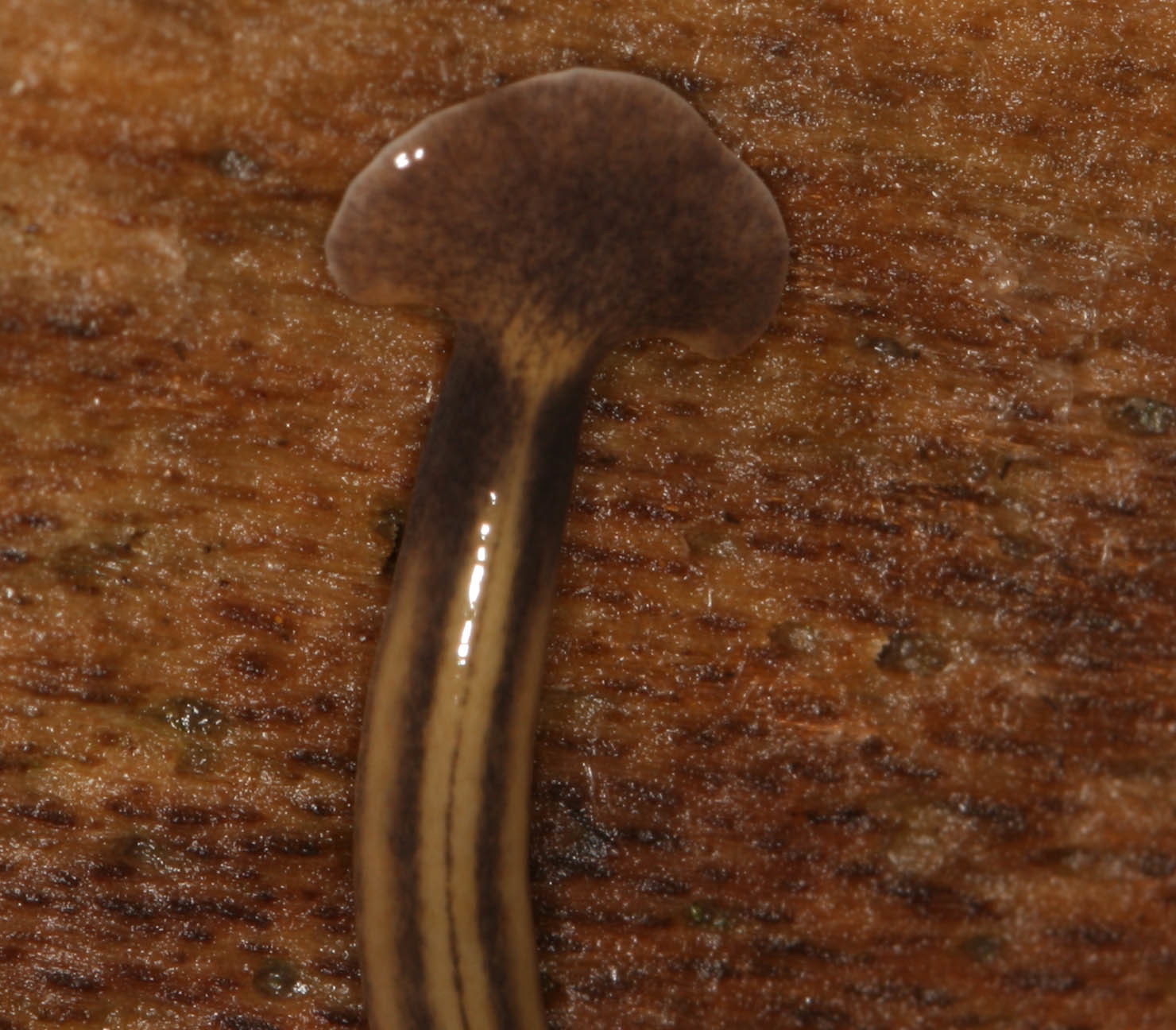
Detail of the anterior region of Bipalium kewense

Bipalium kewense is a very long land planarian. Preserved specimens are up to 20 centimetres in length, and living specimens may be longer.

The anterior end ("head") is expanded in a transversal semilunate shape and the body is the narrowest just behind the head, in a region called "neck". The dorsal color is light-brown with five black to grey longitudinal stripes that begin at the neck. The median and marginal stripes are narrow and black, very distinctly marked. The lateral stripes (between the median and marginal stripes) are usually grey, broad and with diffuse margins. The neck is usually marked by an incomplete black collar formed by the union of the marginal and lateral stripes, this being one of the main characteristics to distinguish it from similar species. The head usually has a darker color than the background color of the dorsum and lacks stripes. The ventral side has a light ochre color externally and whitish over the creeping sole, which is externally lined by two diffuse grey-violet longitudinal lines.

== Distribution ==
Bipalium kewense is believed to be native to Southeast Asia, but currently is found worldwide. It has been reported on every continent aside from Antarctica. It was probably introduced by international plant trade, as it is frequently found associated with plant pots.

The species was first found in 1878 in the area of the Kew Park in the London Borough of Richmond upon Thames, United Kingdom, hence the name kewense.

In the European Union, in order to limit its spread, it is included in the list of invasive alien species of Union concern and hence cannot be imported, bred, transported, commercialized, or intentionally released into the environment in any of its member states.

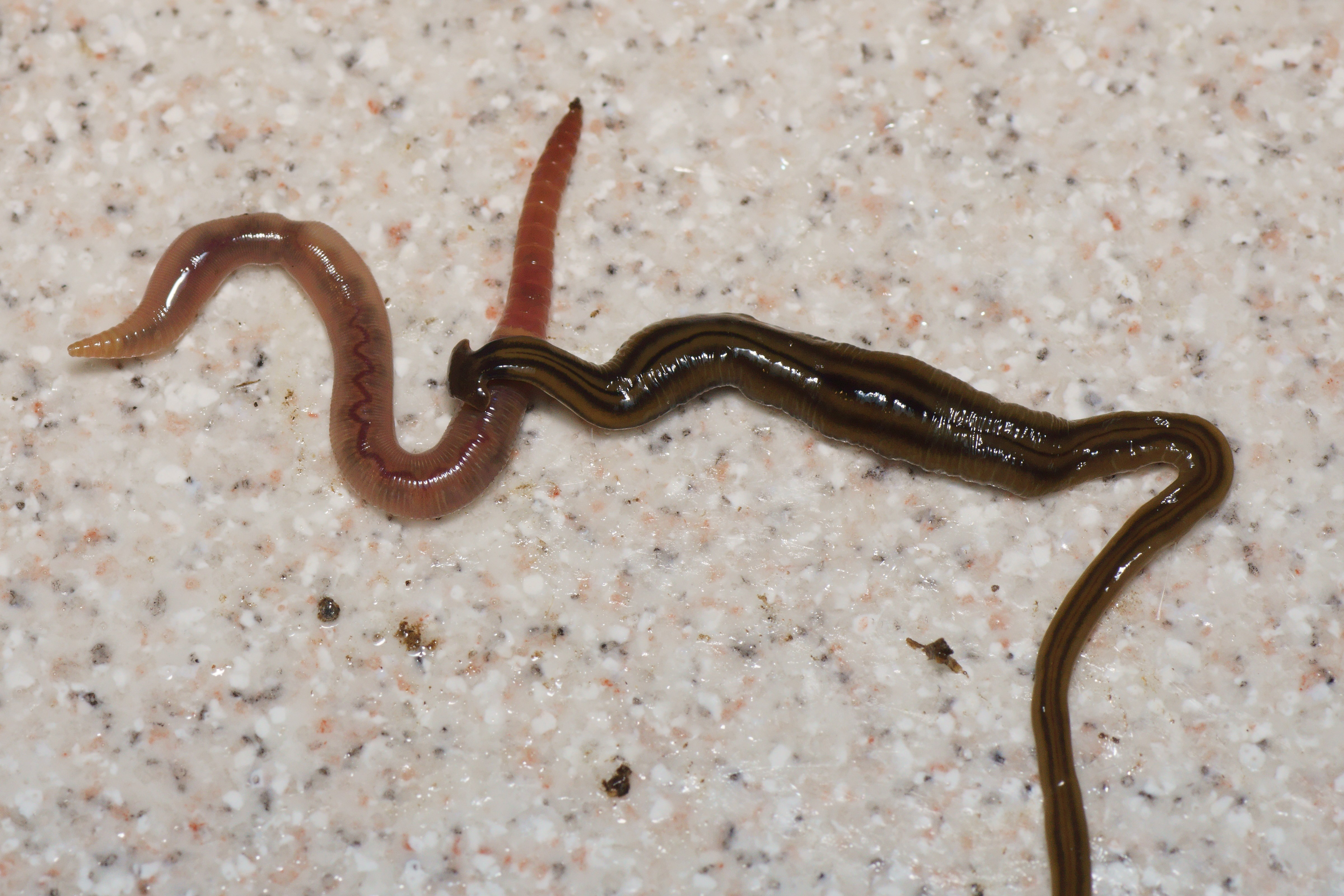
Bipalium kewense capturing an earthworm

== Feeding habits ==
B. kewense is a known predator of earthworms. It immobilizes the prey using muscular movements and possibly toxins and then everts its pharynx, connecting it to the earthworm's body and beginning digestion. The digestion seems to be at least partially extracorporeal by means of a collagenolytic enzyme.

== Toxicity ==
Bipalium kewense is one of the few terrestrial invertebrates known to produce tetrodotoxin, a neurotoxin that results in paralysis. It is possible that the toxin aids the planarian in subduing its prey as well as in protecting it against predators.

== Reproduction ==
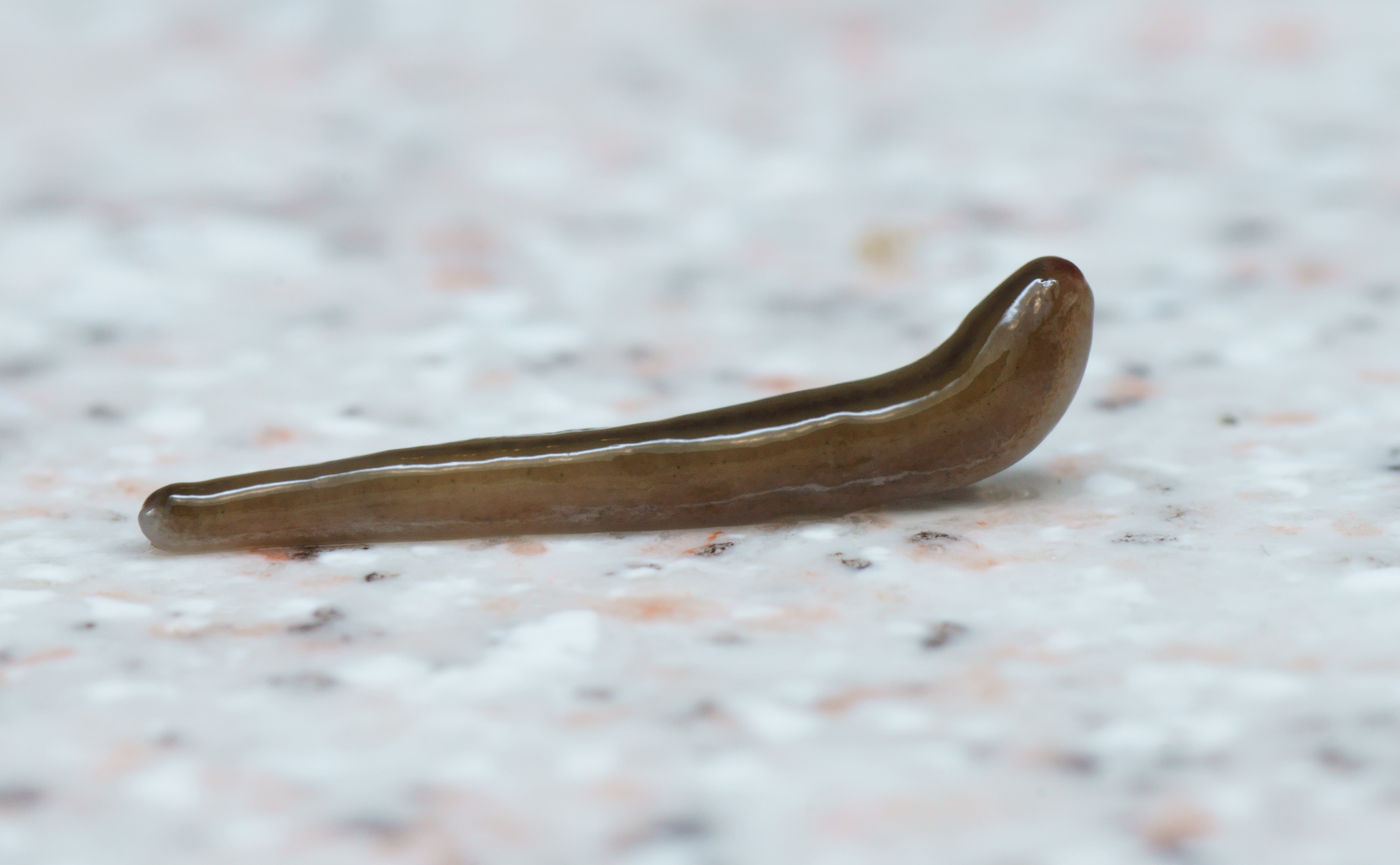
Fragment released from the posterior end of an adult worm.

All species of Bipalium are hermaphroditic, but Bipalium kewense has rarely been observed using sexual reproduction as a primary means of reproduction.

Asexual fragmentation is the primary means of reproduction in B. kewense in temperate regions. Long specimens usually release body fragments at the posterior end by transverse fission. The fragments are motile and regenerate the head plate and pharynx in a few weeks. Such a reproduction strategy is considered one reason for the successful colonization of this and other species of Bipalium.

Although there is little evidence of sexual reproduction in these planarians, there have been several reported cases of egg capsules being discovered. The egg capsules discovered had several of the same characteristics of those of B. adventitium, including coloration and incubation period. The most recent egg capsule discovered hatched offspring that did not bear a complete resemblance to adults and were considerably larger in size to that of B. adventitum offspring.

== Genetics ==
A 2018 study showed that sequences of Cytochrome c oxidase subunit I (a mitochondrial gene commonly used for barcoding) were identical for all specimens from various countries originating from several continents, suggesting that specimens were clonal. The complete mitochondrial genome, 15,666-bp in length, was obtained in 2019 from a specimen collected in France. In 2025, a complete mitogenome was obtained for another specimen, this time coming from Madagascar; only four differences were found between both sequences.
