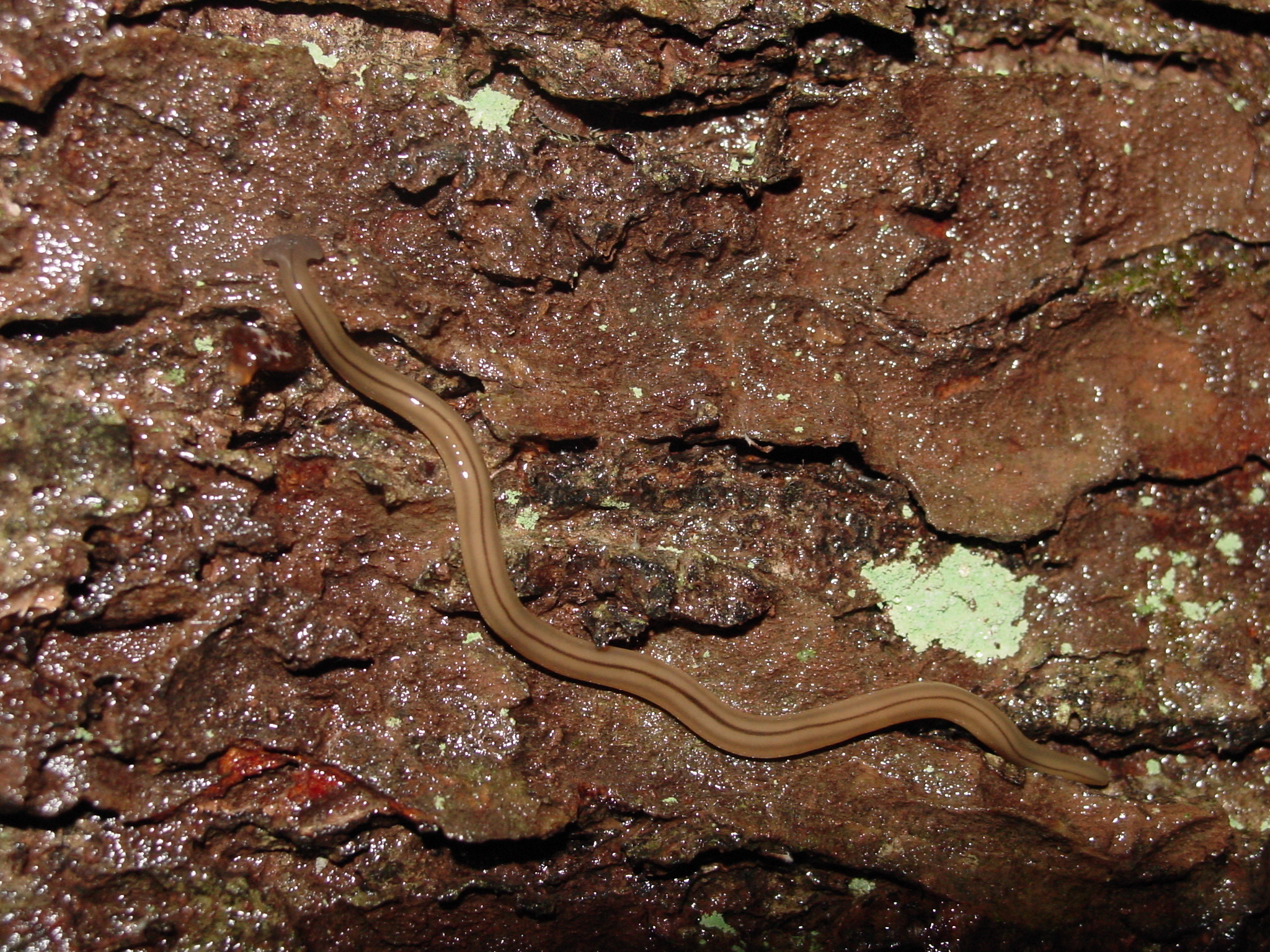

Scientific classification
- Kingdom: Animalia
- Phylum: Platyhelminthes
- Order: Tricladida
- Family: Geoplanidae
- Genus: Bipalium
- Species: B. pennsylvanicum

Binomial name
- Bipalium pennsylvanicum Ogren, 1987

= Bipalium pennsylvanicum =

Species of flatworm

Bipalium pennsylvanicum, the three-lined land planarian, is a species of land planarian in the subfamily Bipaliinae. They are native to Asia, but found mostly in Pennsylvania and the surrounding areas. They can reach a length of 5.1 inches (130 mm) or more, with a diet consisting mostly of earthworms. They reproduce sexually by creating a cocoon in the spring, but unlike related planarians, they cannot reproduce through binary fission. It is not recommended to touch these flatworms without gloves, because their mucus contains a toxin that is used for digesting prey and can cause skin irritation for some people.
