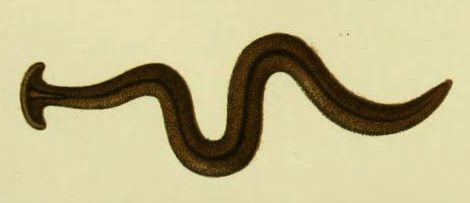
- Humbertium diana

Scientific classification
- Kingdom: Animalia
- Phylum: Platyhelminthes
- Order: Tricladida
- Family: Geoplanidae
- Subfamily: Bipaliinae
- Genus: Humbertium; Ogren & Sluys, 2001

Type species
- Perocephalus ravenalae von Graff, 1899

= Humbertium =

Genus of flatworms

Humbertium is a genus of land planarians of the subfamily Bipaliinae (hammerhead flatworms).

== Description ==
Species of Humbertium are characterized by the presence of a well developed penis papilla in the copulatory apparatus, similar to the one in Bipalium, but with the ovovitelloducts entering the female atrium anteriorly and not posteriorly as in Bipalium.

== Etymology ==
The genus Humbertium is named after the Swiss naturalist Aloïs Humbert who described several species from Sri Lanka that are now classified in the genus.

== Species ==
The genus Humbertium contains the following species:

- Humbertium core (de Beauchamp, 1930)
- Humbertium depressum (Ritter-Záhony, 1905)
- Humbertium diana (Humbert, 1862)
- Humbertium dodabettae (de Beauchamp, 1930)
- Humbertium ferruginoideum (Sabussowa, 1925)
- Humbertium interruptum (Graff, 1899)
- Humbertium ithorense Solà & Sluys, 2023
- Humbertium kelleri (von Graff, 1899)
- Humbertium longicanale (Sabussowa, 1925)
- Humbertium palnisium (de Beauchamp, 1930)
- Humbertium penangense (Kawakatsu, 1986)
- Humbertium penrissenense (de Beauchamp, 1925)
- Humbertium penzigi (Müller, 1902)
- Humbertium phebe (Humbert, 1862)
- Humbertium proserpina (Humbert, 1862)
- Humbertium ravenalae (von Graff, 1899)
- Humbertium subboreale (Sabussowa, 1925)
- Humbertium umbrinum (Geba, 1909)
- Humbertium voigti (von Graff, 1899)
- Humbertium woodworthi (von Graff, 1899)
