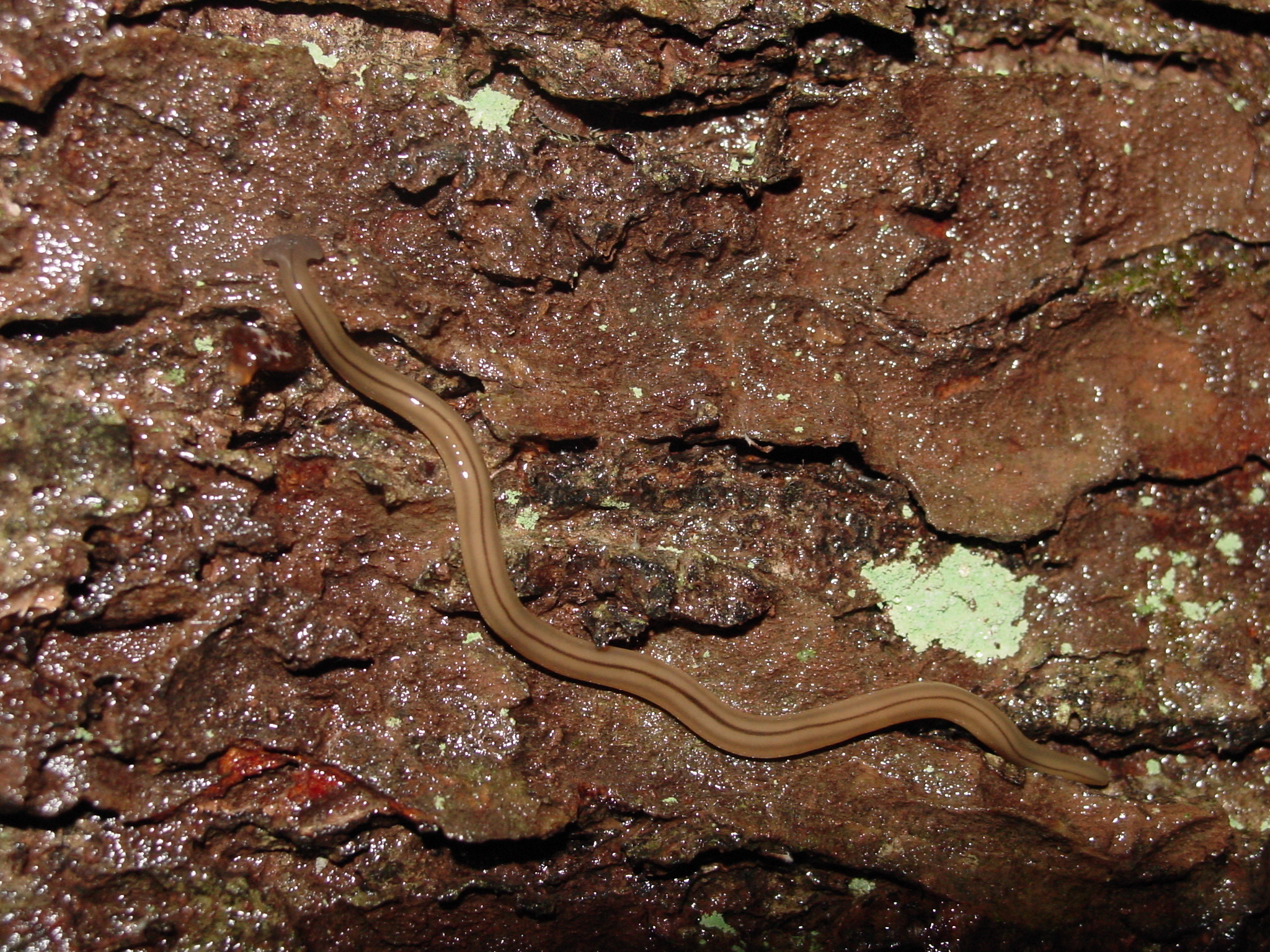
- Bipalium pennsylvanicum

Scientific classification
- Kingdom: Animalia
- Phylum: Platyhelminthes
- Order: Tricladida
- Family: Geoplanidae
- Subfamily: Bipaliinae; Stimpson, 1857

Genera
- See text

= Bipaliinae =

Subfamily of flatworms

Bipaliinae is a subfamily of land planarians found mainly in Madagascar, the Indian subcontinent and Southeast Asia, although some species have been introduced worldwide.

== Description ==
A video of Vermiviatum covidum. A scale is shown at the end and is graduated in millimetres

The subfamily Bipaliinae is characterized by having a semilunar head that gives them the common name "hammerhead worms". The head has peripheral sensory pits on the ventral side and small peripheral eyes on the dorsal side.

== Genera ==
Species in the subfamily Bipaliinae are grouped in the following genera:

- Bipalium Stimpson, 1857
- Humbertium Ogren & Sluys, 2001
- Novibipalium Kawakatsu et al., 1998
- Umbotectum Solà & Sluys, 2023
- Vermiviatum Solà & Sluys, 2023
- Diversibipalium Kawakatsu et al., 2002

== Bipaliin as invasive species ==
Several hammerhead flatworms have become invasive, the most famous being Bipalium kewense, now in many countries in all continents except the Antarctica. A 2022 study used occurrence records from online databases, including iNaturalist, and climatic and soil variable to model the potential distribution of five species of hammerhead flatworms, namely B. kewense, B. adventitium, B. pennsylvaanicum, B. vagum, and Diversibipalium multilineatum. It was found that the five species could invade Southeast Asia, New Zealand, Eastern Australia, a part of South America, eastern USA, western Europe and central Africa.
