= ANP =

ANP may refer to:

== In politics and government ==
- Afghan National Police
- Agência Nacional do Petróleo, Gás Natural e Biocombustíveis or National Agency of Petroleum, Natural Gas and Biofuels (Brazil), a regulatory agency in Brazil
- American Nazi Party, an American neo-Nazi political party
- Arakan National Party, political party in Myanmar
- Assembleia Nacional Popular, the legislature in Guinea-Bissau
- Awami National Party, a left-wing Pakistani political party

== News media ==
- Algemeen Nederlands Persbureau (Netherlands national news agency), a news agency from the Netherlands
- American News Project, an independent internet news broadcaster
- Associated Negro Press, an American news service from 1919 to 1964

== Places in the United States ==
- Acadia National Park, Maine
- Arches National Park, Utah

== Science ==
- Analytic network process, a mathematical decision making technique similar to Analytic Hierarchy Process
- Atrial natriuretic peptide, a peptide hormone
- Acyclic nucleoside phosphonate, a group of antiviral drugs
- Acidic leucine-rich nuclear phosphoprotein 32 family member A
- ANP32B
- ANP32C
- ANP32D
- ANP32E

== Other uses ==
- Adult Nurse Practitioner
- Aircraft Nuclear Propulsion
- Lee Airport, Annapolis, Maryland, US (IATA airport code and FAA location identifier "ANP")
- Angika language (ISO language code "anp")
- Absolut Null Punkt, a Japanese band featuring KK Null
- Anpao or Anp, the two-faced Lakota god of the dawn in Native American mythology
- Aviação Naval Portuguesa or Portuguese Naval Aviation
