= Selective factor 1 =

Mammalian protein found in Homo sapiens

Role of transcription factor in gene expression regulation

Selective factor 1 (also known as SL1) is a transcription factor that binds to the promoter of genes and recruits a preinitiation complex to which RNA polymerase I will bind to and begin the transcription of ribosomal RNA (rRNA).

== Discovery ==
SL1 was discovered by Robert Tjian and his colleagues in 1985 when they separated a HeLa cell extract into two functional fractions. One factor has RNA polymerase I activity, but no ability to initiate accurate transcription of a human rRNA template. This transcription factor, SL1, showed species specificity. That is, it could distinguish between the human and mouse rRNA promoter, and added increasing amount of human template at the expense of the mice template. Tijian and coworkers went on to show that by footprinting a partially purified polymerase 1 preparation could bind to the human rRNA promoter. In particular it causes a footprint over a region of the UCE called A site. This binding is not due to polymerase I itself but to a transcription factor called upstream binding factor, UBF.

== Function ==
SLI functions in assembling the transcription preinitiation complex. It is also a major determinant of species-specificity in ribosomal RNA gene transcription. Research suggests that UBF and SL1 act synergistically to stimulate transcription. Recent investigation also suggests that SL1 is a target for cancer therapy.

== Structure ==
SL1 is composed of the TATA-binding protein and at least four TAF (TATA box-binding protein-associated factor) subunits (TAF1A, TAF1B, TAF1C and TAF1D). It is therefore possible to inhibit SL1 activity with anti-TBP antibodies.

== See also ==
- RNA polymerase I
- RNA polymerase III
- Transcription preinitiation complex
