= TAF1D =

Protein-coding gene in the species Homo sapiens

Identifiers
- Aliases: TAF1D, JOSD3, RAFI41, TAF(I)41, TAFI41, TATA-box binding protein associated factor, RNA polymerase I subunit D
- External IDs: OMIM: 612823; MGI: 1922566; HomoloGene: 11472; GeneCards: TAF1D; OMA:TAF1D - orthologs

Gene location (Human)
Chr.	Chromosome 11 (human)
Band	11q21	Start	93,729,948 bp
Band	11q21	End	93,784,391 bp

Gene location (Mouse)
Chr.	Chromosome 9 (mouse)
Band	9|9 A2	Start	15,306,214 bp
Band	9|9 A2	End	15,316,991 bp
RNA expression pattern
Bgee	Human / Mouse (ortholog); Top expressed in: body of pancreas; visceral pleura; sural nerve; primary visual cortex; left ovary; parietal pleura; anterior cingulate cortex; right frontal lobe; C1 segment; pylorus / Top expressed in: Ileal epithelium; genital tubercle; embryo; tail of embryo; embryo; superior surface of tongue; morula; morula; blastocyst; ectoderm; More reference expression data
BioGPS	n/a
Gene ontology
Molecular function	DNA binding; protein binding
Cellular component	RNA polymerase transcription factor SL1 complex; nucleus; nucleoplasm; microtubule organizing center
Biological process	transcription initiation from RNA polymerase I promoter; termination of RNA polymerase I transcription; epigenetic maintenance of chromatin in transcription-competent conformation; regulation of transcription, DNA-templated; transcription, DNA-templated; transcription elongation from RNA polymerase I promoter
Sources:Amigo / QuickGO
Orthologs
Species	Human	Mouse
Entrez	79101	75316
Ensembl	ENSG00000166012	ENSMUSG00000031939
UniProt	Q9H5J8	Q9D4V4
RefSeq (mRNA)	NM_024116	NM_026541; NM_027261; NM_029248
RefSeq (protein)	NP_077021	NP_081537; NP_083524
Location (UCSC)	Chr 11: 93.73 – 93.78 Mb	Chr 9: 15.31 – 15.32 Mb
PubMed search
- Wikidata
View/Edit Human	View/Edit Mouse

TATA box binding protein (TBP)-associated factor, RNA polymerase I, D, 41kDa is a protein that in humans is encoded by the TAF1D gene.

== Function ==
TAF1D is a member of the SL1 complex, which includes TBP and TAF1A, TAF1B, and TAF1C, and plays a role in RNA polymerase I transcription.
