= BRF2 =

BRF2 may refer to:

- BRF2 (gene)
- BRF2 radio channel of Belgischer Rundfunk
