= MAF1 =

Protein-coding gene in the species Homo sapiens

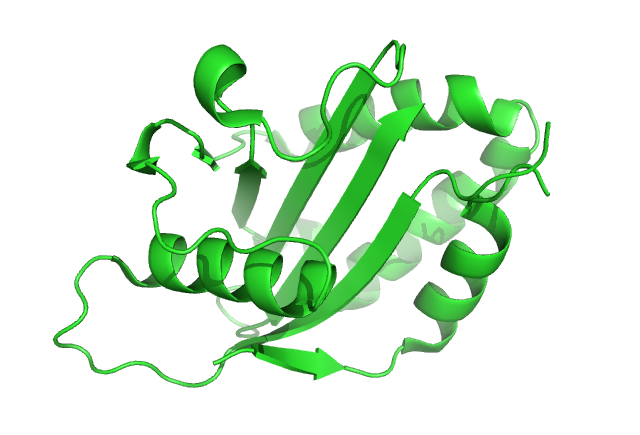
Available structures
| PDB | Ortholog search: PDBe RCSB |
| PDB | List of PDB id codes 3NR5 |

Identifiers
- Aliases: MAF1, MAF1 homolog, negative regulator of RNA polymerase III
- External IDs: OMIM: 610210; MGI: 1916127; HomoloGene: 49867; GeneCards: MAF1; OMA:MAF1 - orthologs

Gene location (Human)
| Chr. | Chromosome 8 (human) |
| Band | 8q24.3 | Start | 144,104,461 bp |
| Band | 8q24.3 | End | 144,107,611 bp |

Gene location (Mouse)
| Chr. | Chromosome 15 (mouse) |
| Band | 15|15 D3 | Start | 76,235,494 bp |
| Band | 15|15 D3 | End | 76,238,580 bp |
RNA expression pattern
| Bgee | Human / Mouse (ortholog); Top expressed in: muscle of thigh; gastrocnemius muscle; apex of heart; muscle layer of sigmoid colon; popliteal artery; tibial arteries; right coronary artery; gastric mucosa; left ventricle; left coronary artery / Top expressed in: medial ganglionic eminence; Rostral migratory stream; neural layer of retina; dentate gyrus of hippocampal formation granule cell; muscle of thigh; right kidney; thymus; granulocyte; ventricular zone; blood; More reference expression data |
| BioGPS | n/a |
Gene ontology
| Molecular function | RNA polymerase III core binding; GABA receptor binding; protein binding |
| Cellular component | cytoplasm; intracellular membrane-bounded organelle; plasma membrane; inhibitory synapse; intracellular anatomical structure; axon; dendrite; nucleolus; perinuclear region of cytoplasm; nucleus; nucleoplasm; cytosol; centrosome |
| Biological process | regulation of transcription, DNA-templated; transcription, DNA-templated; negative regulation of transcription by RNA polymerase III |
Sources:Amigo / QuickGO
Orthologs
| Species | Human | Mouse |
| Entrez | 84232 | 68877 |
| Ensembl | ENSG00000179632 | ENSMUSG00000022553 |
| UniProt | Q9H063 | Q9D0U6 |
| RefSeq (mRNA) | NM_032272 | NM_001164607; NM_001164608; NM_026859 |
| RefSeq (protein) | NP_115648 | NP_001158079; NP_001158080; NP_081135 |
| Location (UCSC) | Chr 8: 144.1 – 144.11 Mb | Chr 15: 76.24 – 76.24 Mb |
| PubMed search |
- Wikidata
| View/Edit Human | View/Edit Mouse |

Repressor of RNA polymerase III transcription MAF1 homolog is a protein that in humans is encoded by the MAF1 gene.

This gene encodes a protein that is homologous to Maf1, a Saccharomyces cerevisiae protein which is highly conserved in eukaryotic cells. S. cerevisiae Maf1 is a negative effector of RNA polymerase III (Pol III). It responds to changes in the cellular environment and represses Pol III transcription. Biochemical studies identified the initiation factor TFIIIB as a target for Maf1-dependent repression.
