= BDP1 =

Protein-coding gene in the species Homo sapiens

Identifiers
- Aliases: BDP1, HSA238520, TAF3B1, TFC5, TFIIIB150, TFIIIB90, TFNR, B double prime 1, subunit of RNA polymerase III transcription initiation factor IIIB, DFNB112, TFIIIB''
- External IDs: OMIM: 607012; MGI: 1347077; GeneCards: BDP1

Gene location (Human)
Chr.	Chromosome 5 (human)
Band	5q13.2	Start	71,455,651 bp
Band	5q13.2	End	71,567,820 bp

Gene location (Mouse)
Chr.	Chromosome 13 (mouse)
Band	13 D1|13 52.92 cM	Start	100,017,994 bp
Band	13 D1|13 52.92 cM	End	100,104,070 bp
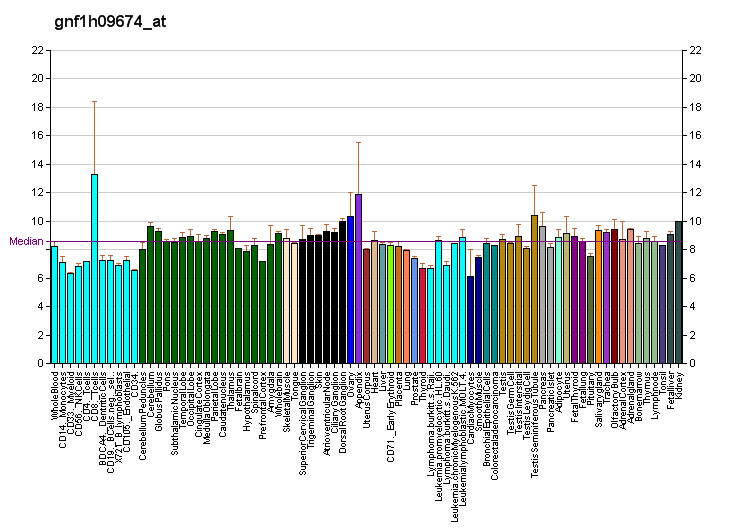
RNA expression pattern
Bgee	Human / Mouse (ortholog); Top expressed in: sural nerve; Achilles tendon; epithelium of colon; corpus callosum; right uterine tube; testicle; tonsil; bone marrow cell; ventricular zone; endometrium / Top expressed in: superior cervical ganglion; hand; otolith organ; utricle; cumulus cell; tail of embryo; primitive streak; medullary collecting duct; condyle; fossa; More reference expression data
BioGPS	More reference expression data
Gene ontology
Molecular function	DNA binding; TFIIIC-class transcription factor complex binding; RNA polymerase III general transcription initiation factor activity
Cellular component	nucleus; transcription factor TFIIIB complex; nucleoplasm
Biological process	regulation of transcription by RNA polymerase III; regulation of transcription, DNA-templated; transcription, DNA-templated; RNA polymerase III preinitiation complex assembly; transcription by RNA polymerase III
Sources:Amigo / QuickGO
Orthologs
Databases	NCBI: entry; OMA: entry
Species	Human	Mouse
Entrez	55814	544971
Ensembl	ENSG00000274803; ENSG00000273873; ENSG00000145734	ENSMUSG00000049658
UniProt	A6H8Y1; H7C5U4	Q571C7
RefSeq (mRNA)	NM_018429	NM_001081061
RefSeq (protein)	NP_060899	NP_001074530
Location (UCSC)	Chr 5: 71.46 – 71.57 Mb	Chr 13: 100.02 – 100.1 Mb
PubMed search
- Wikidata
View/Edit Human	View/Edit Mouse

Transcription factor TFIIIB component B″ homolog also known as TFIIIB150 is a protein that in humans is encoded by the BDP1 gene.

== Function ==
TFIIIB150 is a subunit of the TFIIIB transcription initiation complex, which recruits RNA polymerase III to target promoters in order to initiate transcription. The encoded protein localizes to concentrated aggregates in the nucleus, and is required for transcription from all three types of polymerase III promoters. It is phosphorylated by casein kinase 2 during mitosis, resulting in its release from chromatin and suppression of polymerase III transcription.
