= Protein SET =

Protein-coding gene in the species Homo sapiens

SET
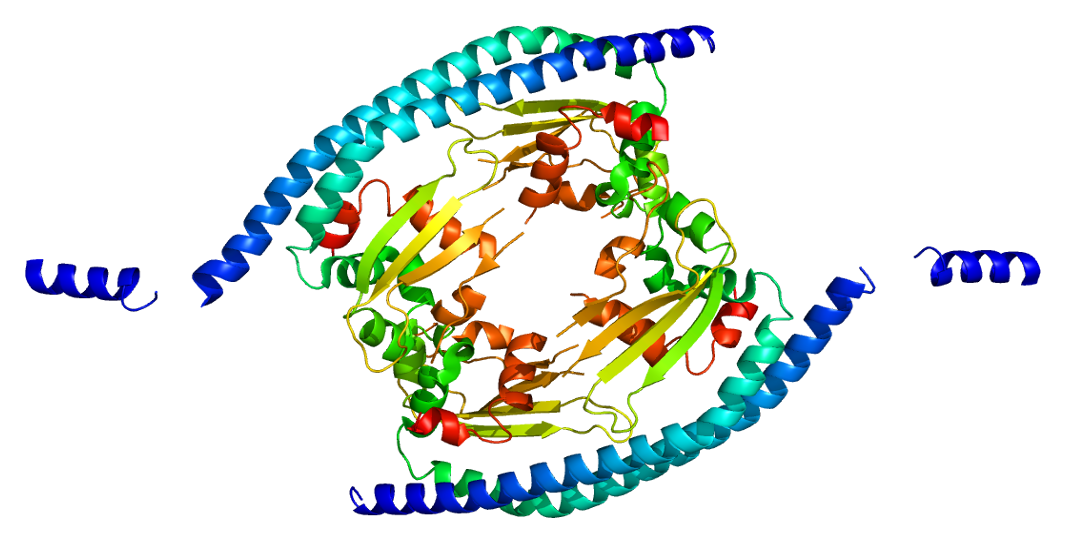

Identifiers
- Aliases: SET, 2PP2A, I2PP2A, IGAAD, IPP2A2, PHAPII, TAF-I, TAF-IBETA, SET nuclear proto-oncogene, MRD58
- External IDs: OMIM: 600960; MGI: 1860267; GeneCards: SET
Available structures
PDB	Ortholog search: PDBe RCSB
PDB	List of PDB id codes 2E50

Gene location (Human)
Chr.	Chromosome 9 (human)
Band	9q34.11	Start	128,683,424 bp
Band	9q34.11	End	128,696,400 bp

Gene location (Mouse)
Chr.	Chromosome 2 (mouse)
Band	2|2 B	Start	29,947,390 bp
Band	2|2 B	End	29,962,589 bp
RNA expression pattern
Bgee	Human / Mouse (ortholog); Top expressed in: ganglionic eminence; Achilles tendon; ventricular zone; epithelium of nasopharynx; epithelium of colon; germinal epithelium; palpebral conjunctiva; lymph node; optic nerve; parietal pleura / Top expressed in: tail of embryo; epiblast; abdominal wall; migratory enteric neural crest cell; morula; ventricular zone; embryo; vas deferens; primitive streak; somite; More reference expression data
BioGPS	n/a
Gene ontology
Molecular function	DNA binding; histone binding; protein binding; protein phosphatase inhibitor activity; protein phosphatase regulator activity
Cellular component	cytoplasm; cytosol; nucleoplasm; endoplasmic reticulum; perinuclear region of cytoplasm; nucleus; lipid droplet; protein-containing complex
Biological process	negative regulation of neuron apoptotic process; nucleosome assembly; regulation of mRNA stability; DNA replication; nucleosome disassembly; nucleocytoplasmic transport; viral process; negative regulation of transcription, DNA-templated; negative regulation of histone acetylation; negative regulation of catalytic activity; regulation of catalytic activity; negative regulation of phosphoprotein phosphatase activity; regulation of phosphoprotein phosphatase activity
Sources:Amigo / QuickGO
Orthologs
Databases	NCBI: entry; OMA: entry
Species	Human	Mouse
Entrez	6418	56086
Ensembl	ENSG00000119335	ENSMUSG00000054766
UniProt	Q01105	Q9EQU5
RefSeq (mRNA)	NM_001122821; NM_001248000; NM_001248001; NM_003011; NM_001374326	NM_001204875; NM_023871
RefSeq (protein)	NP_001116293; NP_001234929; NP_001234930; NP_003002; NP_001361255	NP_001191804; NP_076360
Location (UCSC)	Chr 9: 128.68 – 128.7 Mb	Chr 2: 29.95 – 29.96 Mb
PubMed search
- Wikidata
View/Edit Human	View/Edit Mouse

Protein SET, also known as Protein SET 1, is a protein that in humans is encoded by the SET gene.

== Interactions ==
Protein SET has been shown to interact with:

- Acidic leucine-rich nuclear phosphoprotein 32 family member A,
- CDK5R1,
- KLF5,
- NME1, and
- TAF1A.
