= RRN3 =

Protein-coding gene in the species Homo sapiens

Identifiers
- Aliases: RRN3, A-270G1.2, TIFIA, RRN3 homolog, RNA polymerase I transcription factor
- External IDs: OMIM: 605121; MGI: 1925255; GeneCards: RRN3

Gene location (Human)
Chr.	Chromosome 16 (human)
Band	16p13.11	Start	15,060,033 bp
Band	16p13.11	End	15,094,311 bp

Gene location (Mouse)
Chr.	Chromosome 16 (mouse)
Band	16|16 A1	Start	13,598,572 bp
Band	16|16 A1	End	13,632,703 bp
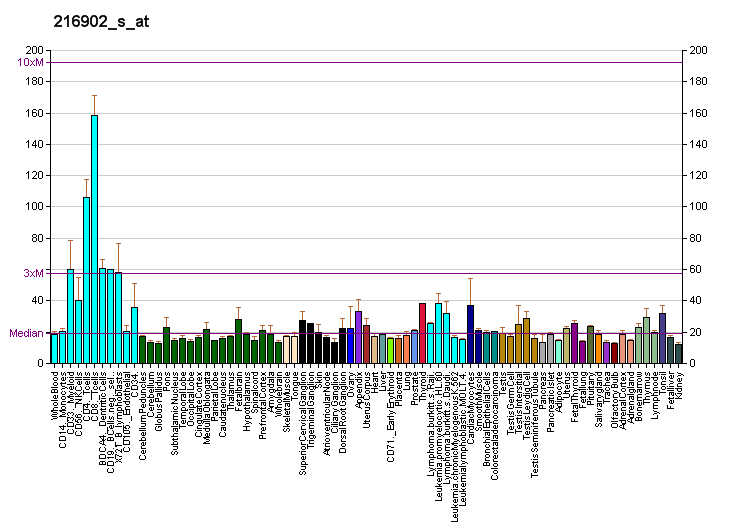

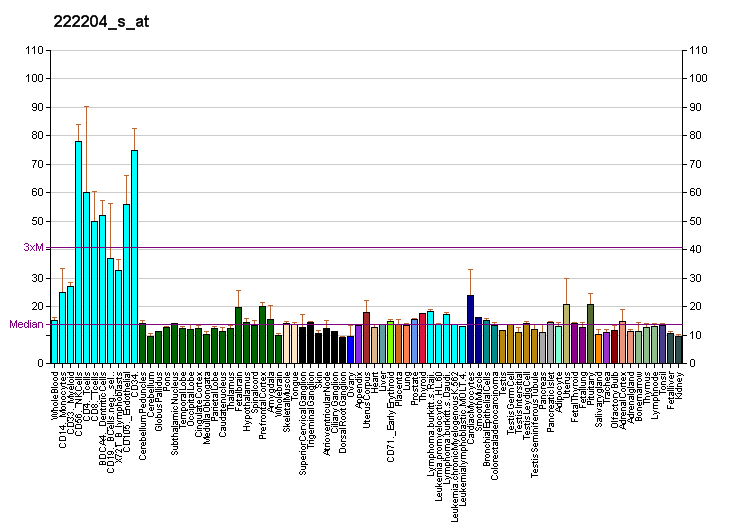

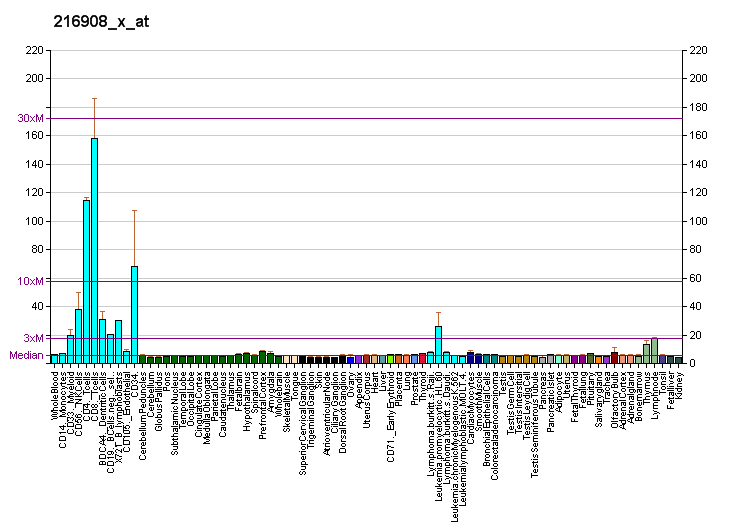
RNA expression pattern
Bgee	Human / Mouse (ortholog); Top expressed in: Achilles tendon; ganglionic eminence; gastrocnemius muscle; ventricular zone; endometrium; islet of Langerhans; rectum; subcutaneous adipose tissue; ovary; muscle of thigh / Top expressed in: cumulus cell; neural tube; cardiac muscle tissue of left ventricle; epiblast; spermatocyte; morula; morula; ventricular zone; muscle of thigh; ganglionic eminence; More reference expression data
BioGPS	More reference expression data
Gene ontology
Molecular function	RNA polymerase binding; RNA polymerase I core promoter sequence-specific DNA binding; RNA polymerase I core binding; RNA polymerase I general transcription initiation factor activity
Cellular component	nucleolus; nucleoplasm; nucleus
Biological process	in utero embryonic development; nucleolus organization; positive regulation of neuron projection development; regulation of transcription, DNA-templated; cell population proliferation; negative regulation of intrinsic apoptotic signaling pathway by p53 class mediator; DNA-templated transcription, initiation; regulation of DNA-templated transcription, initiation; positive regulation of transcription, DNA-templated; cytoplasm organization; transcription, DNA-templated; homeostasis of number of cells; transcription initiation from RNA polymerase I promoter; ribosome biogenesis; regulation of transcription by RNA polymerase I; RNA polymerase I preinitiation complex assembly
Sources:Amigo / QuickGO
Orthologs
Databases	NCBI: entry; OMA: entry
Species	Human	Mouse
Entrez	54700	106298
Ensembl	ENSG00000085721; ENSG00000278494	ENSMUSG00000022682
UniProt	Q9NYV6	B2RS91
RefSeq (mRNA)	NM_001301064; NM_018427	NM_001039521
RefSeq (protein)	NP_001287993; NP_060897	NP_001034610
Location (UCSC)	Chr 16: 15.06 – 15.09 Mb	Chr 16: 13.6 – 13.63 Mb
PubMed search
- Wikidata
View/Edit Human	View/Edit Mouse

RNA polymerase I-specific transcription initiation factor RRN3 is an enzyme that in humans is encoded by the RRN3 gene.

== Interactions ==
RRN3 has been shown to interact with TAF1B.
