= ANP32CP =

Protein-coding gene in the species Homo sapiens

Identifiers
- Aliases: ANP32C, PP32R1, acidic nuclear phosphoprotein 32 family member C
- External IDs: OMIM: 606877; GeneCards: ANP32C

Gene location (Human)
Chr.	Chromosome 4 (human)
Band	4q32.3	Start	164,197,007 bp
Band	4q32.3	End	164,197,711 bp
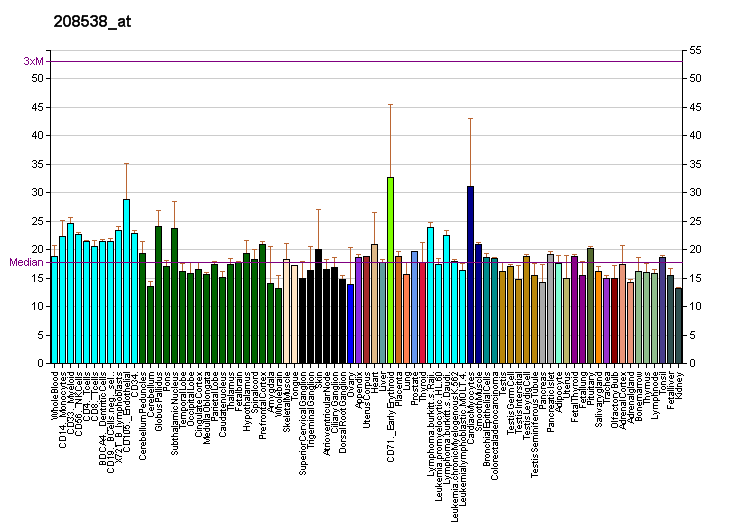
RNA expression pattern
Bgee	Human / Mouse (ortholog); Top expressed in: sural nerve; corpus callosum; prefrontal cortex; heart; brain; nucleus accumbens; putamen; blood; hypothalamus / n/a; More reference expression data
BioGPS	More reference expression data
Gene ontology
Molecular function	histone binding
Cellular component	nucleus; perinuclear region of cytoplasm
Biological process	nucleosome assembly; nucleocytoplasmic transport; regulation of apoptotic process; histone exchange
Sources:Amigo / QuickGO
Orthologs
Databases	NCBI: entry
Species	Human	Mouse
Entrez	23520	n/a
Ensembl	n/a	n/a
UniProt	O43423	n/a
RefSeq (mRNA)	NM_012403; NM_001388483	n/a
RefSeq (protein)	NP_036535	n/a
Location (UCSC)	Chr 4: 164.2 – 164.2 Mb	n/a
PubMed search		n/a
- Wikidata
View/Edit Human

Acidic leucine-rich nuclear phosphoprotein 32 family member C is a protein that in humans is encoded by the ANP32CP gene.

== Function ==
Phosphoprotein 32 (PP32) is a tumor suppressor that can inhibit several types of cancers, including prostate and breast cancers. The protein encoded by this gene is one of at least two proteins that are similar in amino acid sequence to PP32 and are part of the same acidic nuclear phosphoprotein gene family. However, unlike PP32, the encoded protein is tumorigenic. The tumor suppressor function of PP32 has been localized to a 25 amino acid region that is divergent between PP32 and the protein encoded by this gene. This gene does not contain introns.

== See also ==
- ANP32A, ANP32B, ANP32D, ANP32E
