= ANP32B =

Protein-coding gene in the species Homo sapiens

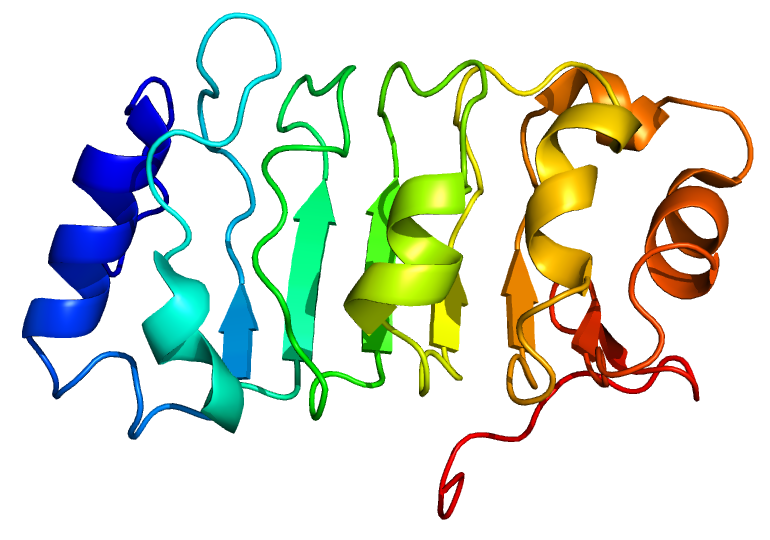

Identifiers
- Aliases: ANP32B, APRIL, PHAPI2, SSP29, acidic nuclear phosphoprotein 32 family member B
- External IDs: MGI: 1914878; GeneCards: ANP32B
Available structures
PDB	Ortholog search: PDBe RCSB
PDB	List of PDB id codes 2ELL, 2RR6

Gene location (Human)
Chr.	Chromosome 9 (human)
Band	9q22.33	Start	97,983,341 bp
Band	9q22.33	End	98,015,943 bp

Gene location (Mouse)
Chr.	Chromosome 4 (mouse)
Band	4|4 B1	Start	46,450,902 bp
Band	4|4 B1	End	46,472,657 bp
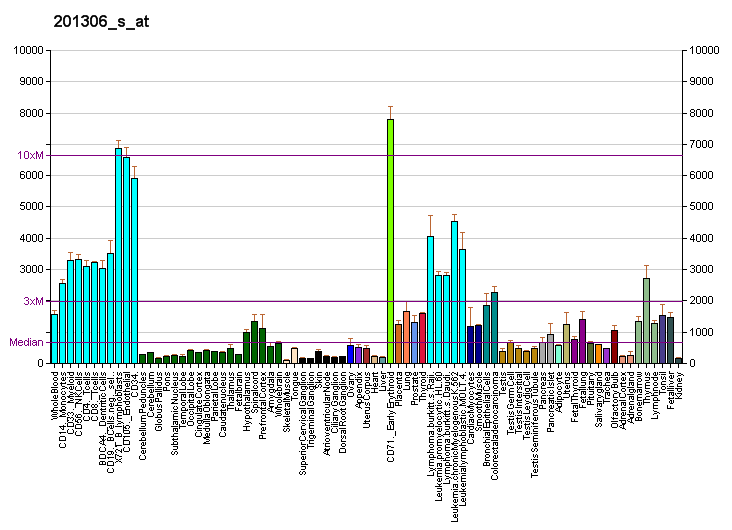

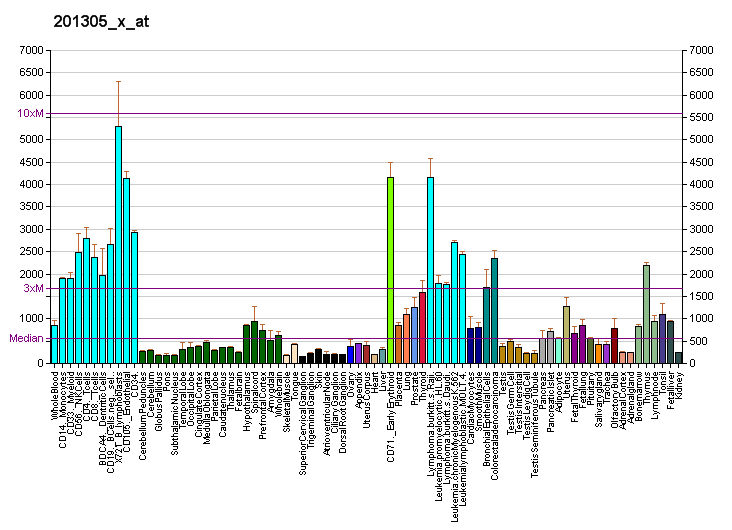
RNA expression pattern
Bgee	Human / Mouse (ortholog); Top expressed in: tendon of biceps brachii; trabecular bone; optic nerve; thymus; internal globus pallidus; corpus epididymis; cartilage tissue; dorsal motor nucleus of vagus nerve; parotid gland; caput epididymis / Top expressed in: tail of embryo; genital tubercle; zygote; primary oocyte; secondary oocyte; bone marrow; epiblast; yolk sac; ventricular zone; thymus; More reference expression data
BioGPS	More reference expression data
Gene ontology
Molecular function	histone binding; protein binding; RNA polymerase binding
Cellular component	cytoplasm; extracellular exosome; nucleolus; nucleus
Biological process	positive regulation of protein export from nucleus; negative regulation of cell differentiation; inner ear development; nucleosome assembly; roof of mouth development; vasculature development; activation of cysteine-type endopeptidase activity involved in apoptotic process; ventricular system development; histone exchange
Sources:Amigo / QuickGO
Orthologs
Databases	NCBI: entry; OMA: entry
Species	Human	Mouse
Entrez	10541	67628
Ensembl	ENSG00000136938	ENSMUSG00000028333
UniProt	Q92688	Q9EST5
RefSeq (mRNA)	NM_006401	NM_130889
RefSeq (protein)	NP_006392	NP_570959
Location (UCSC)	Chr 9: 97.98 – 98.02 Mb	Chr 4: 46.45 – 46.47 Mb
PubMed search
- Wikidata
View/Edit Human	View/Edit Mouse

Acidic leucine-rich nuclear phosphoprotein 32 family member B (ANP32B) also known as "acidic protein rich in leucines" (APRIL) is a protein that in humans is encoded by the ANP32B gene.

APRIL is also the acronym used for an entirely different protein, TNFSF13, a member of the tumor necrosis factor superfamily whose alternative name, A PRoliferation Inducing Ligand, shares the same acronym as that for ANP32B

== See also ==
- ANP32A, ANP32C, ANP32D, ANP32E
