= SNAPC2 =

Protein-coding gene in the species Homo sapiens

Identifiers
- Aliases: SNAPC2, PTFDELTA, SNAP45, small nuclear RNA activating complex polypeptide 2
- External IDs: OMIM: 605076; MGI: 1914861; HomoloGene: 2318; GeneCards: SNAPC2; OMA:SNAPC2 - orthologs

Gene location (Mouse)
Chr.	Chromosome 8 (mouse)
Band	8|8 A1.1	Start	4,303,080 bp
Band	8|8 A1.1	End	4,306,220 bp
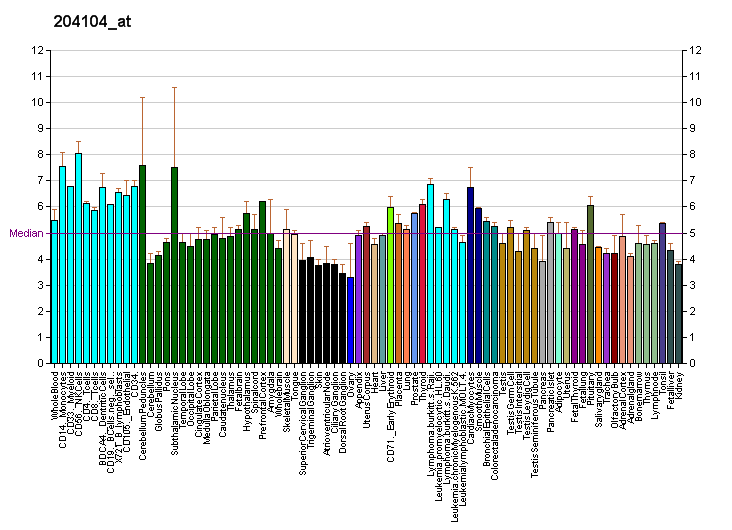
RNA expression pattern
Bgee	Human / Mouse (ortholog); Top expressed in: right uterine tube; left uterine tube; popliteal artery; gastric mucosa; canal of the cervix; ascending aorta; right coronary artery; left coronary artery; anterior pituitary; nucleus accumbens / Top expressed in: internal carotid artery; external carotid artery; ankle; right ventricle; vas deferens; epithelium of lens; medial ganglionic eminence; fossa; condyle; efferent ductule; More reference expression data
BioGPS	More reference expression data
Gene ontology
Molecular function	DNA-binding transcription factor activity
Cellular component	nucleus; nucleoplasm; cytosol; nuclear body
Biological process	snRNA transcription; regulation of transcription, DNA-templated; transcription by RNA polymerase II; transcription, DNA-templated; transcription by RNA polymerase III; snRNA transcription by RNA polymerase II
Sources:Amigo / QuickGO
Orthologs
Species	Human	Mouse
Entrez	6618	102209
Ensembl	n/a	ENSMUSG00000011837
UniProt	Q13487	Q91XA5
RefSeq (mRNA)	NM_003083	NM_133968
RefSeq (protein)	NP_003074	NP_598729
Location (UCSC)	n/a	Chr 8: 4.3 – 4.31 Mb
PubMed search
- Wikidata
View/Edit Human	View/Edit Mouse

snRNA-activating protein complex subunit 2 is a protein that in humans is encoded by the SNAPC2 gene.

== Interactions ==
SNAPC2 has been shown to interact with SNAPC4.
