= Upstream activating factor =

Upstream activation factor (full name: Upstream activation factor subunit UAF30) also called "Upstream activation factor 30 KDa subunit", is a protein found in baker's yeast, strain ATCC 204508/S288c. It is found on the gene UAF30.
