= SNAPC1 =

Protein-coding gene in the species Homo sapiens

Identifiers
- Aliases: SNAPC1, PTFgamma, SNAP43, small nuclear RNA activating complex polypeptide 1
- External IDs: OMIM: 600591; MGI: 1922877; HomoloGene: 2317; GeneCards: SNAPC1; OMA:SNAPC1 - orthologs

Gene location (Human)
Chr.	Chromosome 14 (human)
Band	14q23.2	Start	61,762,420 bp
Band	14q23.2	End	61,796,428 bp

Gene location (Mouse)
Chr.	Chromosome 12 (mouse)
Band	12|12 C3	Start	74,011,255 bp
Band	12|12 C3	End	74,035,740 bp
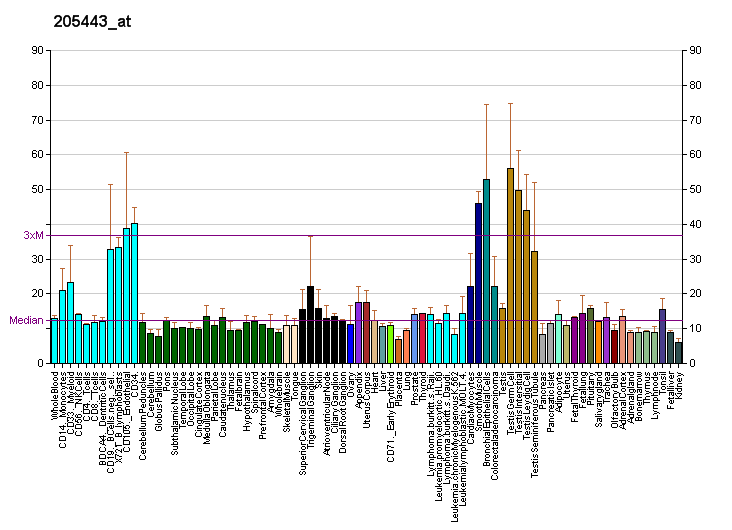
RNA expression pattern
Bgee	Human / Mouse (ortholog); Top expressed in: testicle; cartilage tissue; oocyte; secondary oocyte; sperm; bronchial epithelial cell; Achilles tendon; tail of epididymis; caput epididymis; mucosa of paranasal sinus / Top expressed in: otolith organ; utricle; supraoptic nucleus; zygote; secondary oocyte; pituitary gland; hand; neural layer of retina; paraventricular nucleus of hypothalamus; cumulus cell; More reference expression data
BioGPS	More reference expression data
Gene ontology
Molecular function	DNA binding; sequence-specific DNA binding
Cellular component	snRNA-activating protein complex; nucleus; nucleoplasm; nucleolus
Biological process	regulation of transcription, DNA-templated; transcription, DNA-templated; snRNA transcription by RNA polymerase III; snRNA transcription by RNA polymerase II
Sources:Amigo / QuickGO
Orthologs
Species	Human	Mouse
Entrez	6617	75627
Ensembl	ENSG00000023608	ENSMUSG00000021113
UniProt	Q16533	Q8K0S9
RefSeq (mRNA)	NM_003082	NM_178392
RefSeq (protein)	NP_003073	NP_848479
Location (UCSC)	Chr 14: 61.76 – 61.8 Mb	Chr 12: 74.01 – 74.04 Mb
PubMed search
- Wikidata
View/Edit Human	View/Edit Mouse

snRNA-activating protein complex subunit 1 is a protein that in humans is encoded by the SNAPC1 gene.

== Interactions ==
SNAPC1 has been shown to interact with SNAPC4, SNAPC3 and Retinoblastoma protein.
