= TAF1A =

Protein-coding gene in humans

Identifiers
- Aliases: TAF1A, MGC:17061, RAFI48, SL1, TAFI48, TATA-box binding protein associated factor, RNA polymerase I subunit A
- External IDs: OMIM: 604903; MGI: 109578; GeneCards: TAF1A

Gene location (Human)
Chr.	Chromosome 1 (human)
Band	1q41	Start	222,557,902 bp
Band	1q41	End	222,589,933 bp

Gene location (Mouse)
Chr.	Chromosome 1 (mouse)
Band	1|1 H5	Start	183,170,325 bp
Band	1|1 H5	End	183,191,020 bp
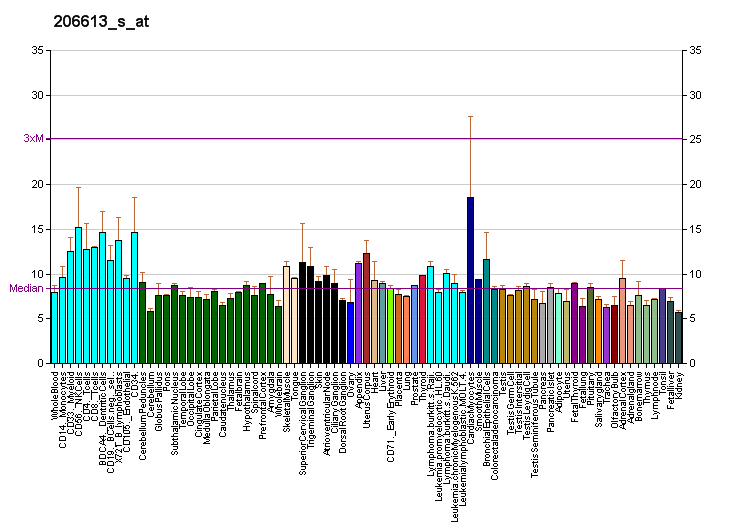
RNA expression pattern
Bgee	Human / Mouse (ortholog); Top expressed in: oocyte; secondary oocyte; testicle; ventricular zone; gonad; ganglionic eminence; Achilles tendon; monocyte; lymph node; stromal cell of endometrium / Top expressed in: primary oocyte; zygote; secondary oocyte; neural layer of retina; Ileal epithelium; spermatocyte; ventricular zone; Paneth cell; medullary collecting duct; morula; More reference expression data
BioGPS	More reference expression data
Gene ontology
Molecular function	DNA binding; protein binding
Cellular component	microtubule cytoskeleton; RNA polymerase I transcription regulator complex; nucleus; nucleoplasm
Biological process	transcription initiation from RNA polymerase I promoter; transcription by RNA polymerase I; termination of RNA polymerase I transcription; epigenetic maintenance of chromatin in transcription-competent conformation; transcription by RNA polymerase II; regulation of transcription, DNA-templated; transcription, DNA-templated; transcription elongation from RNA polymerase I promoter
Sources:Amigo / QuickGO
Orthologs
Databases	NCBI: entry; OMA: entry
Species	Human	Mouse
Entrez	9015	21339
Ensembl	ENSG00000143498	ENSMUSG00000072258
UniProt	Q15573; Q5JRA7	P97357
RefSeq (mRNA)	NM_001201536; NM_005681; NM_139352	NM_001277957; NM_001277958; NM_001277959; NM_021466
RefSeq (protein)	NP_001188465; NP_005672; NP_647603	NP_001264886; NP_001264887; NP_001264888; NP_067441
Location (UCSC)	Chr 1: 222.56 – 222.59 Mb	Chr 1: 183.17 – 183.19 Mb
PubMed search
- Wikidata
View/Edit Human	View/Edit Mouse

TATA box-binding protein-associated factor RNA polymerase I subunit A is an enzyme that in humans is encoded by the TAF1A gene.

== Function ==
Initiation of transcription by RNA polymerase I requires the formation of a complex composed of the TATA-binding protein (TBP) and three TBP-associated factors (TAFs) specific for RNA polymerase I. This complex, known as selective factor 1 (SL1), binds to the core promoter of ribosomal RNA genes to position the polymerase properly and acts as a channel for regulatory signals. This gene encodes the smallest SL1-specific TAF. Two transcripts encoding different isoforms have been identified.

== Interactions ==
TAF1A has been shown to interact with Acidic leucine-rich nuclear phosphoprotein 32 family member A and Protein SET.
