= SNAPC3 =

Protein-coding gene in the species Homo sapiens

Identifiers
- Aliases: SNAPC3, PTFbeta, SNAP50, small nuclear RNA activating complex polypeptide 3
- External IDs: OMIM: 602348; MGI: 1916338; HomoloGene: 31130; GeneCards: SNAPC3; OMA:SNAPC3 - orthologs

Gene location (Human)
Chr.	Chromosome 9 (human)
Band	9p22.3	Start	15,422,704 bp
Band	9p22.3	End	15,465,953 bp

Gene location (Mouse)
Chr.	Chromosome 4 (mouse)
Band	4|4 C3	Start	83,417,724 bp
Band	4|4 C3	End	83,467,676 bp
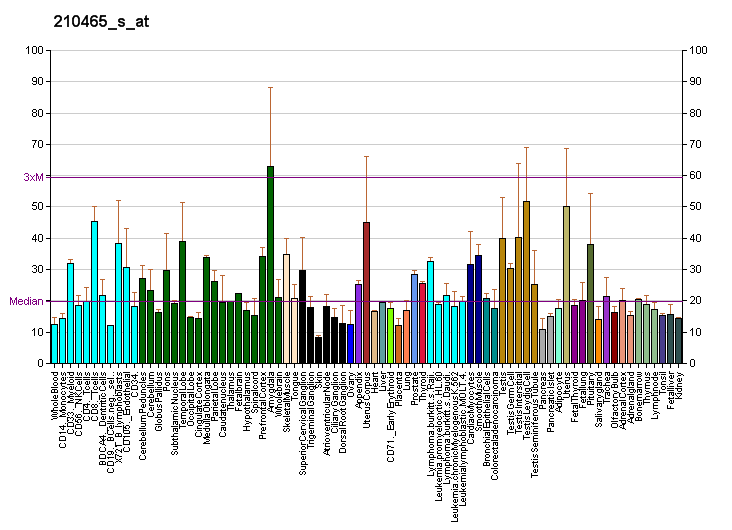

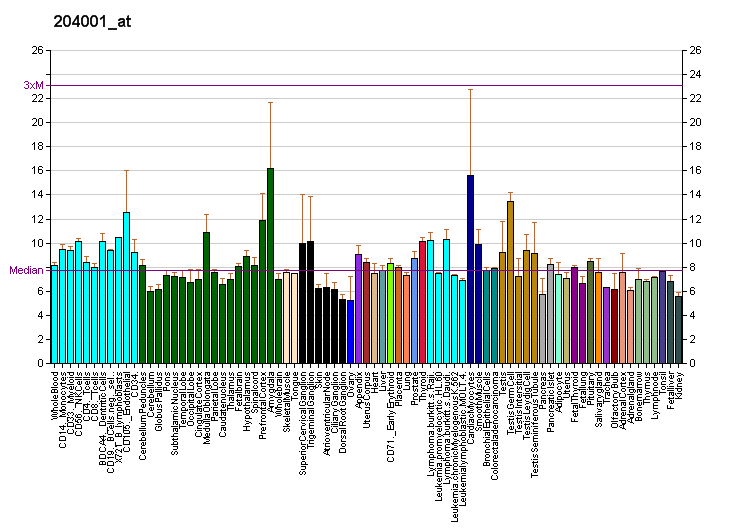

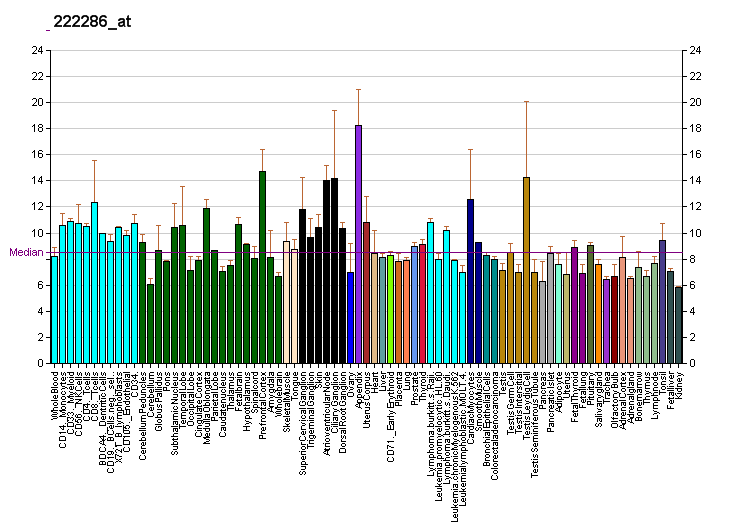
RNA expression pattern
Bgee	Human / Mouse (ortholog); Top expressed in: ganglionic eminence; ventricular zone; Skeletal muscle tissue of biceps brachii; left testis; right testis; right ventricle; Achilles tendon; sural nerve; gonad; pons / Top expressed in: Rostral migratory stream; medial ganglionic eminence; genital tubercle; tail of embryo; neural layer of retina; superior cervical ganglion; ascending aorta; lens; aortic valve; spermatocyte; More reference expression data
BioGPS	More reference expression data
Gene ontology
Molecular function	protein binding; DNA binding
Cellular component	nucleus; nucleoplasm; nucleolus; nuclear body
Biological process	snRNA transcription; regulation of transcription, DNA-templated; transcription by RNA polymerase II; transcription, DNA-templated; transcription by RNA polymerase III; snRNA transcription by RNA polymerase II
Sources:Amigo / QuickGO
Orthologs
Species	Human	Mouse
Entrez	6619	77634
Ensembl	ENSG00000164975	ENSMUSG00000028483
UniProt	Q92966	Q9D2C9
RefSeq (mRNA)	NM_001039697; NM_003084	NM_029949; NM_001358795
RefSeq (protein)	NP_001034786; NP_001356576; NP_001356577; NP_001356578; NP_001356579 NP_001356580	NP_084225; NP_001345724
Location (UCSC)	Chr 9: 15.42 – 15.47 Mb	Chr 4: 83.42 – 83.47 Mb
PubMed search
- Wikidata
View/Edit Human	View/Edit Mouse

snRNA-activating protein complex subunit 3 is a protein that in humans is encoded by the SNAPC3 gene.

== Interactions ==
SNAPC3 has been shown to interact with SNAPC1 and retinoblastoma protein.
