= ANP32E =

Protein-coding gene in humans

Identifiers
- Aliases: ANP32E, LANP-L, LANPL, acidic nuclear phosphoprotein 32 family member E
- External IDs: OMIM: 609611; MGI: 1913721; GeneCards: ANP32E
Available structures
PDB	Ortholog search: PDBe RCSB
PDB	List of PDB id codes 4CAY, 4NFT

Gene location (Human)
Chr.	Chromosome 1 (human)
Band	1q21.2	Start	150,218,417 bp
Band	1q21.2	End	150,236,156 bp

Gene location (Mouse)
Chr.	Chromosome 3 (mouse)
Band	3|3 F2.1	Start	95,836,558 bp
Band	3|3 F2.1	End	95,854,702 bp
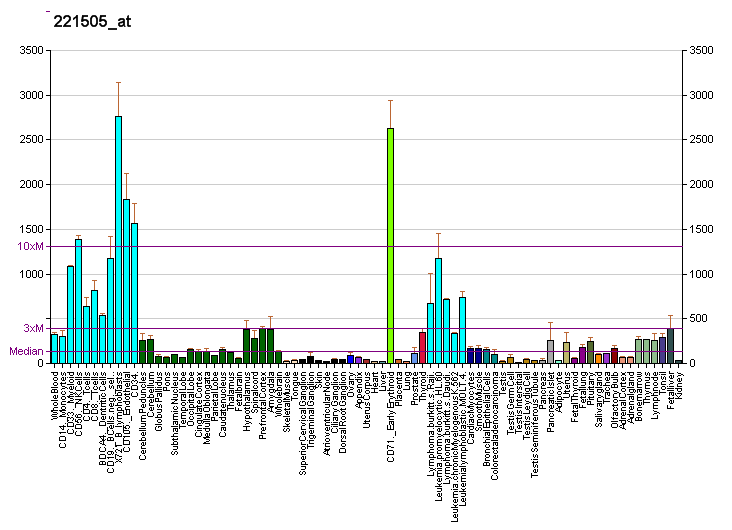

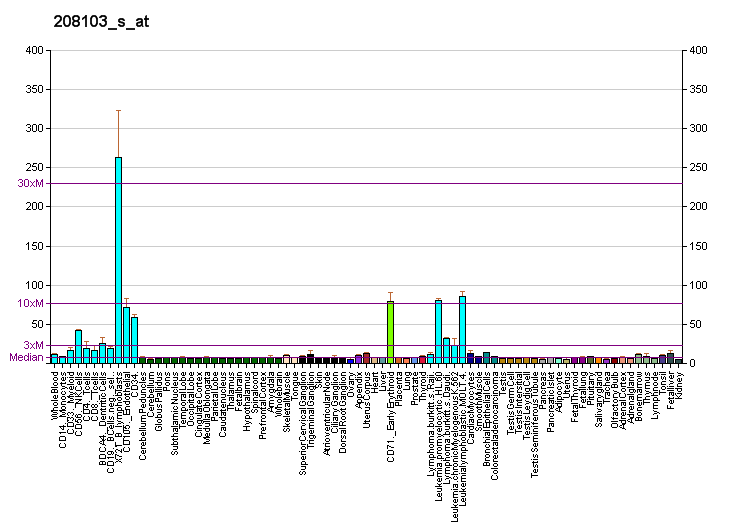
RNA expression pattern
Bgee	Human / Mouse (ortholog); Top expressed in: trabecular bone; caput epididymis; corpus epididymis; dorsal motor nucleus of vagus nerve; ventricular zone; epithelium of nasopharynx; retinal pigment epithelium; tail of epididymis; Epithelium of choroid plexus; gingival epithelium / Top expressed in: tail of embryo; neural layer of retina; genital tubercle; otic vesicle; pineal gland; otic placode; cumulus cell; saccule; ventricular zone; abdominal wall; More reference expression data
BioGPS	More reference expression data
Gene ontology
Molecular function	histone binding; phosphatase inhibitor activity
Cellular component	cytoplasm; nucleus; Swr1 complex; cytoplasmic vesicle
Biological process	negative regulation of catalytic activity; histone exchange; nucleosome assembly; nucleocytoplasmic transport; regulation of apoptotic process; chromatin organization
Sources:Amigo / QuickGO
Orthologs
Databases	NCBI: entry; OMA: entry
Species	Human	Mouse
Entrez	81611	66471
Ensembl	ENSG00000143401	ENSMUSG00000015749
UniProt	Q9BTT0	P97822
RefSeq (mRNA)	NM_001136478; NM_001136479; NM_001280559; NM_001280560; NM_030920	NM_001253757; NM_001253758; NM_023210
RefSeq (protein)	NP_001129950; NP_001129951; NP_001267488; NP_001267489; NP_112182	NP_001240686; NP_001240687; NP_075699
Location (UCSC)	Chr 1: 150.22 – 150.24 Mb	Chr 3: 95.84 – 95.85 Mb
PubMed search
- Wikidata
View/Edit Human	View/Edit Mouse

Acidic leucine-rich nuclear phosphoprotein 32 family member E is a protein that in humans is encoded by the ANP32E gene. The ANP32E gene is located on chromosome 1q22.

== Function ==
In mammalian cells, ANP32E has been shown to be an H2A.Z chaperone capable of promoting the removal of H2A.Z from chromatin. In brain tissue, ANP32E together with Cpd1 regulate protein phosphatase 2A activity at synapses during synaptogenesis and has been observed to form a complex with ANP32A and SET that stabilizes short-lived mRNAs containing AU-rich elements, as well as having acetyltransferase inhibitory activity (in a complex with SET) and having a role in chromatin remodeling and transcriptional regulation.

== See also ==
- ANP32A, ANP32B, ANP32C, ANP32D
