= ANP32D =

Protein-coding gene in humans

Identifiers
- Aliases: ANP32D, PP32R2, acidic nuclear phosphoprotein 32 family member D
- External IDs: OMIM: 606878; GeneCards: ANP32D

Gene location (Human)
Chr.	Chromosome 12 (human)
Band	12q13.11	Start	48,472,559 bp
Band	12q13.11	End	48,473,622 bp
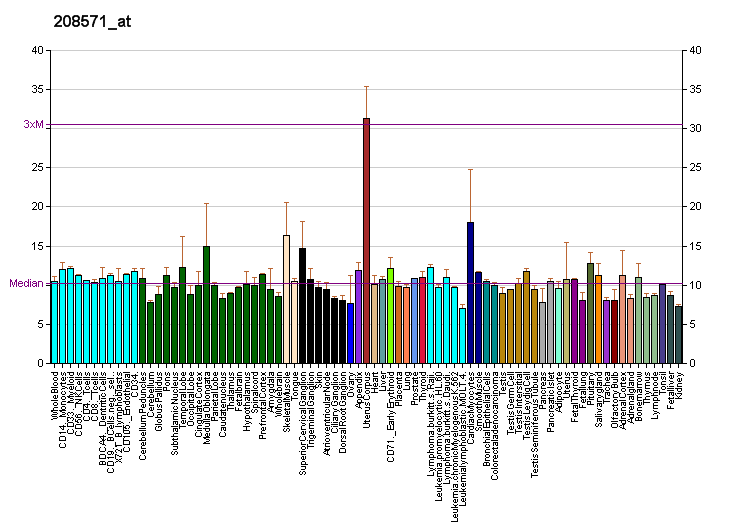
RNA expression pattern
Bgee	Human / Mouse (ortholog); Top expressed in: sural nerve; embryo; ganglionic eminence; urinary bladder; left adrenal gland; adrenal cortex; left adrenal cortex; right adrenal cortex; muscle of thigh; sigmoid colon / n/a; More reference expression data
BioGPS	More reference expression data
Gene ontology
Molecular function	histone binding
Cellular component	nucleus; perinuclear region of cytoplasm
Biological process	nucleosome assembly; nucleocytoplasmic transport; regulation of apoptotic process; histone exchange
Sources:Amigo / QuickGO
Orthologs
Databases	NCBI: entry; OMA: entry
Species	Human	Mouse
Entrez	23519	n/a
Ensembl	ENSG00000139223	n/a
UniProt	O95626	n/a
RefSeq (mRNA)	NM_012404	n/a
RefSeq (protein)	NP_036536	n/a
Location (UCSC)	Chr 12: 48.47 – 48.47 Mb	n/a
PubMed search		n/a
- Wikidata
View/Edit Human

Acidic leucine-rich nuclear phosphoprotein 32 family member D is a protein that in humans is encoded by the ANP32D gene.

Phosphoprotein 32 (PP32) is a tumor suppressor that can inhibit several types of cancers, including prostate and breast cancers. The protein encoded by this gene is one of at least two proteins that are similar in amino acid sequence to PP32 and are part of the same acidic nuclear phosphoprotein gene family. However, unlike PP32, the encoded protein is tumorigenic. The tumor suppressor function of PP32 has been localized to a 25 amino acid region that is absent in the protein encoded by this gene. This gene does not contain introns.

== See also ==
- ANP32A, ANP32B, ANP32C, ANP32E
