= Acidic leucine-rich nuclear phosphoprotein 32 family member A =

Protein-coding gene in the species Homo sapiens

ANP32A
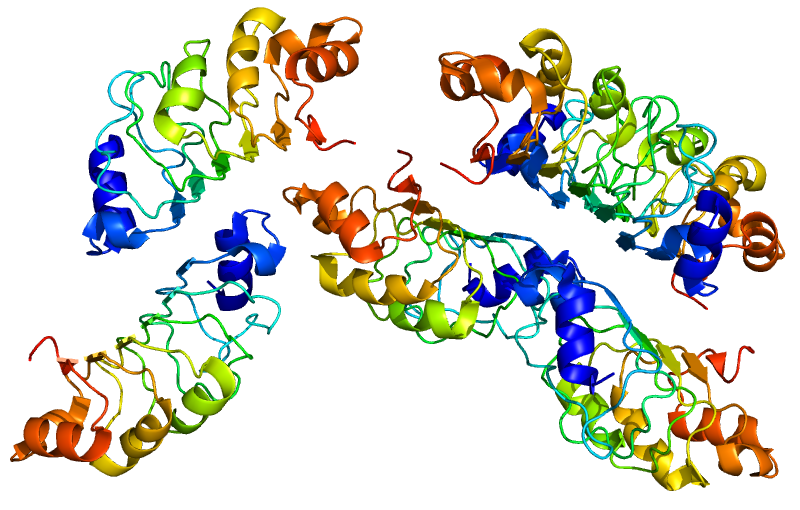

Identifiers
- Aliases: ANP32A, C15orf1, HPPCn, I1PP2A, LANP, MAPM, PHAP1, PHAPI, PP32, acidic nuclear phosphoprotein 32 family member A
- External IDs: OMIM: 600832; MGI: 108447; GeneCards: ANP32A
Available structures
| PDB | Ortholog search: PDBe RCSB |
| PDB | List of PDB id codes 2JE0, 2JE1, 4XOS |

Gene location (Human)
| Chr. | Chromosome 15 (human) |
| Band | 15q23 | Start | 68,778,535 bp |
| Band | 15q23 | End | 68,820,897 bp |

Gene location (Mouse)
| Chr. | Chromosome 9 (mouse) |
| Band | 9 B|9 33.68 cM | Start | 62,248,575 bp |
| Band | 9 B|9 33.68 cM | End | 62,286,094 bp |
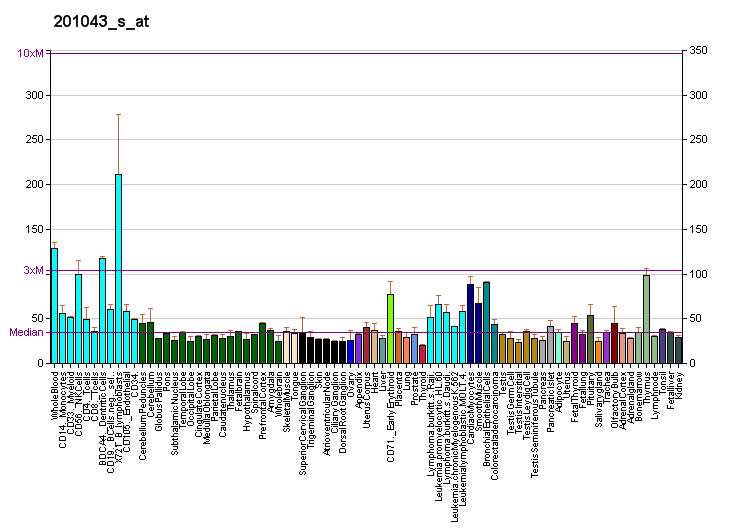

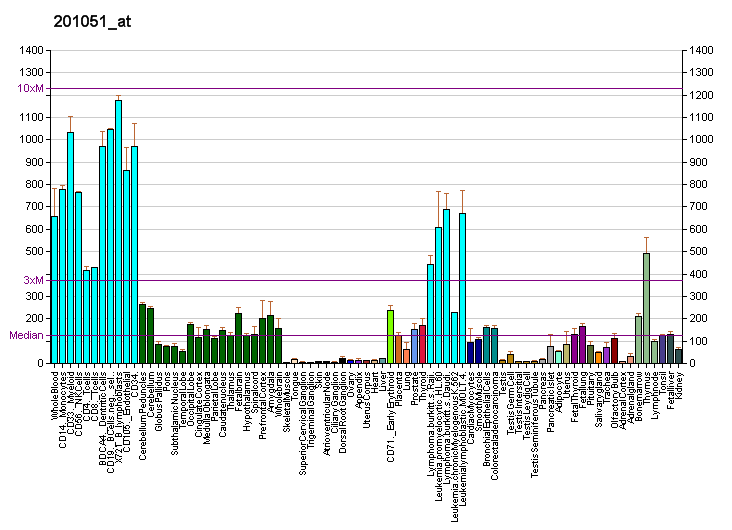

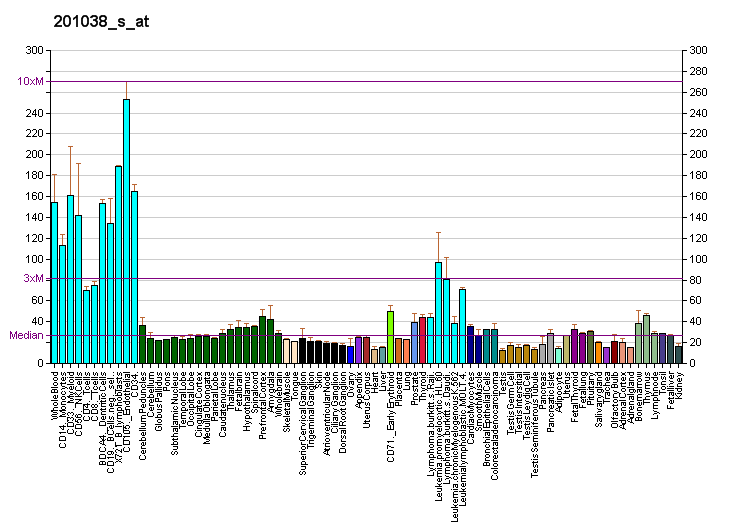
RNA expression pattern
| Bgee | Human / Mouse (ortholog); Top expressed in: ganglionic eminence; ventricular zone; monocyte; paraflocculus of cerebellum; middle frontal gyrus; rectum; blood; C1 segment; inferior ganglion of vagus nerve; granulocyte / Top expressed in: neural layer of retina; tail of embryo; genital tubercle; ventricular zone; granulocyte; maxillary prominence; dentate gyrus of hippocampal formation granule cell; mandibular prominence; superior frontal gyrus; migratory enteric neural crest cell; More reference expression data |
| BioGPS | More reference expression data |
Gene ontology
| Molecular function | protein binding; RNA binding; histone binding |
| Cellular component | cytoplasm; perinuclear region of cytoplasm; endoplasmic reticulum; nucleus; nucleoplasm |
| Biological process | intracellular signal transduction; regulation of transcription, DNA-templated; nucleocytoplasmic transport; transcription, DNA-templated; regulation of mRNA stability; nucleosome assembly; regulation of apoptotic process; histone exchange |
Sources:Amigo / QuickGO
Orthologs
| Databases | NCBI: entry; OMA: entry |
| Species | Human | Mouse |
| Entrez | 8125 | 11737 |
| Ensembl | ENSG00000140350 | ENSMUSG00000032249 |
| UniProt | P39687 | O35381 |
| RefSeq (mRNA) | NM_006305 | NM_009672 |
| RefSeq (protein) | NP_006296 | NP_033802 |
| Location (UCSC) | Chr 15: 68.78 – 68.82 Mb | Chr 9: 62.25 – 62.29 Mb |
| PubMed search |
- Wikidata
| View/Edit Human | View/Edit Mouse |

Acidic leucine-rich nuclear phosphoprotein 32 family member A is a protein that in humans is encoded by the ANP32A gene. It is one of the targets of an oncomiR, MIRN21.

== Interactions ==
Acidic leucine-rich nuclear phosphoprotein 32 family member A has been shown to interact with MAP1B, TAF1A and Protein SET.

== See also ==
- ANP32B, ANP32C, ANP32D, ANP32E
