= SNAPC4 =

Protein-coding gene in humans

Identifiers
- Aliases: SNAPC4, PTFalpha, SNAP190, small nuclear RNA activating complex polypeptide 4
- External IDs: OMIM: 602777; MGI: 2443935; GeneCards: SNAPC4

Gene location (Human)
Chr.	Chromosome 9 (human)
Band	9q34.3	Start	136,375,567 bp
Band	9q34.3	End	136,400,176 bp

Gene location (Mouse)
Chr.	Chromosome 2 (mouse)
Band	2|2 A3	Start	26,252,777 bp
Band	2|2 A3	End	26,270,665 bp
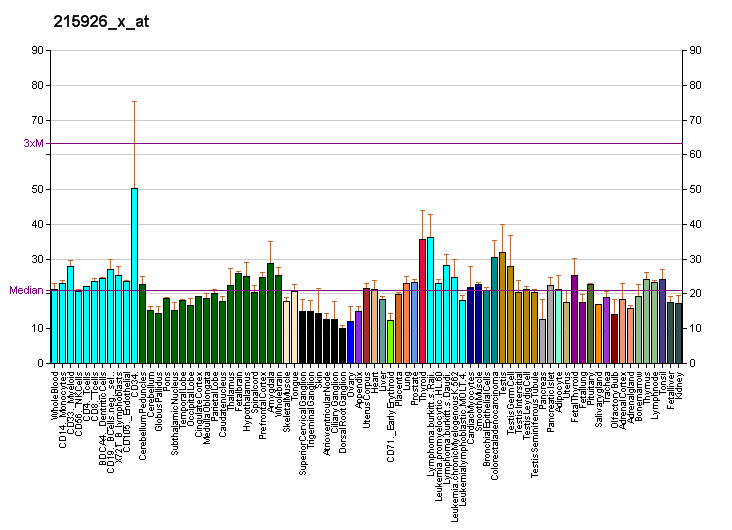

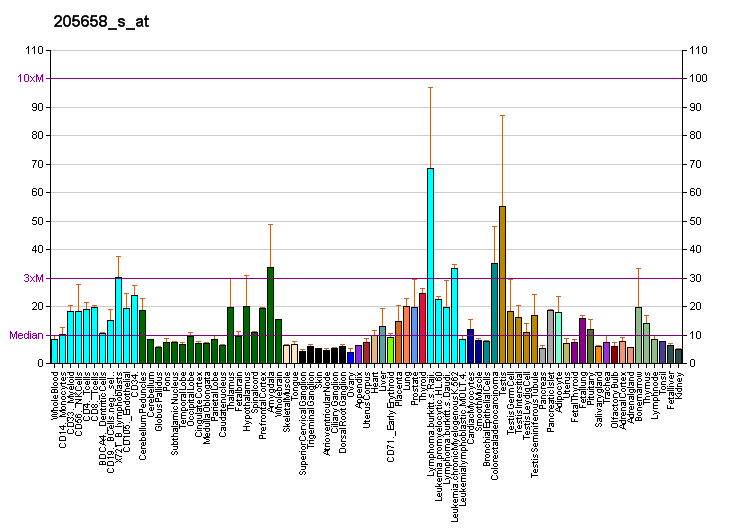
RNA expression pattern
Bgee	Human / Mouse (ortholog); Top expressed in: sural nerve; endothelial cell; right uterine tube; paraflocculus of cerebellum; right testis; left testis; right hemisphere of cerebellum; frontal pole; pancreatic ductal cell; nasal epithelium / Top expressed in: superior frontal gyrus; neural layer of retina; primary visual cortex; tail of embryo; genital tubercle; lumbar subsegment of spinal cord; spermatocyte; yolk sac; ventricular zone; cerebellar cortex; More reference expression data
BioGPS	More reference expression data
Gene ontology
Molecular function	DNA-binding transcription factor activity; DNA binding; sequence-specific DNA binding; DNA-binding transcription factor activity, RNA polymerase II-specific
Cellular component	nucleus; nucleoplasm; snRNA-activating protein complex
Biological process	regulation of transcription, DNA-templated; transcription by RNA polymerase II; transcription, DNA-templated; snRNA transcription by RNA polymerase III; transcription by RNA polymerase III; regulation of transcription by RNA polymerase II; snRNA transcription by RNA polymerase II; cell differentiation; snRNA transcription
Sources:Amigo / QuickGO
Orthologs
Databases	NCBI: entry; OMA: entry
Species	Human	Mouse
Entrez	6621	227644
Ensembl	ENSG00000165684	ENSMUSG00000036281
UniProt	Q5SXM2	Q8BP86
RefSeq (mRNA)	NM_003086; NM_001394201; NM_001394202; NM_001394203	NM_001290419; NM_172339
RefSeq (protein)	NP_003077	NP_001277348; NP_758842; NP_001393660; NP_001393661; NP_001393662 NP_001393663; NP_001393664; NP_001393665; NP_001393666; NP_001393667; NP_001393668
Location (UCSC)	Chr 9: 136.38 – 136.4 Mb	Chr 2: 26.25 – 26.27 Mb
PubMed search
- Wikidata
View/Edit Human	View/Edit Mouse

snRNA-activating protein complex subunit 4 is a protein that in humans is encoded by the SNAPC4 gene.

== Interactions ==
SNAPC4 has been shown to interact with SNAPC1, POU2F1 and SNAPC2.
