= CTCFL =

Protein-coding gene in the species Homo sapiens

Identifiers
- Aliases: CTCFL, BORIS, CT27, CTCF-T, HMGB1L1, dJ579F20.2, CCCTC-binding factor like
- External IDs: OMIM: 607022; MGI: 3652571; GeneCards: CTCFL

Gene location (Mouse)
Chr.	Chromosome 2 (mouse)
Band	2|2 H3	Start	172,935,402 bp
Band	2|2 H3	End	172,961,318 bp
RNA expression pattern
Bgee	Human / Mouse (ortholog); Top expressed in: secondary oocyte; renal cortex; lymph node; blood; liver; right lobe of liver; kidney; duodenum; triceps surae; gastrocnemius muscle / Top expressed in: spinal ganglia; white adipose tissue; trigeminal ganglion; pons; anterior horn of spinal cord; ganglion of vagus nerve; piriform cortex; glossopharyngeal ganglion; spermatid; greater petrosal nerve; More reference expression data
BioGPS	n/a
Gene ontology
Molecular function	DNA binding; sequence-specific DNA binding; histone binding; DNA-binding transcription activator activity, RNA polymerase II-specific; metal ion binding; RNA polymerase II cis-regulatory region sequence-specific DNA binding; protein binding; nucleic acid binding; DNA-binding transcription factor activity, RNA polymerase II-specific
Cellular component	nucleus; cytoplasm
Biological process	regulation of gene expression by genetic imprinting; regulation of transcription, DNA-templated; regulation of histone H3-K4 methylation; DNA methylation involved in gamete generation; transcription, DNA-templated; positive regulation of transcription, DNA-templated; positive regulation of gene expression; cell cycle; histone methylation; positive regulation of transcription by RNA polymerase II; transcription by RNA polymerase II; chromatin organization
Sources:Amigo / QuickGO
Orthologs
Databases	NCBI: entry
Species	Human	Mouse
Entrez	140690	664799
Ensembl	n/a	ENSMUSG00000070495
UniProt	Q8NI51	A2APF3
RefSeq (mRNA)	NM_001269040; NM_001269041; NM_001269042; NM_001269043; NM_001269044 NM_001269045; NM_001269046; NM_001269047; NM_001269048; NM_001269049; NM_001269050; NM_001269051; NM_001269052; NM_001269054; NM_001269055; NM_080618; NM_001386993; NM_001386994; NM_001386995; NM_001386996; NM_001386997	NM_001081387; NM_001355185
RefSeq (protein)	NP_001255969; NP_001255970; NP_001255971; NP_001255972; NP_001255973 NP_001255974; NP_001255975; NP_001255976; NP_001255977; NP_001255978; NP_001255979; NP_001255980; NP_001255981; NP_001255983; NP_001255984; NP_542185	NP_001074856; NP_001342114
Location (UCSC)	n/a	Chr 2: 172.94 – 172.96 Mb
PubMed search
- Wikidata
View/Edit Human	View/Edit Mouse

Transcriptional repressor CTCFL also known as BORIS (Brother of Regulator of Imprinted Sites) is a protein that in humans is encoded by the CTCFL gene.

== Function ==
CCCTC-binding factor (CTCF), an 11-zinc finger factor involved in gene regulation, utilizes different zinc fingers to bind varying DNA target sites. CTCF forms methylation-sensitive insulators that regulate X-chromosome inactivation. Transcriptional repressor CTCFL (this protein) is a paralog of CTCF and appears to be expressed primarily in the cytoplasm of spermatocytes, unlike CTCF which is expressed primarily in the nucleus of somatic cells. CTCF and CTCFL are normally expressed in a mutually exclusive pattern that correlates with resetting of methylation marks during male germ cell differentiation.
