= UBTF =

Protein-coding gene in the species Homo sapiens

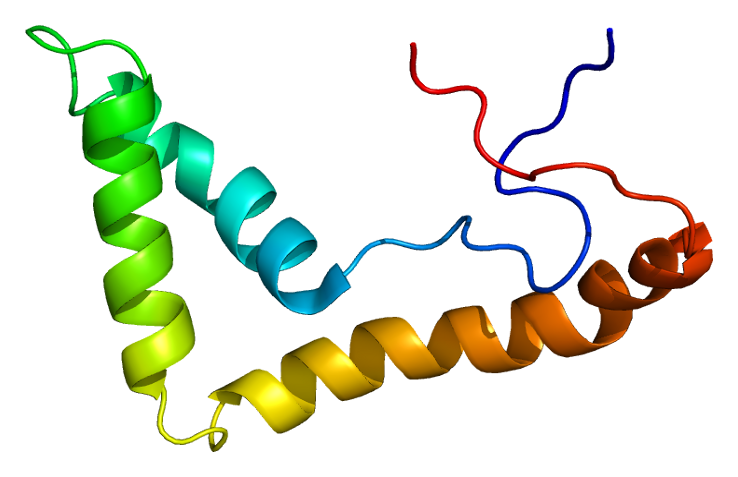

Identifiers
- Aliases: UBTF, NOR-90, UBF, UBF-1, UBF1, UBF2, upstream binding transcription factor, RNA polymerase I, CONDBA, upstream binding transcription factor
- External IDs: OMIM: 600673; MGI: 98512; GeneCards: UBTF
Available structures
| PDB | Ortholog search: PDBe RCSB |
| PDB | List of PDB id codes 1K99, 1L8Y, 1L8Z, 2HDZ |

Gene location (Human)
| Chr. | Chromosome 17 (human) |
| Band | 17q21.31 | Start | 44,205,033 bp |
| Band | 17q21.31 | End | 44,221,626 bp |

Gene location (Mouse)
| Chr. | Chromosome 11 (mouse) |
| Band | 11|11 D | Start | 102,195,386 bp |
| Band | 11|11 D | End | 102,210,568 bp |
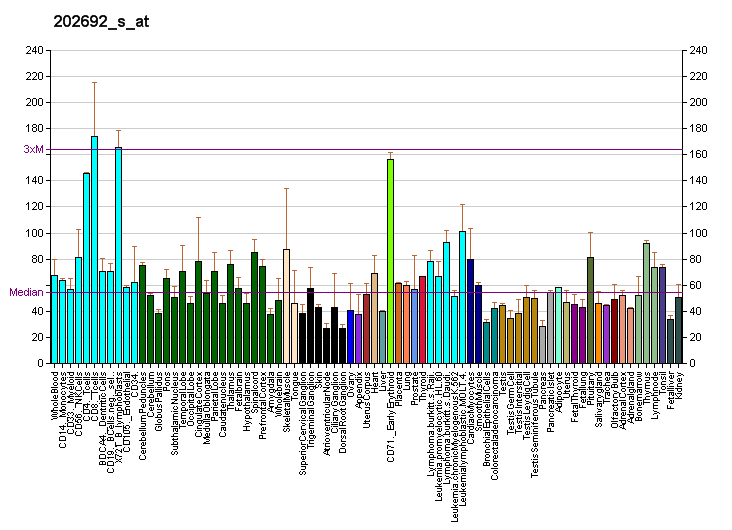

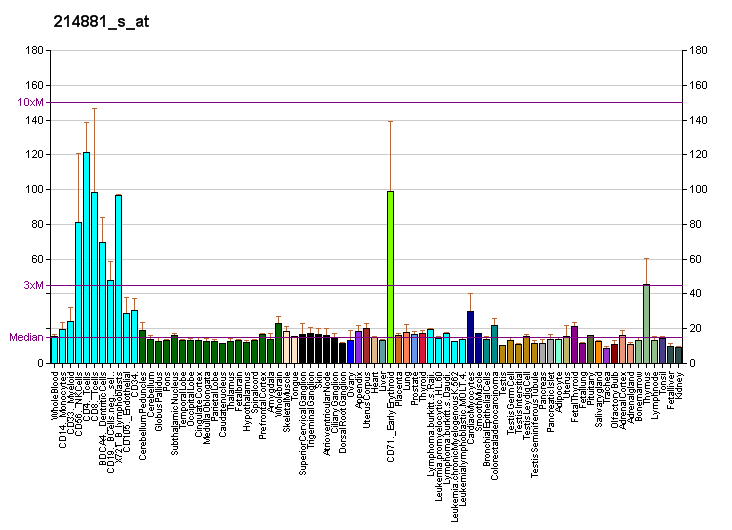
RNA expression pattern
| Bgee | Human / Mouse (ortholog); Top expressed in: sural nerve; ganglionic eminence; granulocyte; right lobe of thyroid gland; ventricular zone; right coronary artery; right hemisphere of cerebellum; left lobe of thyroid gland; ectocervix; body of uterus / Top expressed in: ventricular zone; neural layer of retina; genital tubercle; tail of embryo; lip; dentate gyrus of hippocampal formation granule cell; granulocyte; superior frontal gyrus; tibiofemoral joint; thymus; More reference expression data |
| BioGPS | More reference expression data |
Gene ontology
| Molecular function | DNA binding; RNA polymerase I core promoter sequence-specific DNA binding; RNA polymerase I cis-regulatory region sequence-specific DNA binding; protein binding; chromatin binding; RNA binding; scaffold protein binding; DNA-binding transcription factor activity, RNA polymerase II-specific |
| Cellular component | nucleolus; nucleus; nucleoplasm; fibrillar center |
| Biological process | transcription initiation from RNA polymerase I promoter; transcription by RNA polymerase I; termination of RNA polymerase I transcription; positive regulation of transcription by RNA polymerase I; transcription elongation from RNA polymerase I promoter; regulation of glucose mediated signaling pathway; regulation of transcription, DNA-templated; transcription, DNA-templated; regulation of transcription by RNA polymerase I; RNA polymerase I preinitiation complex assembly; regulation of transcription by RNA polymerase II |
Sources:Amigo / QuickGO
Orthologs
| Databases | NCBI: entry; OMA: entry |
| Species | Human | Mouse |
| Entrez | 7343 | 21429 |
| Ensembl | ENSG00000108312 | ENSMUSG00000020923 |
| UniProt | P17480 | P25976 |
| RefSeq (mRNA) | NM_001076683; NM_001076684; NM_014233 | NM_001044383; NM_011551; NM_001302954; NM_001302955; NM_001362544 NM_001362545; NM_001362547; NM_001362548; NM_001362549; NM_001362550; NM_001362551; NM_001362552 |
| RefSeq (protein) | NP_001070151; NP_001070152; NP_055048 | n/a |
| Location (UCSC) | Chr 17: 44.21 – 44.22 Mb | Chr 11: 102.2 – 102.21 Mb |
| PubMed search |
- Wikidata
| View/Edit Human | View/Edit Mouse |

Upstream binding transcription factor (UBTF), or upstream binding factor (UBF), is a protein that in humans is encoded by the UBTF gene.

== Gene ==
In humans, the UBTF gene encodes a 764 amino acid protein and is located on chromosome 17 at position q21.31. In mice, UBTF is found on chromosome 11.

== Structure ==
UBTF contains six high mobility group boxes (HMG-boxes) that allow it to bind to DNA. UBTF also contains a hyperacidic carboxy-terminal domain, which is required for transcription activation, and a helix-gap-helix dimersation motif (as UBTF is thought to often act as a dimer).

In humans, alternative splicing can give rise to either the UBTF1 or UBTF2 isoform which are 97 kD and 94 kD in mass, respectively UBTF2 lacks exon 8 of the larger UBTF1 isoform which encodes a portion of HMG Box 2.

== Function ==
UBTF is a transcription factor required for expression of the 18S, 5.8S, and 28S ribosomal RNAs, along with SL1 (a complex of TBP (MIM 600075) and three TBP-associated factors or 'TAFs').

UBTF is a nucleolar phosphoprotein with both DNA binding and transactivation domains. Sequence-specific DNA binding to the core and upstream control elements of the human rRNA promoter is mediated through several HMG boxes. [supplied by OMIM]

In vertebrates, UBTF plays a crucial role in maintaining rDNA chromatin in a euchromatic state. Consequently, UBTF binding is one of the characteristics of euchromatic, transcriptionally active rDNA repeats.

UBTF2 has been found to regulate mRNA transcription by RNA Polymerase II.

== Clinical significance ==
UBTF may have a role in cancer. Increased UBF binding to rDNA has been observed in cancer cells and is associated with elevated rDNA transcription and tumor cell survival. Supporting this, it was found that cisplatin, a chemotherapy drug, can displace UBTF from rDNA, causing a reduction in rRNA synthesis and subsequent p53-independent apoptosis.

Additionally, UBTF has been found to facilitate melanoma by promoting GIT1 expression which, in turn, activates MEK1/2-ERK1/2 signaling pathways.

UBTF may also be important to neurological functioning. A de novo gain-of-function mutation to UBTF (c.628G>A) has been found to cause developmental neuroregression. This mutation replaces glutamic acid with lysine at position 210 of the polypeptide chain (p.Glu210Lys) which results in a stronger UBTF interaction with DNA. In 2022, another likely pathogenic variant (Gln203Arg) was identified in a proband with severe early-onset developmental delay.

== Interactions ==
UBTF has been shown to interact with:

- CSNK2A1,
- RB1,
- TAF1C, and
- TAF1.
