= TAF1B =

Protein-coding gene in the species Homo sapiens

Identifiers
- Aliases: TAF1B, MGC:9349, RAF1B, RAFI63, SL1, TAFI63, TATA-box binding protein associated factor, RNA polymerase I subunit B
- External IDs: OMIM: 604904; MGI: 109577; HomoloGene: 31331; GeneCards: TAF1B; OMA:TAF1B - orthologs

Gene location (Human)
Chr.	Chromosome 2 (human)
Band	2p25.1	Start	9,843,443 bp
Band	2p25.1	End	9,934,416 bp

Gene location (Mouse)
Chr.	Chromosome 12 (mouse)
Band	12|12 A1.3	Start	24,548,358 bp
Band	12|12 A1.3	End	24,608,538 bp
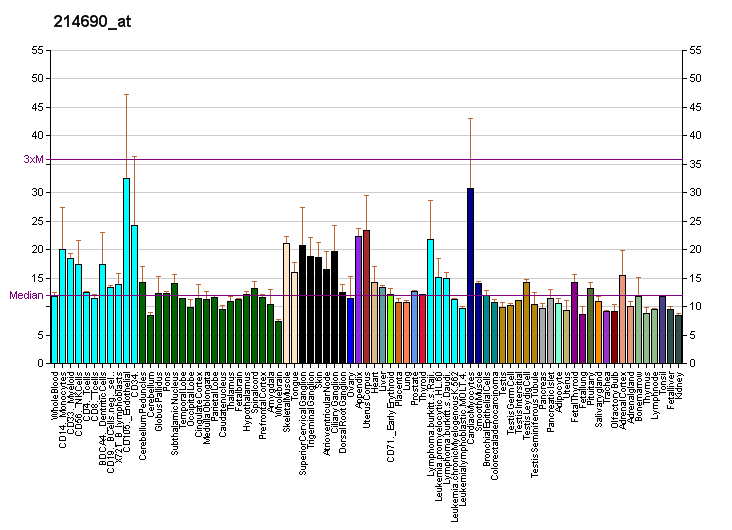

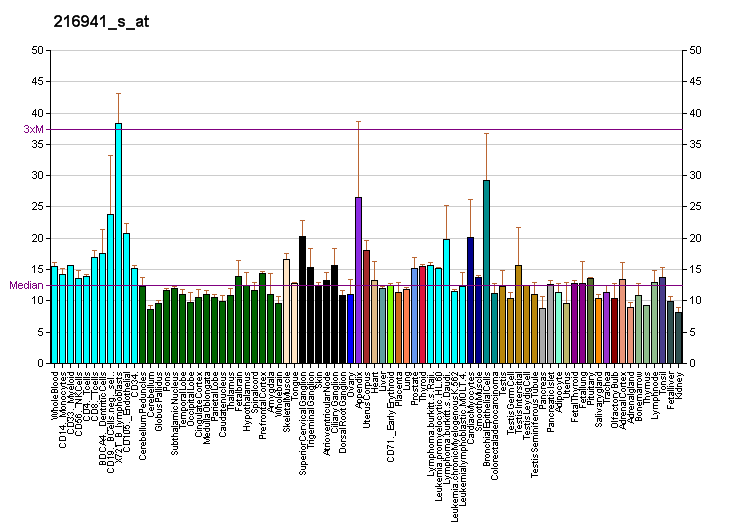
RNA expression pattern
Bgee	Human / Mouse (ortholog); Top expressed in: testicle; gonad; Achilles tendon; buccal mucosa cell; ventricular zone; monocyte; islet of Langerhans; stromal cell of endometrium; secondary oocyte; olfactory zone of nasal mucosa / Top expressed in: spermatocyte; zygote; secondary oocyte; seminiferous tubule; yolk sac; tail of embryo; dentate gyrus of hippocampal formation granule cell; morula; morula; genital tubercle; More reference expression data
BioGPS	More reference expression data
Gene ontology
Molecular function	DNA binding; DNA-binding transcription factor activity; metal ion binding; protein binding; TBP-class protein binding; RNA polymerase I core promoter sequence-specific DNA binding
Cellular component	nucleoplasm; RNA polymerase transcription factor SL1 complex; nucleolus; nucleus; RNA polymerase I core factor complex
Biological process	termination of RNA polymerase I transcription; epigenetic maintenance of chromatin in transcription-competent conformation; regulation of transcription, DNA-templated; transcription initiation from RNA polymerase I promoter; transcription, DNA-templated; transcription by RNA polymerase I; RNA polymerase I preinitiation complex assembly; nucleolar large rRNA transcription by RNA polymerase I; transcription elongation from RNA polymerase I promoter
Sources:Amigo / QuickGO
Orthologs
Species	Human	Mouse
Entrez	9014	21340
Ensembl	ENSG00000115750	ENSMUSG00000059669
UniProt	Q53T94	P97358
RefSeq (mRNA)	NM_005680; NM_001318976; NM_001318977	NM_020614
RefSeq (protein)	NP_001305905; NP_001305906; NP_005671	NP_065639
Location (UCSC)	Chr 2: 9.84 – 9.93 Mb	Chr 12: 24.55 – 24.61 Mb
PubMed search
- Wikidata
View/Edit Human	View/Edit Mouse

TATA box-binding protein-associated factor RNA polymerase I subunit B is an enzyme that in humans is encoded by the TAF1B gene.

== Function ==
Initiation of transcription by RNA polymerase I requires the formation of a complex composed of the TATA-binding protein (TBP) and three TBP-associated factors (TAFs) specific for RNA polymerase I. This complex, known as SL1, binds to the core promoter of ribosomal RNA genes to position the polymerase properly and acts as a channel for regulatory signals. This gene encodes one of the SL1-specific TAFs.

== Interactions ==
TAF1B has been shown to interact with RRN3.
