= Transcription factor IIIB 50 kDa subunit =

Protein-coding gene in the species Homo sapiens

BRF2

Identifiers
- Aliases: BRF2, BRFU, TFIIIB50, RNA polymerase III transcription initiation factor 50 kDa subunit, RNA polymerase III transcription initiation factor subunit, BRF2 RNA polymerase III transcription initiation factor subunit
- External IDs: OMIM: 607013; MGI: 1913903; GeneCards: BRF2
Available structures
PDB	Ortholog search: PDBe RCSB
PDB	List of PDB id codes 4ROD, 4ROE, 4ROC

Gene location (Human)
Chr.	Chromosome 8 (human)
Band	8p11.23	Start	37,843,268 bp
Band	8p11.23	End	37,849,861 bp

Gene location (Mouse)
Chr.	Chromosome 8 (mouse)
Band	8|8 A2	Start	27,613,392 bp
Band	8|8 A2	End	27,618,708 bp
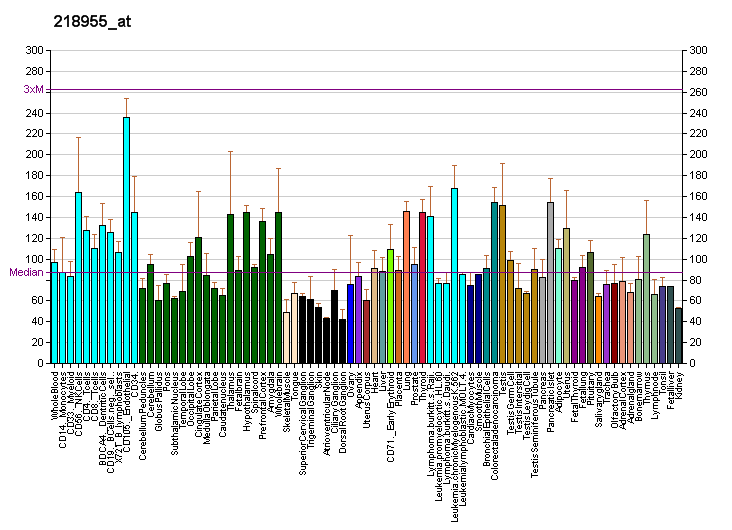

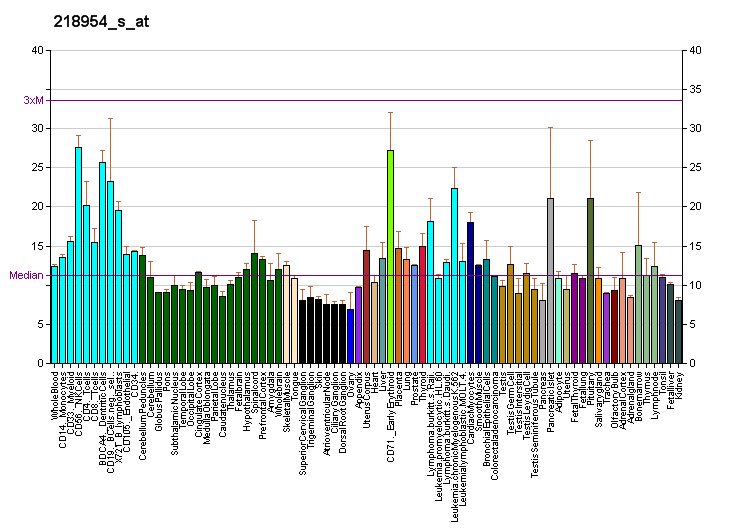
RNA expression pattern
Bgee	Human / Mouse (ortholog); Top expressed in: Skeletal muscle tissue of rectus abdominis; tibialis anterior muscle; deltoid muscle; Skeletal muscle tissue of biceps brachii; gastrocnemius muscle; quadriceps femoris muscle; vastus lateralis muscle; decidua; beta cell; muscle of thigh / Top expressed in: primary oocyte; spermatid; spermatocyte; zygote; secondary oocyte; interventricular septum; seminiferous tubule; morula; hand; superior cervical ganglion; More reference expression data
BioGPS	More reference expression data
Gene ontology
Molecular function	metal ion binding; RNA polymerase III type 3 promoter sequence-specific DNA binding; transcription factor binding
Cellular component	nucleus; nucleoplasm; transcription factor TFIIIB complex
Biological process	regulation of transcription, DNA-templated; transcription, DNA-templated; regulation of transcription by RNA polymerase III; cellular response to oxidative stress; transcription preinitiation complex assembly; DNA-templated transcription, initiation; RNA polymerase III preinitiation complex assembly
Sources:Amigo / QuickGO
Orthologs
Databases	NCBI: entry; OMA: entry
Species	Human	Mouse
Entrez	55290	66653
Ensembl	ENSG00000104221	ENSMUSG00000031487
UniProt	Q9HAW0	Q3UAW9
RefSeq (mRNA)	NM_018310	NM_025686
RefSeq (protein)	NP_060780	NP_079962
Location (UCSC)	Chr 8: 37.84 – 37.85 Mb	Chr 8: 27.61 – 27.62 Mb
PubMed search
- Wikidata
View/Edit Human	View/Edit Mouse

Transcription factor IIIB 50 kDa subunit (TFIIIB50) also known as b-related factor 2 (BRF-2) is a protein that in humans is encoded by the BRF2 gene.

== Function ==
This gene encodes one of the multiple subunits of the RNA polymerase III transcription factor complex required for transcription of genes with promoter elements upstream of the initiation site. The product of this gene, a TFIIB-like factor, is directly recruited to the TATA box of polymerase III small nuclear RNA gene promoters through its interaction with the TATA-binding protein.
