= TAF1C =

Protein-coding gene in the species Homo sapiens

Identifiers
- Aliases: TAF1C, MGC:39976, SL1, TAFI110, TAFI95, TATA-box binding protein associated factor, RNA polymerase I subunit C
- External IDs: OMIM: 604905; MGI: 109576; HomoloGene: 21163; GeneCards: TAF1C; OMA:TAF1C - orthologs

Gene location (Human)
Chr.	Chromosome 16 (human)
Band	16q24.1	Start	84,177,847 bp
Band	16q24.1	End	84,187,070 bp

Gene location (Mouse)
Chr.	Chromosome 8 (mouse)
Band	8|8 E1	Start	120,324,610 bp
Band	8|8 E1	End	120,331,961 bp
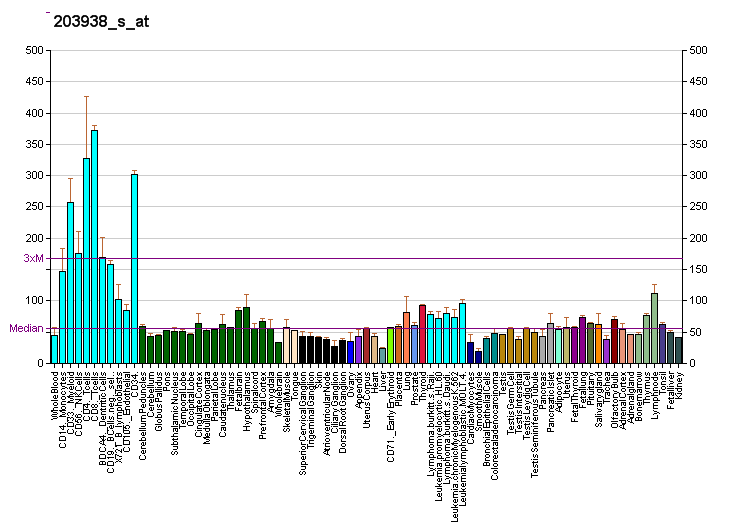

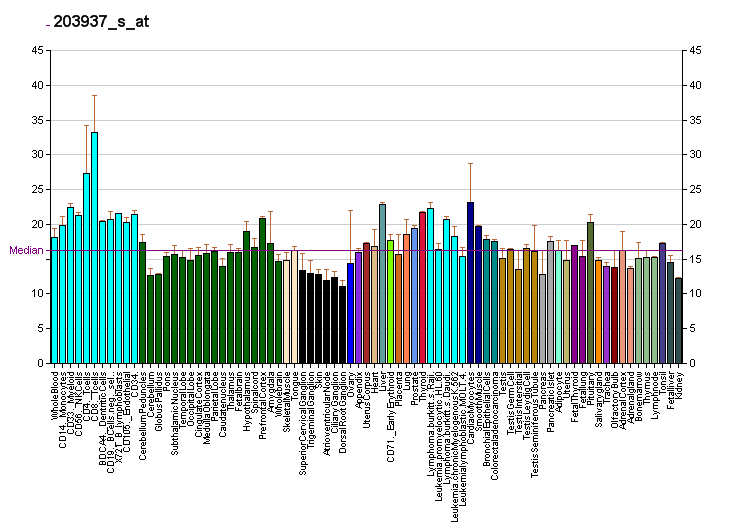
RNA expression pattern
Bgee	Human / Mouse (ortholog); Top expressed in: left ovary; right ovary; body of uterus; right lobe of thyroid gland; canal of the cervix; left lobe of thyroid gland; right uterine tube; spleen; gastric mucosa; apex of heart / Top expressed in: saccule; otic placode; otic vesicle; Ileal epithelium; internal carotid artery; external carotid artery; corneal stroma; crypt of lieberkuhn of small intestine; Rostral migratory stream; thymus; More reference expression data
BioGPS	More reference expression data
Gene ontology
Molecular function	DNA binding; protein binding; RNA polymerase I core promoter sequence-specific DNA binding
Cellular component	RNA polymerase I transcription regulator complex; fibrillar center; nucleoplasm; nucleolus; nucleus
Biological process	termination of RNA polymerase I transcription; transcription initiation from RNA polymerase I promoter; epigenetic maintenance of chromatin in transcription-competent conformation; transcription, DNA-templated; regulation of transcription, DNA-templated; transcription by RNA polymerase II; regulation of transcription by RNA polymerase I; RNA polymerase I preinitiation complex assembly; transcription by RNA polymerase I; transcription elongation from RNA polymerase I promoter
Sources:Amigo / QuickGO
Orthologs
Species	Human	Mouse
Entrez	9013	21341
Ensembl	ENSG00000103168	ENSMUSG00000031832
UniProt	Q15572	Q6PDZ2
RefSeq (mRNA)	NM_001243156; NM_001243157; NM_001243158; NM_001243159; NM_001243160 NM_005679; NM_139353	NM_021441; NM_001378901
RefSeq (protein)	NP_001230085; NP_001230086; NP_001230087; NP_001230088; NP_001230089 NP_005670; NP_647610	NP_067416; NP_001365830
Location (UCSC)	Chr 16: 84.18 – 84.19 Mb	Chr 8: 120.32 – 120.33 Mb
PubMed search
- Wikidata
View/Edit Human	View/Edit Mouse

TATA box-binding protein-associated factor RNA polymerase I subunit C is an enzyme that in humans is encoded by the TAF1C gene.

== Function ==
Initiation of transcription by RNA polymerase I requires the formation of a complex composed of the TATA-binding protein (TBP) and three TBP-associated factors (TAFs) specific for RNA polymerase I. This complex, known as SL1, binds to the core promoter of ribosomal RNA genes to position the polymerase properly and acts as a channel for regulatory signals. This gene encodes the largest SL1-specific TAF. Two transcripts encoding different isoforms have been identified.

== Interactions ==
TAF1C has been shown to interact with UBTF.
