= Diversibipalium catenatum =

Scientific classification
- Kingdom: Animalia
- Phylum: Platyhelminthes
- Order: Tricladida
- Family: Geoplanidae
- Genus: Diversibipalium
- Species: D. catenatum

Binomial name
- Diversibipalium catenatum (Graff, 1898)

Synonyms
- Bipalium catenatum Graff, 1898

Species of flatworm

Diversibipalium catenatum is a species of land planarian within the family Geoplanidae. The species is endemic to the Philippines on the island Palawan. The coloration of the species is a yellow body with elongated black spots running along both sides of the body.
