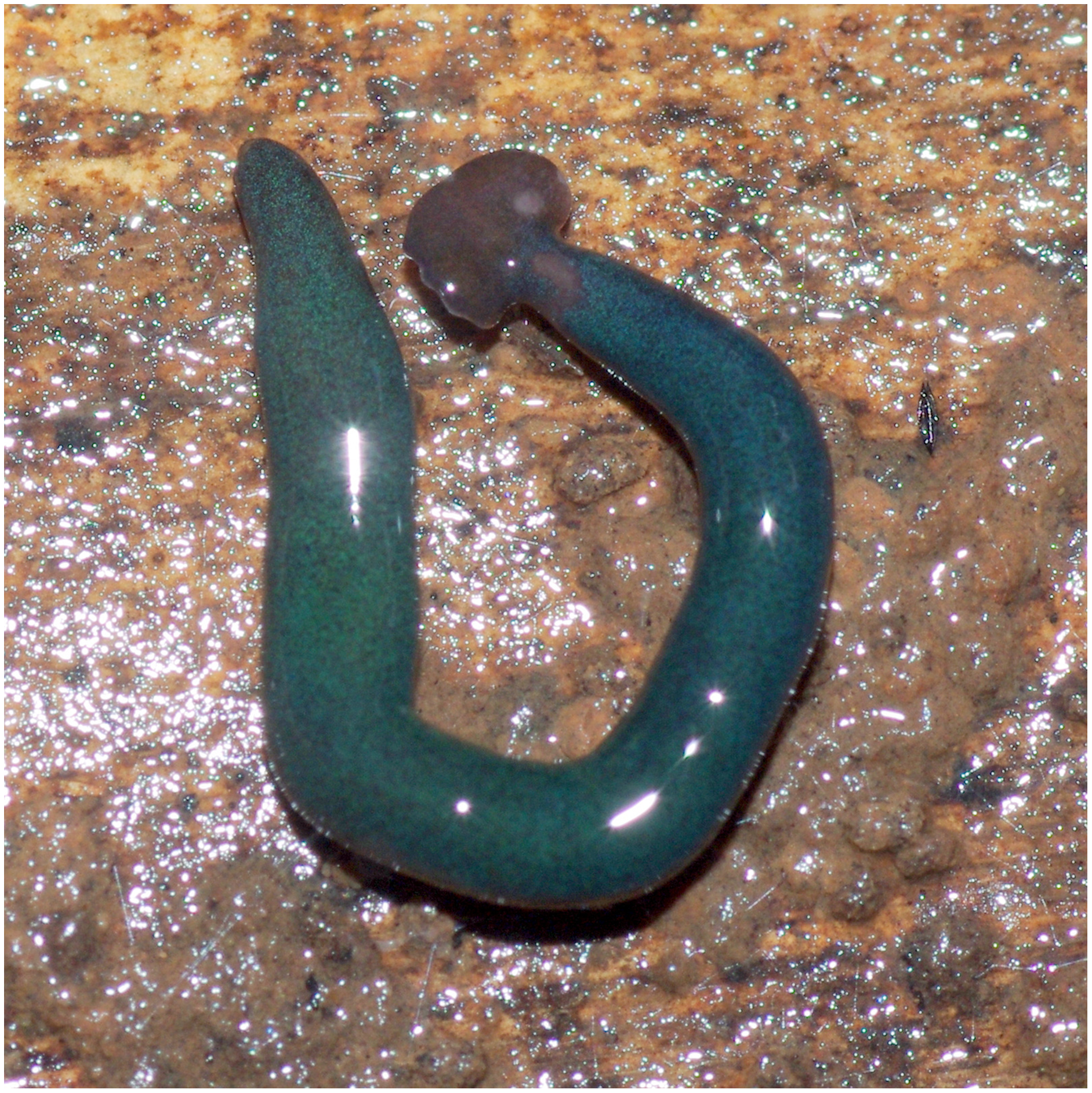
- Diversibipalium mayottensis

Scientific classification
- Kingdom: Animalia
- Phylum: Platyhelminthes
- Order: Tricladida
- Family: Geoplanidae
- Genus: Diversibipalium
- Species: D. mayottensis

Binomial name
- Diversibipalium mayottensis Justine, Gastineau, Gros, Gey, Ruzzier, Charles & Winsor, 2022

Synonyms
- Diversibipalium "blue" of Justine et al., 2018.

= Diversibipalium mayottensis =

Species of flatworm

Diversibipalium mayottensis is a species of predatory land flatworm, found only in Mayotte.

== Description ==
The species is about 30–45 mm in length. The headplate is a rusty-brown colour. The rest of the body has a characteristic colour pattern, with its dorsal side being an iridescent blue–green ("dark turquoise glitter").

The species was formally described in 2022 after a comparative study of several species of land flatworms of the subfamily Bipaliinae, including the description of the complete mitochondrial genome in several species.

== Distribution and origin ==
Diversibipalium mayottensis has been recorded only from Mayotte, a French island in the Mozambique Channel, where it was found the first time in 2015.

The origin of the species is unknown, but the scientists who described it hypothesized that it could have been brought from Madagascar, where other species of bipaliines are known.

== Genetics and phylogenetic relationships ==
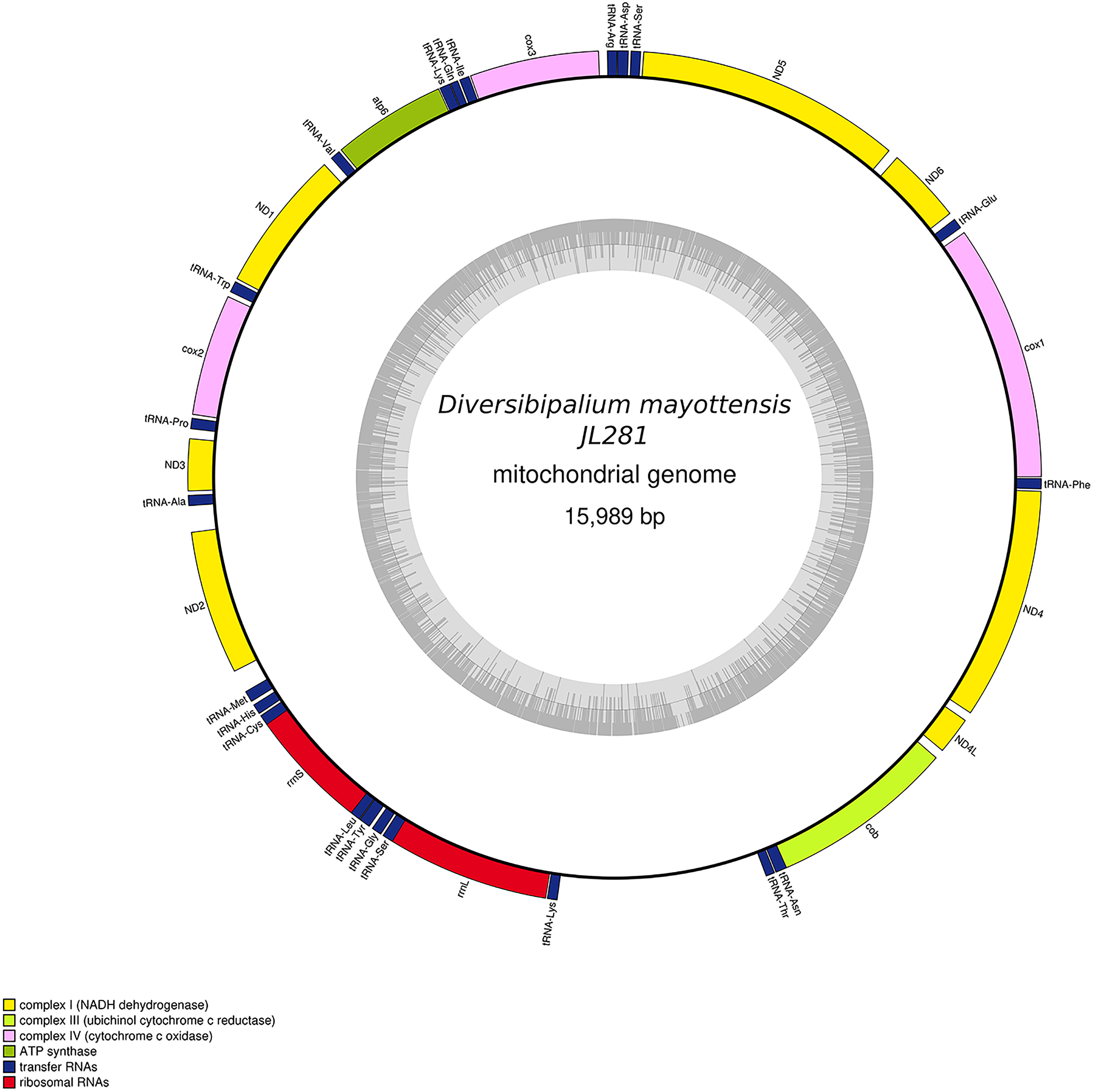
The mitogenome of Diversibipalium mayottensis

The mitochondrial genome of Diversibipalium mayottensis is circular, 15,989 base pairs in length and contains 12 protein coding genes, two ribosomal RNA genes and 22 transfer RNA genes.

A phylogenetic analysis based on mitochondrial genes and nuclear genes such as LSU and SSU found that Diversibipalium mayottensis was the sister group to all other species of hammerhead flatworms, suggesting that a new genus should be created to accommodate it but the scientists refrained from doing so in the absence of anatomical information. Therefore, the species was included in the genus Diversibipalium Kawakatsu et al., 2002, a collective group created to accommodate species whose anatomy of the copulatory apparatus is still unknown.
