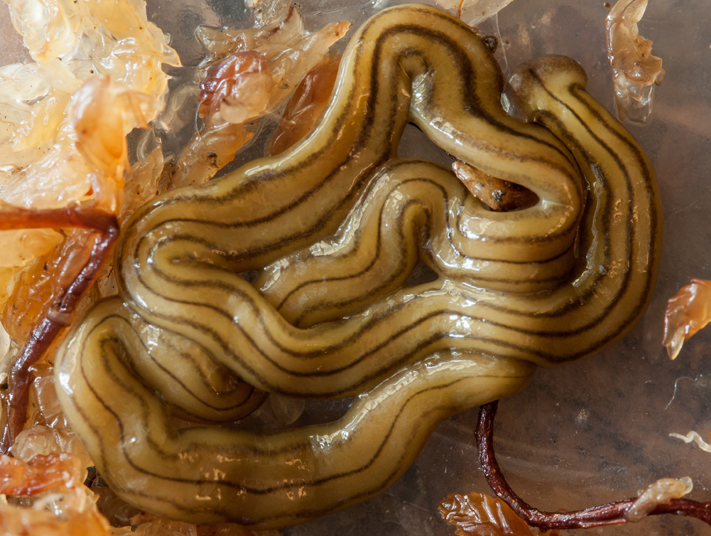
- Diversibipalium multilineatum

Scientific classification
- Kingdom: Animalia
- Phylum: Platyhelminthes
- Order: Tricladida
- Family: Geoplanidae
- Subfamily: Bipaliinae
- Genus: Diversibipalium; Kawakatsu, Ogren, Froehlich & Sasaki, 2002

Type species
- No type species

= Diversibipalium =

Genus of flatworms

Predatory flatworm Diversibipalium sp. crawling on a path in Thomson Nature Park, Singapore

Diversibipalium is a genus of land planarians of the subfamily Bipaliinae (hammerhead flatworms). It was erected to include species lacking sufficient morphological information to allow them to be classified in the appropriate genus.

== Taxonomy ==
During the second half of the 19th century and the first half of the 20th century, many land planarian species were described based solely on external characters. Currently, the genera of land planarians are highly based on their internal anatomy, especially the anatomy of the copulatory apparatus. As a result, species with old descriptions that were never redescribed, so that their internal anatomy remains unknown, cannot be assigned to the correct genus. Thus, the genus Diversibipalium was created to temporarily accommodate species of the subfamily Bipaliinae whose anatomy of the copulatory apparatus is still unknown.

== Species ==
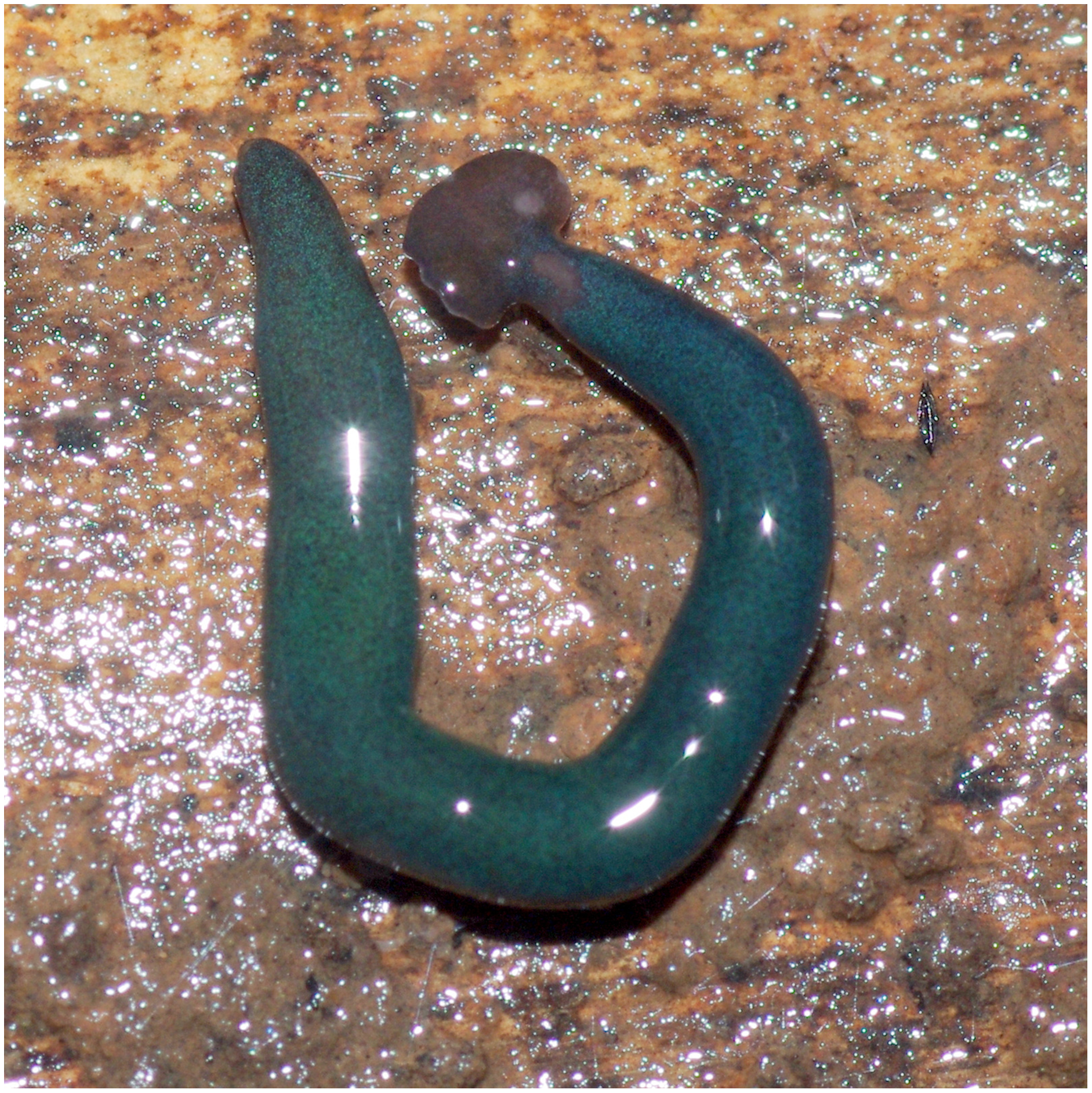
Diversibipalium mayottensis

Diversibipalium multilineatum (Makino & Shirasawa, 1983) is a large-size invasive species, originally from Japan, now found in several European countries. It is superficially similar to Bipalium kewense, which is even more widespread in the world, but can be easily distinguished by the marking on its head (D. multilineatum has an 'exclamation point' on the head).

Diversibipalium mayottensis Justine, Gastineau, Gros, Gey, Ruzzier, Charles & Winsor, 2022 is a small-size species, found only in the French island of Mayotte, in the Indian Ocean. According to a comparative study of the mitochondrial genomes and other genes, D. mayottensis is the sister-group to all other bipaliines.

The genus Diversibipalium currently contains the following species:

- Diversibipalium andrewsi (Whitehouse, 1919)
- Diversibipalium bleekeri (Graff, 1898)
- Diversibipalium boehmigi (Müller, 1902)
- Diversibipalium brauni (Mell, 1903)
- Diversibipalium brunneum (Whitehouse, 1919)
- Diversibipalium cantori (Wright, 1860)
- Diversibipalium catenatum (Graff, 1898)
- Diversibipalium claparedei (Graff, 1898)
- Diversibipalium claviforme (Loman, 1890)
- Diversibipalium delicatum (Whitehouse, 1914)
- Diversibipalium dendrophilum (Schmarda, 1859)
- Diversibipalium dihangense (Whitehouse, 1914)
- Diversibipalium engeli (Hartog, 1968)
- Diversibipalium expeditionis (Loman, 1895)
- Diversibipalium falcatum (Graff, 1899)
- Diversibipalium ferudpoorense (Wright, 1860)
- Diversibipalium flowei (Graff, 1899)
- Diversibipalium fuligineum (Geba, 1909)
- Diversibipalium fuscocephalum (Kaburaki, 1922)
- Diversibipalium gebai (Geba, 1909)
- Diversibipalium giganteum (Whitehouse, 1914)
- Diversibipalium grandidieri (Mell, 1903)
- Diversibipalium haasei (Graff, 1899)
- Diversibipalium hasseltii (Loman, 1890)
- Diversibipalium indicum (Whitehouse, 1919)
- Diversibipalium isabellinum (Geba, 1909)
- Diversibipalium jalorense (Laidlaw, 1903)
- Diversibipalium jansei (Muller, 1907)
- Diversibipalium keshavi (Saxena, 1957)
- Diversibipalium kirckpatricki (Graff, 1899)
- Diversibipalium koreense (Frieb, 1923)
- Diversibipalium kuhlii (Loman, 1890)
- Diversibipalium longitudinalis (de Beauchamp, 1933)
- Diversibipalium lunatum (Gray, 1831)
- Diversibipalium maculatum (Stimpson, 1857)
- Diversibipalium madagascarense (Graff, 1899)
- Diversibipalium marenzelleri (Mell, 1903)
- Diversibipalium mayottensis Justine, Gastineau, Gros, Gey, Ruzzier, Charles & Winsor, 2022
- Diversibipalium megacephalum (Müller, 1902)
- Diversibipalium molle (Graff, 1899)
- Diversibipalium multilineatum (Makino & Shirasawa, 1983)
- Diversibipalium murinum (Graff, 1899)
- Diversibipalium natunense (Meixner, 1906)
- Diversibipalium negritorum (Graff, 1899)
- Diversibipalium nigrilumbe (Loman, 1890)
- Diversibipalium olivaceps (Geba, 1909)
- Diversibipalium pictum (Geba, 1909)
- Diversibipalium quadricinctum (Loman, 1890)
- Diversibipalium rauchi (Graff, 1898)
- Diversibipalium richtersi (Graff, 1899)
- Diversibipalium ridleyi (Graff, 1899)
- Diversibipalium roonwali (Ramakrishna & Chauhan, 1962)
- Diversibipalium rotungense (Whitehouse, 1914)
- Diversibipalium salvini (Graff, 1899)
- Diversibipalium sarasini (Müller, 1907)
- Diversibipalium sexcinctum (Loman, 1890)
- Diversibipalium shipleyi (Graff, 1899)
- Diversibipalium solmsi (Graff, 1898)
- Diversibipalium sordidum (Whitehouse, 1914)
- Diversibipalium splendens (Whitehouse, 1919)
- Diversibipalium steindachneri (Graff, 1899)
- Diversibipalium stimpsoni (Diesing, 1862)
- Diversibipalium sumatrense (Loman, 1883)
- Diversibipalium superbum (Graff, 1899)
- Diversibipalium sylvestre (Whitehouse, 1919)
- Diversibipalium tamatavense (Graff, 1899)
- Diversibipalium tau (Mell, 1903)
- Diversibipalium tennenti (Diesing, 1862)
- Diversibipalium transversefasciatum (Müller, 1907)
- Diversibipalium tripartitum (Graff, 1899)
- Diversibipalium unicolor (Moseley, 1877)
- Diversibipalium vinosum (Kaburaki, 1925)
- Diversibipalium virchowi (Graff, 1899)
- Diversibipalium virgatum (Stimpson, 1857)
- Diversibipalium vittatum (Loman, 1888)
- Diversibipalium weberi (Loman, 1890)
- Diversibipalium whitehousei (Ogren & Kawakatsu, 1987)
- Diversibipalium wrighti (Graff, 1899)
