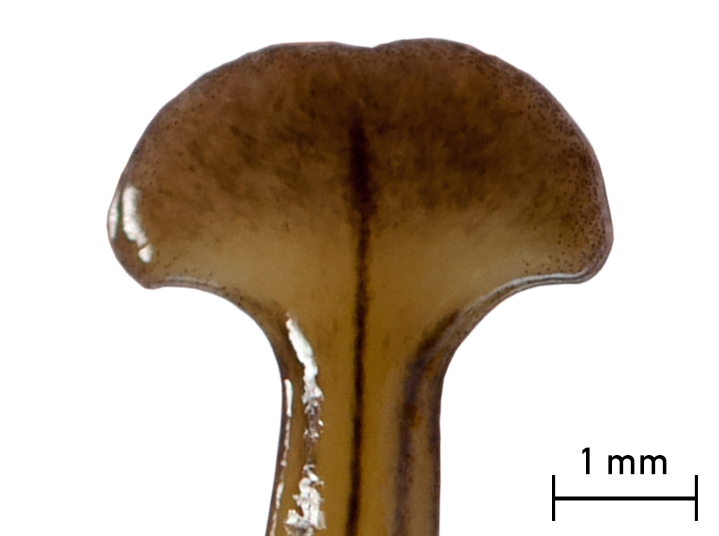
- Diversibipalium multilineatum, head

Scientific classification
- Kingdom: Animalia
- Phylum: Platyhelminthes
- Order: Tricladida
- Family: Geoplanidae
- Genus: Diversibipalium
- Species: D. multilineatum

Binomial name
- Diversibipalium multilineatum (Makino & Shirasawa, 1983)

Synonyms
- Bipalium multilineatum Makino & Shirasawa, 1983

= Diversibipalium multilineatum =

Species of flatworm

Diversibipalium multilineatum is a species of large predatory land flatworm.

The species is native to Japan. It has been recorded in 2016 for the first time outside Asia, from Bologna, Italy (from a finding in September 2014), and in several localities in France. More records in 2021 confirmed its presence in various regions of Italy and in 2025 in the Netherlands. It is thus an alien species to Europe.

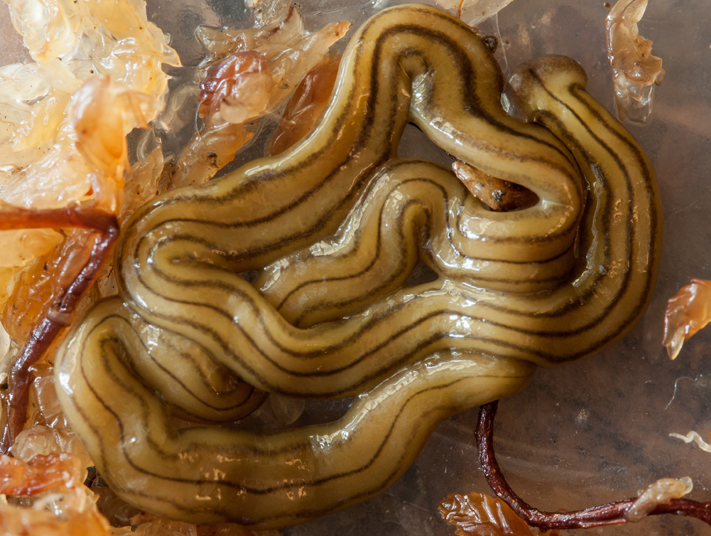
Diversibipalium multilineatum from Italy: Body with distinctive dorsal lines

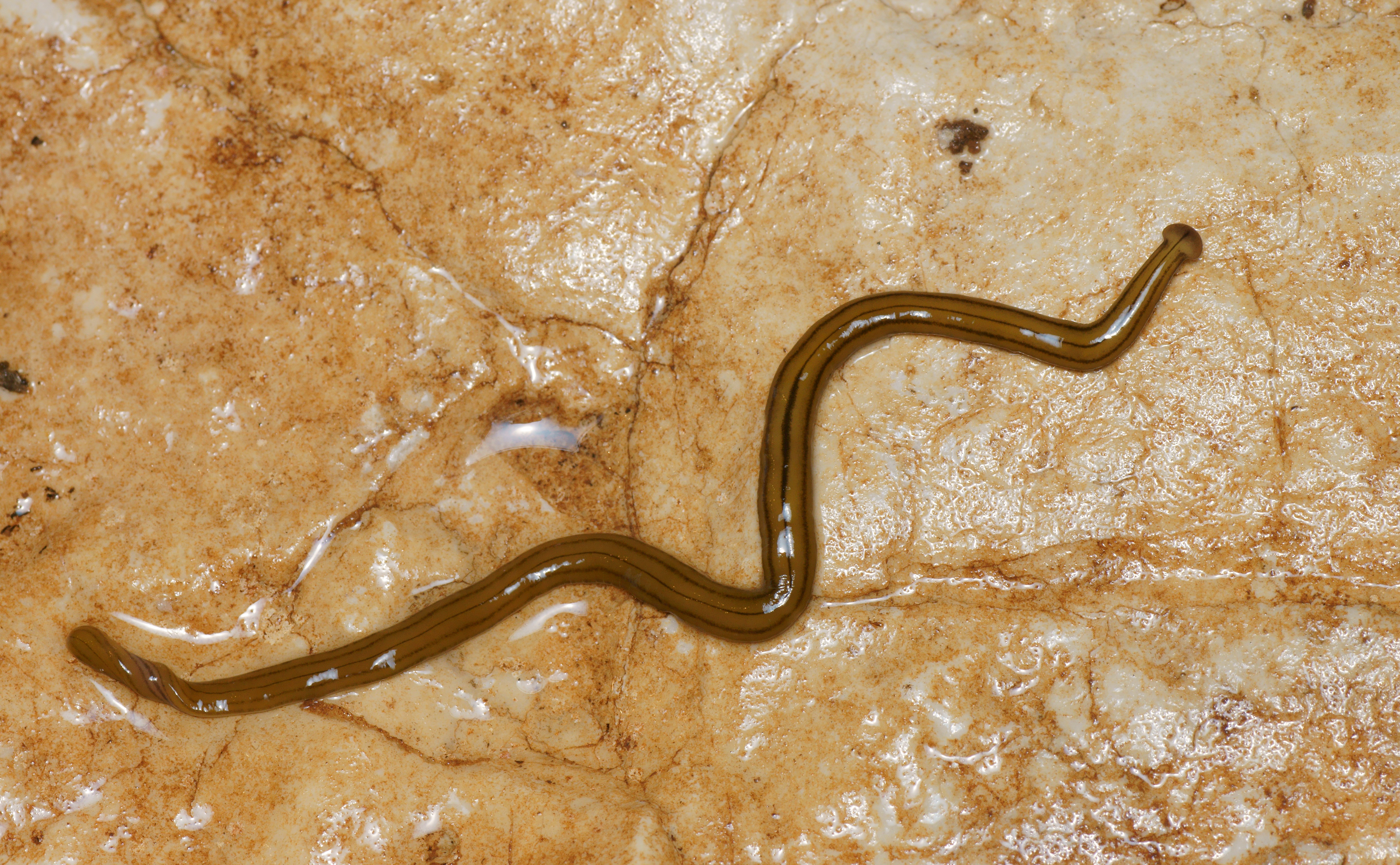
Diversibipalium multilineatum, body

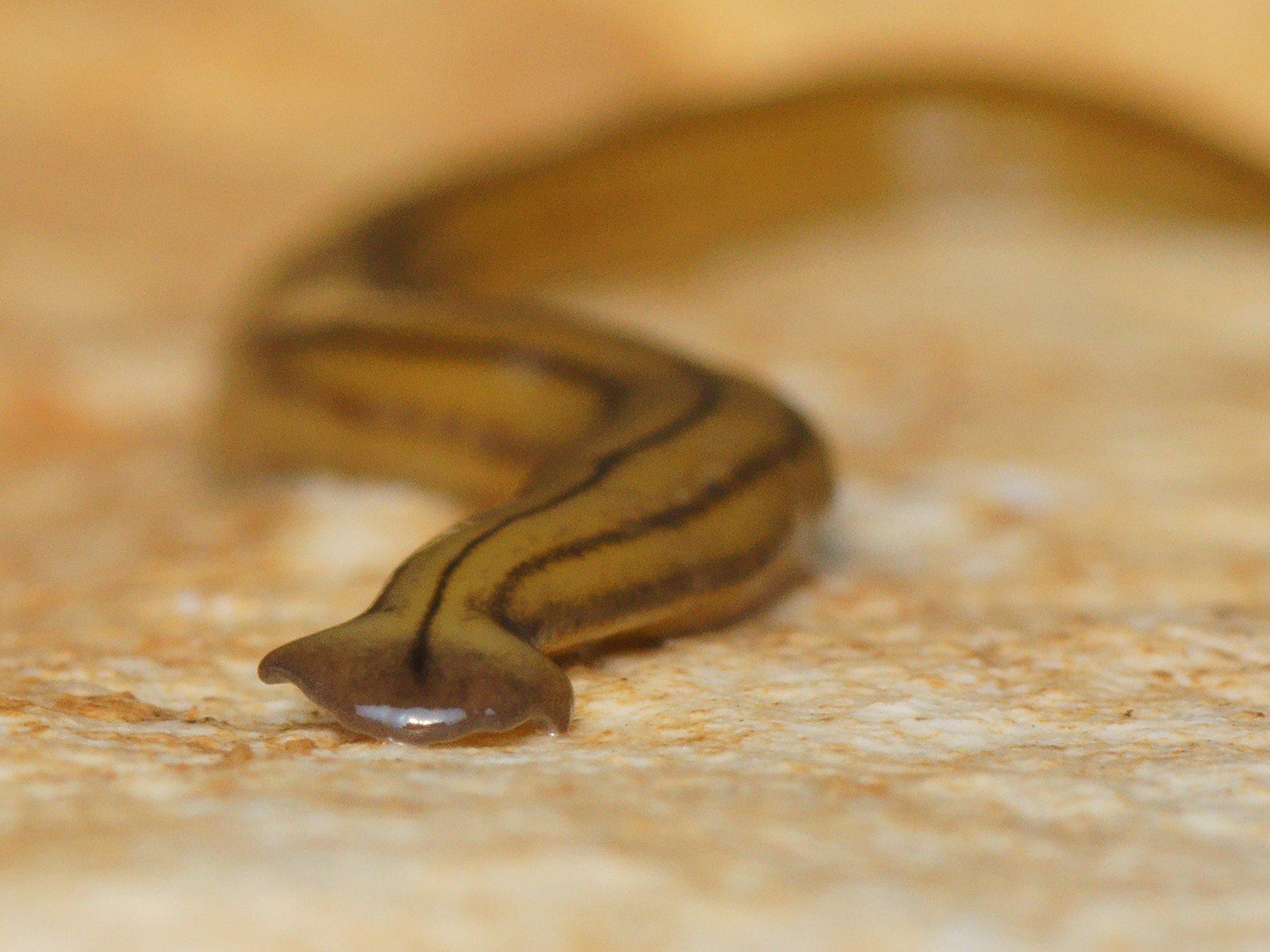
Diversibipalium multilineatum, head

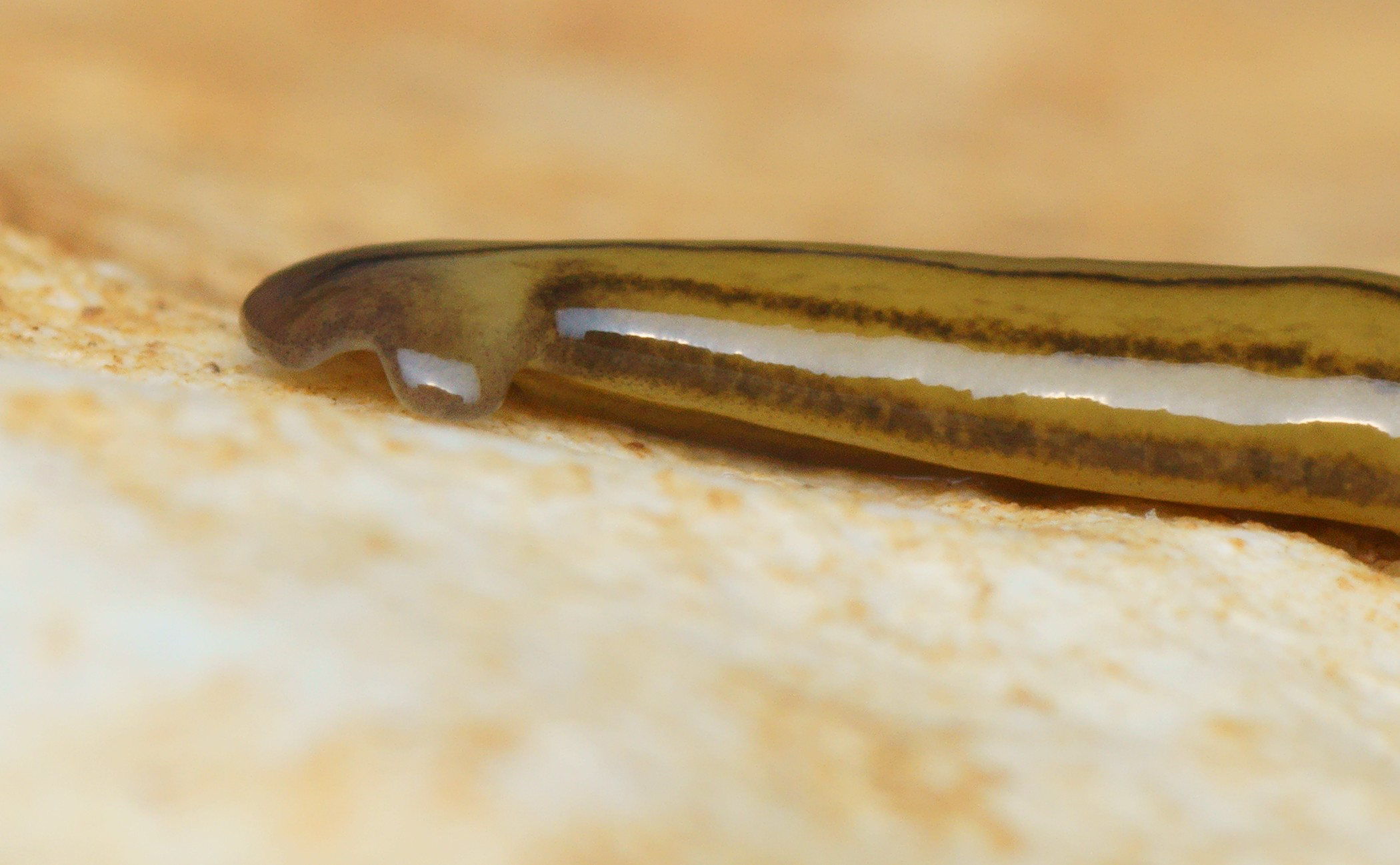
Diversibipalium multilineatum, head

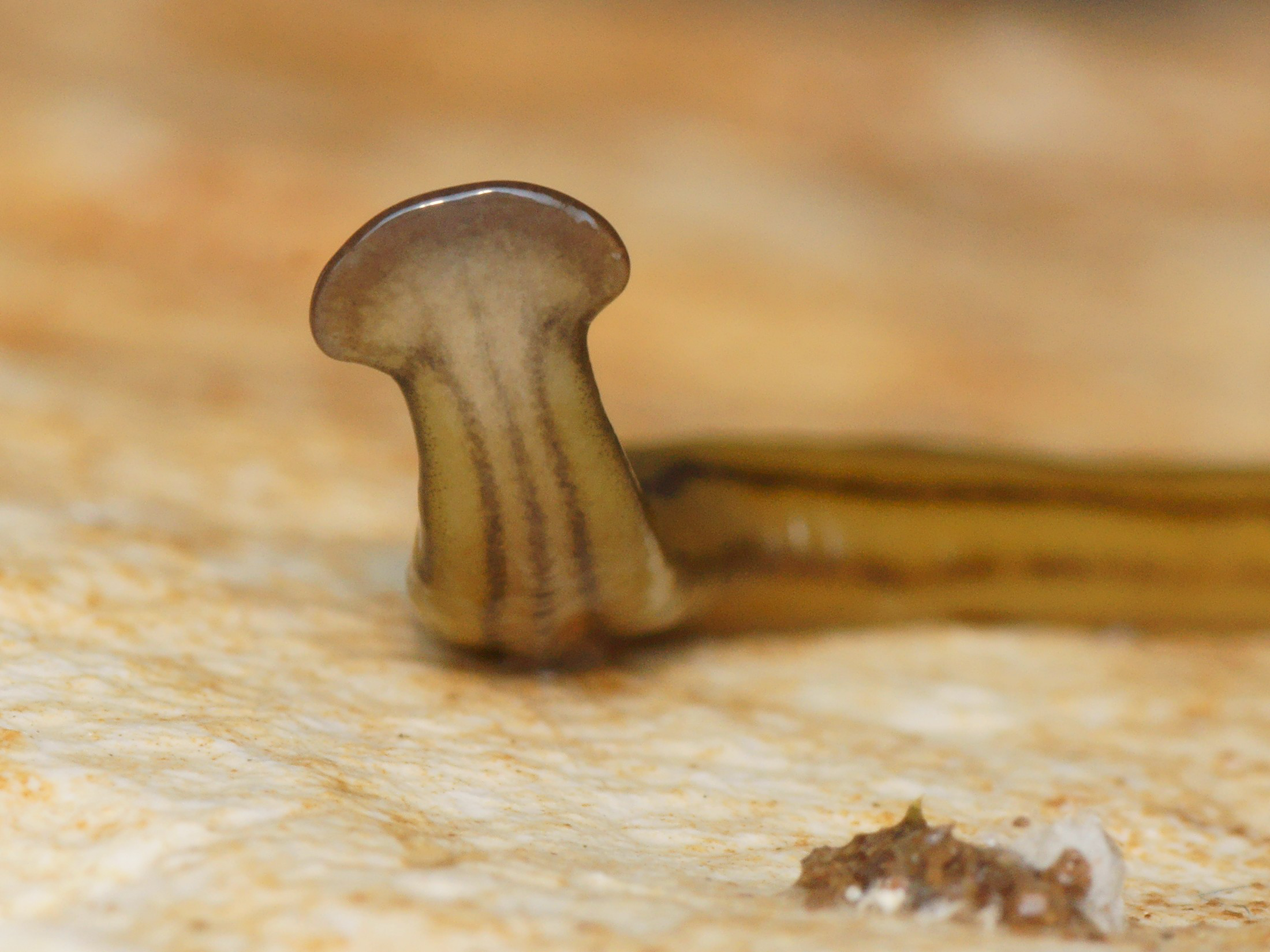
Diversibipalium multilineatum, head

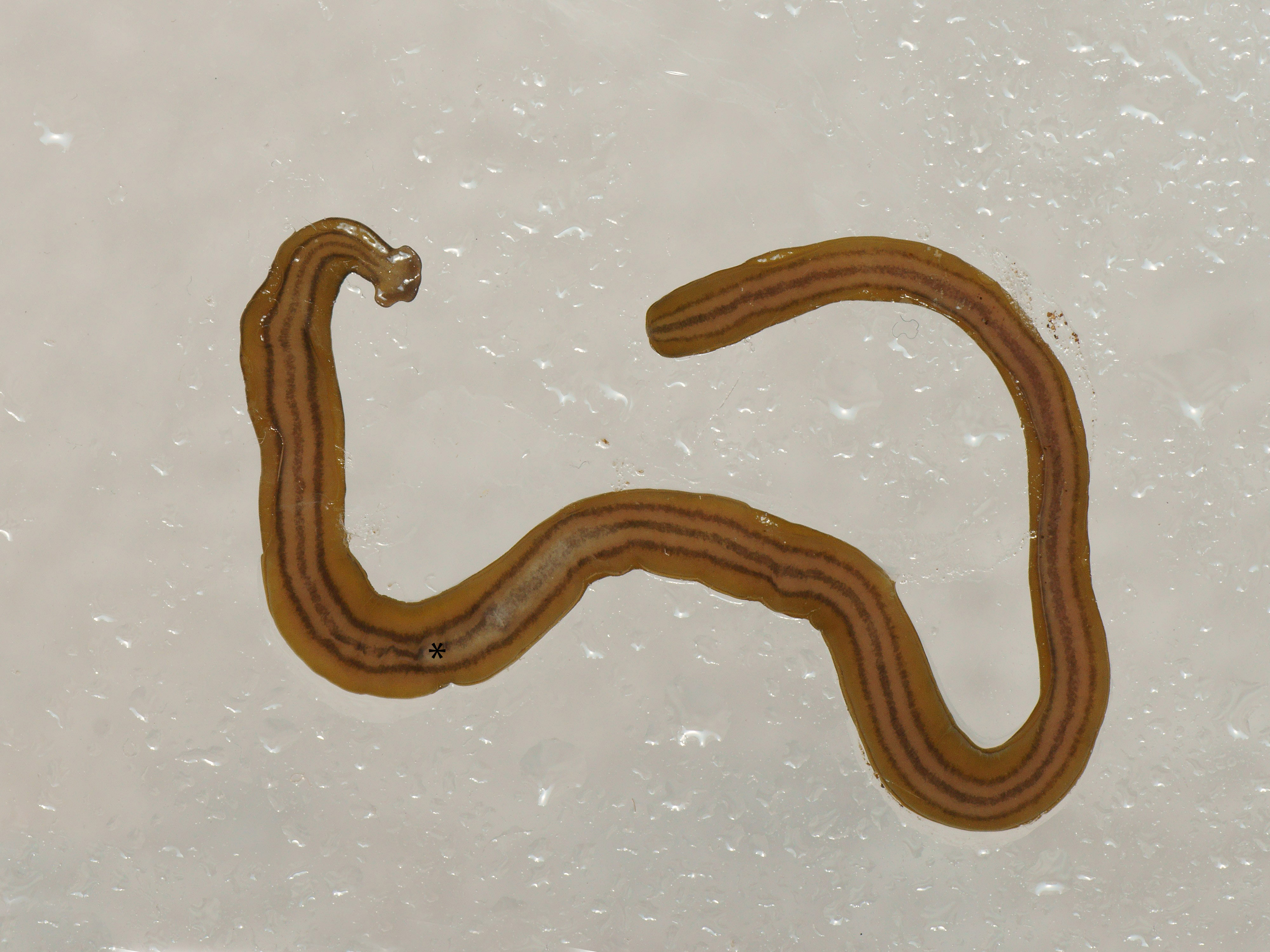
Diversibipalium multilineatum, body, ventral view
