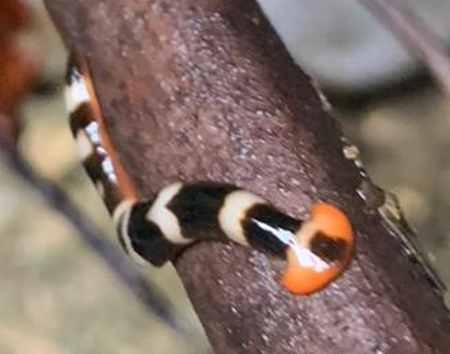

Scientific classification
- Kingdom: Animalia
- Phylum: Platyhelminthes
- Order: Tricladida
- Family: Geoplanidae
- Genus: Diversibipalium
- Species: D. rauchi

Binomial name
- Diversibipalium rauchi (Graff, 1898)

Synonyms
- Bipalium rauchi Graff, 1898

= Diversibipalium rauchi =

Species of flatworm

Diversibipalium rauchi is a species of land planarian within the family Geoplanidae. The species is native to Singapore on its main island Pulau Ujong. A number have also been found occurring in Florida, however it is unknown if there is an established population or is simply frequently introduced. The species is ornately patterned with broad black and white bands running throughout its body, ending in a red-orange lunate-shaped head.
