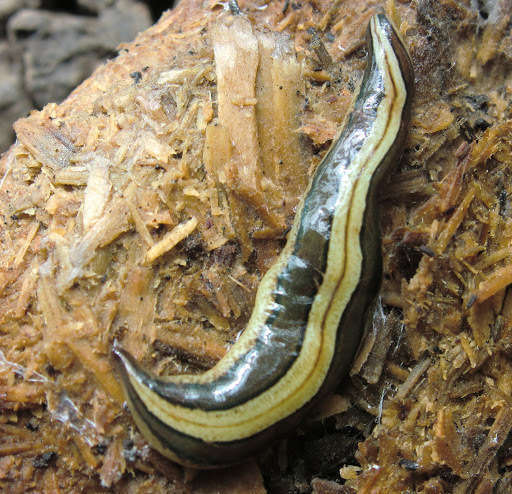
- Lenkunya adae

Scientific classification
- Kingdom: Animalia
- Phylum: Platyhelminthes
- Order: Tricladida
- Family: Geoplanidae
- Subfamily: Rhynchodeminae
- Tribe: Caenoplanini
- Genus: Lenkunya; Winsor, 1991

Type species
- Geoplana munda Fletcher & Hamilton, 1888

= Lenkunya =

Genus of flatworms

Lenkunya is a genus of land planarians from Australia.

== Description ==
Species of the genus Lenkunya are characterized by having body that is broadly convex dorsally and flat ventrally. The creeping sole occupies 70–80% of the body width. The eyes form a single row around the anterior tip, are crowded antero-laterally and continue posteriorly in a staggered row. The parenchymal musculature is strong and includes a ring zone of circulo-oblique fibers. The copulatory apparatus has a well-developed penis papilla and lacks adenodactyls or other accessory glands.

== Etymology ==
The name Lenkunya comes from an aboriginal word meaning beautiful.

== Species ==
The genus Lenkunya includes the following species:

- Lenkunya adae (Dendy, 1891)
- Lenkunya arenicola (Steel, 1901)
- Lenkunya frosti (Spencer, 1891)
- Lenkunya ornata (Fletcher & Hamilton, 1888)
- Lenkunya virgata (Fletcher & Hamilton, 1888)
