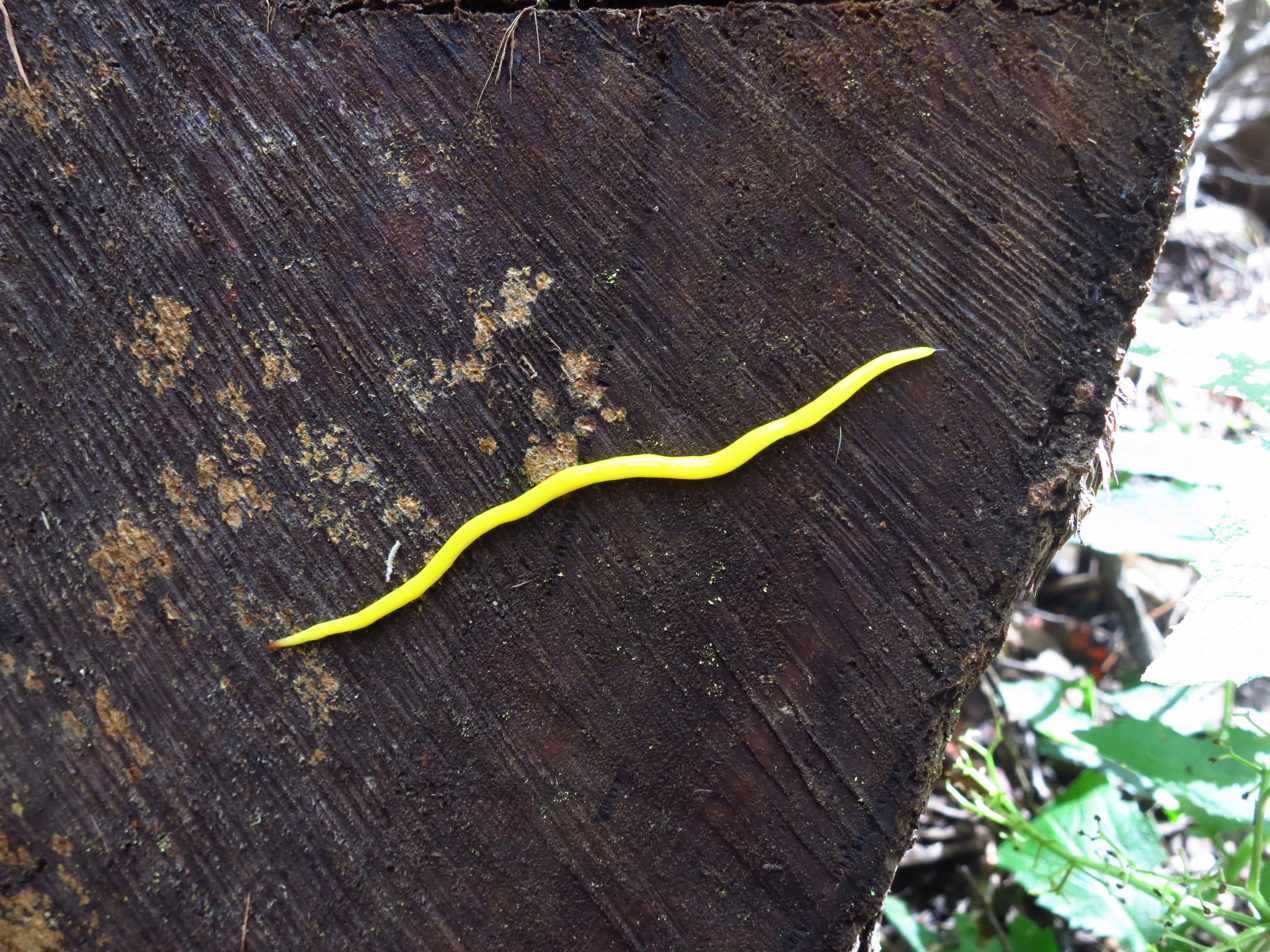
- Fletchamia sugdeni

Scientific classification
- Kingdom: Animalia
- Phylum: Platyhelminthes
- Order: Tricladida
- Family: Geoplanidae
- Tribe: Caenoplanini
- Genus: Fletchamia; Winsor, 1991

Type species
- Geoplana quinquelineata J. J. Fletcher & A. G. Hamilton, 1888

= Fletchamia =

Genus of flatworms

Fletchamia is a genus of land planarians from Australia.

== Description ==
The genus Fletchamia is characterized by having an elongate and subcylindrical body with a creeping sole that occupies from 50 to 70% of the body with. The eyes form a single row around the anterior tip, are crowded antero-laterally and continue posteriorly in two to three staggered rows. The parenchymal musculature is weak and includes a loose ring zone of circulo-oblique fibers and a weak ventral plate of longitudinal fibers. The copulatory apparatus lacks a permanent penis, but some species may have a rudimentary penis papilla. The female atrium communicates posteriorly with a diverticulum.

== Etymology ==
The name Fletchamia is a portmanteau of the surnames of Joseph James Fletcher (Fletc-) and Alexander Greenlaw Hamilton (-hami-) and commemorates their contributions to the knowledge of Australian land planarians.

== Species ==
The genus Fletchamia includes the following species:

- Fletchamia dakini (Dendy, 1915)
- Fletchamia flavilineata (Dendy, 1915)
- Fletchamia fuscodorsalis (Steel, 1901)
- Fletchamia mediolineata (Dendy, 1891)
- Fletchamia mmahoni (Dendy, 1891)
- Fletchamia quinquelineata (J. J. Fletcher & A. G. Hamilton, 1888)
- Fletchamia sugdeni (Dendy, 1891)
