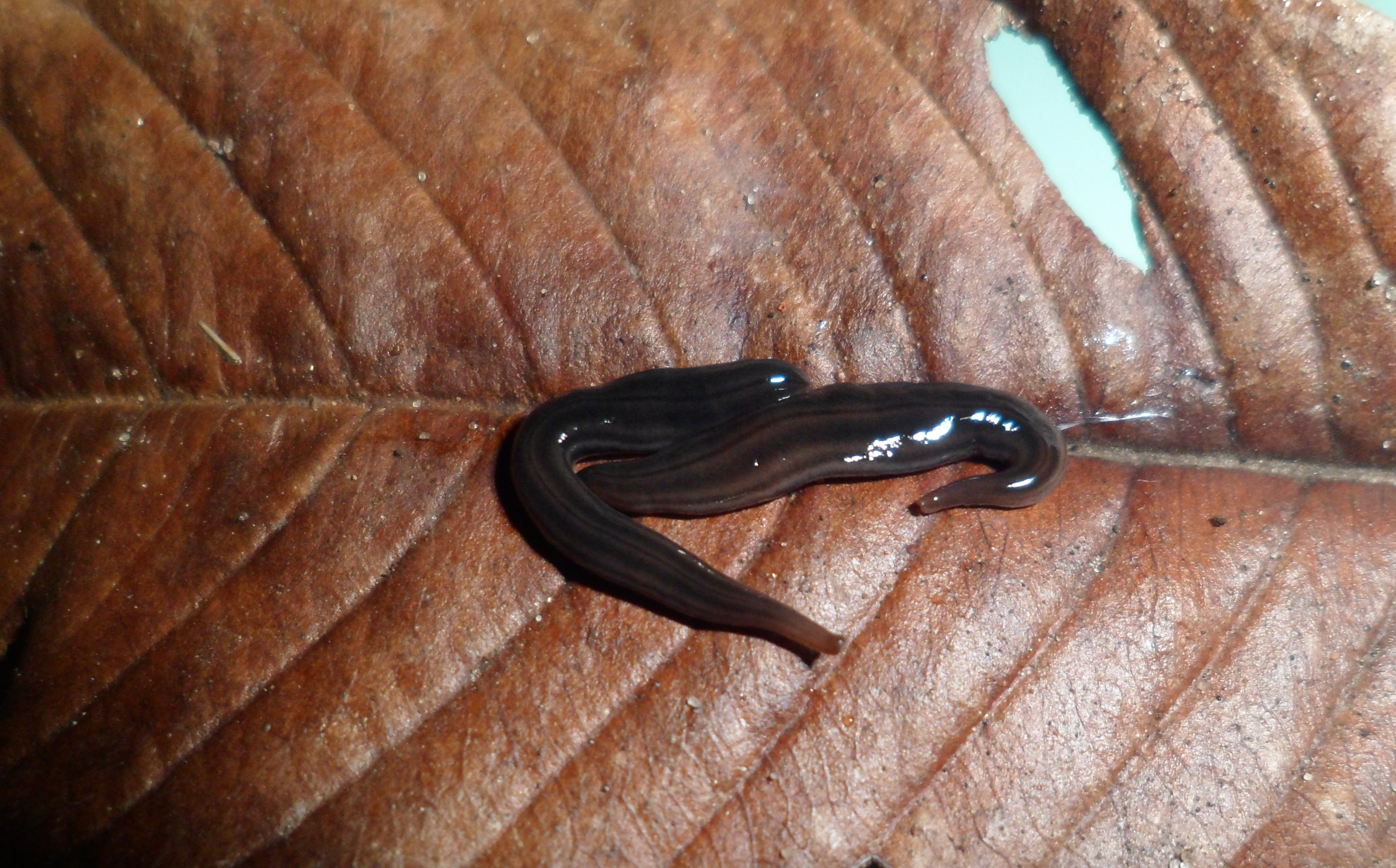

Scientific classification
- Kingdom: Animalia
- Phylum: Platyhelminthes
- Order: Tricladida
- Family: Geoplanidae
- Tribe: Caenoplanini
- Genus: Endeavouria; Ogren & Kawakatsu, 1991
- Species: E. septemlineata

Binomial name
- Endeavouria septemlineata (Hyman, 1939)
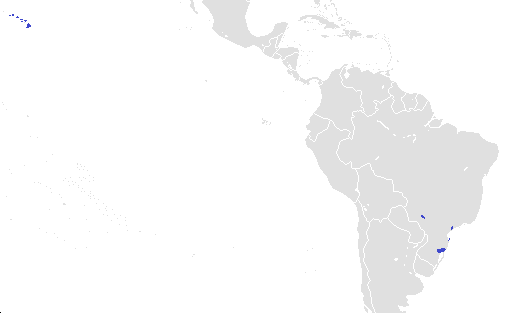
- Known distribution in dark blue

Synonyms
- (Species): Geoplana septemlineata Hyman, 1939

= Endeavouria =

Endeavouria septemlineata

Genus of flatworms

Endeavouria is a monotypic genus of land planarians from the Pacific region. It contains a single species, Endeavouria septemlineata.

== Description ==
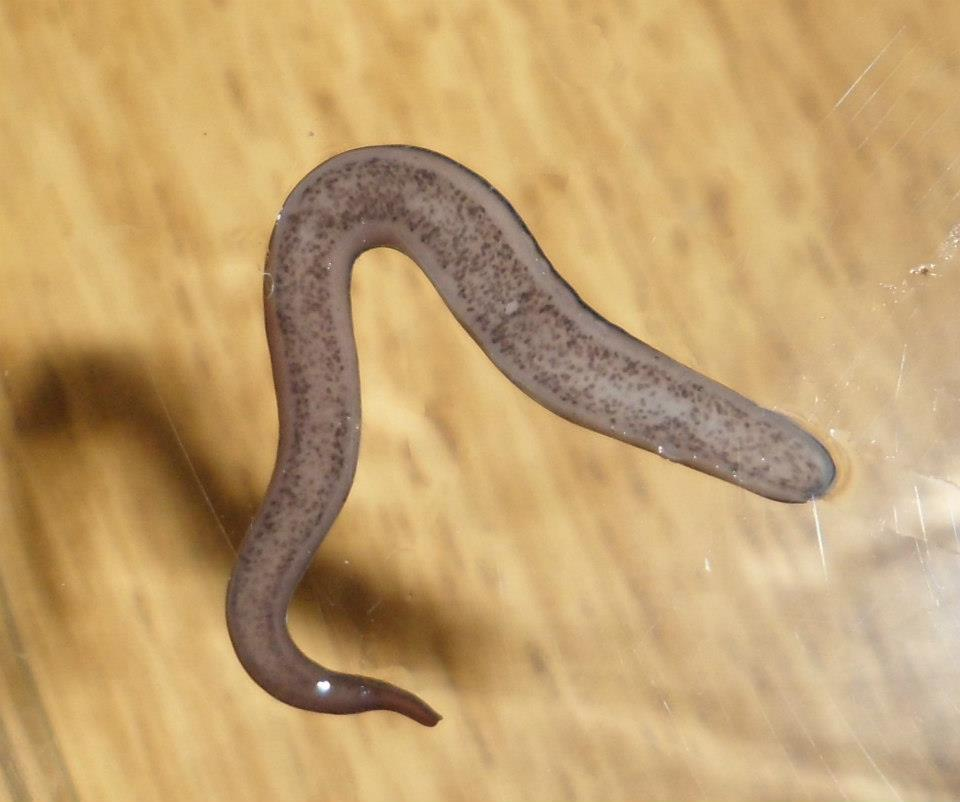
Ventral view of Endeavouria septemlineata

The genus Endeavouria is similar to other closely related genera, such as Caenoplana and Kontikia, but can be differentiated by the narrower creeping sole and a thick layer of longitudinal muscle fibers beneath the ventral nerve plate.

Endeavouria septemlineata is a small land planarian, reaching about 30 millimetres (1.2 in) in length. The dorsal side may appear completely black at first sight, but a closer look reveals that it has a light-brown background. There are seven dark longitudinal stripes running along the body: one narrow dark-brown stripe, two lateral broad black stripes with diffuse margins, two paramarginal stripes and two marginal stripes. The dorsal color is visible between the median and lateral stripes and between the lateral and paramarginal stripes. The ventral side and the region between the paramarginal and marginal stripes is pale grey. The creeping sole is marked by numerous small dark spots.

The several eyes are arranged in a single row along the body margins, being located over the marginal stripes. They are closer to each other in the anterior region and posteriorly they gradually become more spaced.

The copulatory apparatus of E. septemlineata has a big ventral fold and a small intra-antral penis papilla.

== Etymology ==
The name Endeavouria honors the flagship HMS Endeavour commanded by James Cook in his first voyage of discovery to Australia and New Zealand. The specific epithet septemlineata (Latin for "seven-striped") refers to the seven dark longitudinal stripes on the dorsum.

== Origin and Distribution ==
The native place of Endeavouria septemlineata is still unknown. It was first found in Hawaii and later in several locations in Brazil. As all land planarians in the tribe Caenoplanini, it is most likely originally from somewhere in the Pacific region.

In 2018, the species was recorded from Tahiti, French Polynesia, on the base of a single specimen. The identification was confirmed by examination of external and internal anatomy and DNA barcoding.

In 2021, the species was found in Italy - that was its first record for Europe.

== Ecology and behavior ==
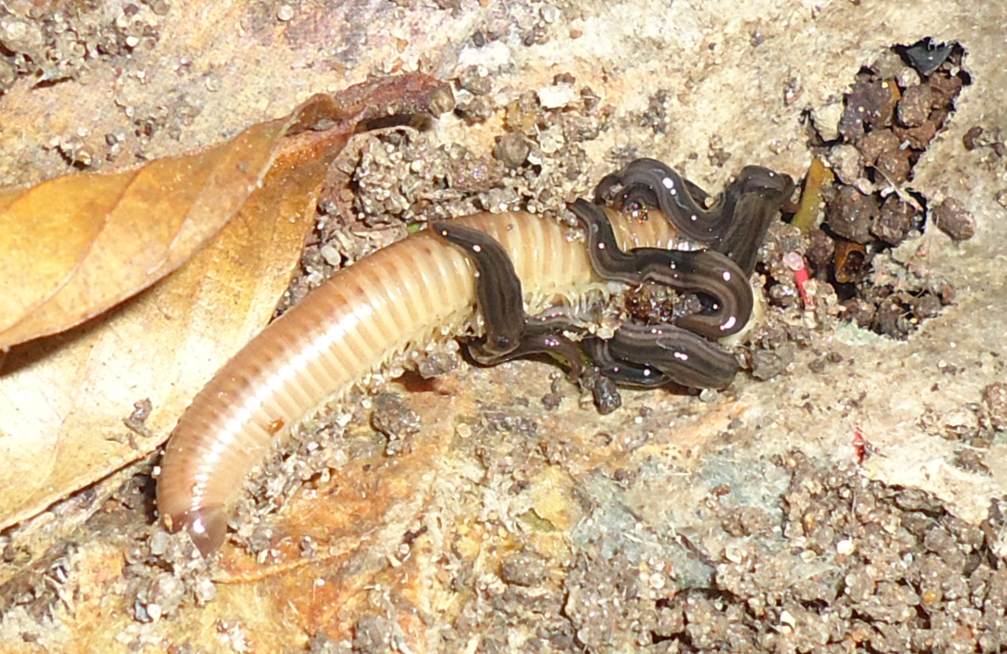
Endeavouria septemlineata feeding on Rhinocricus millipede

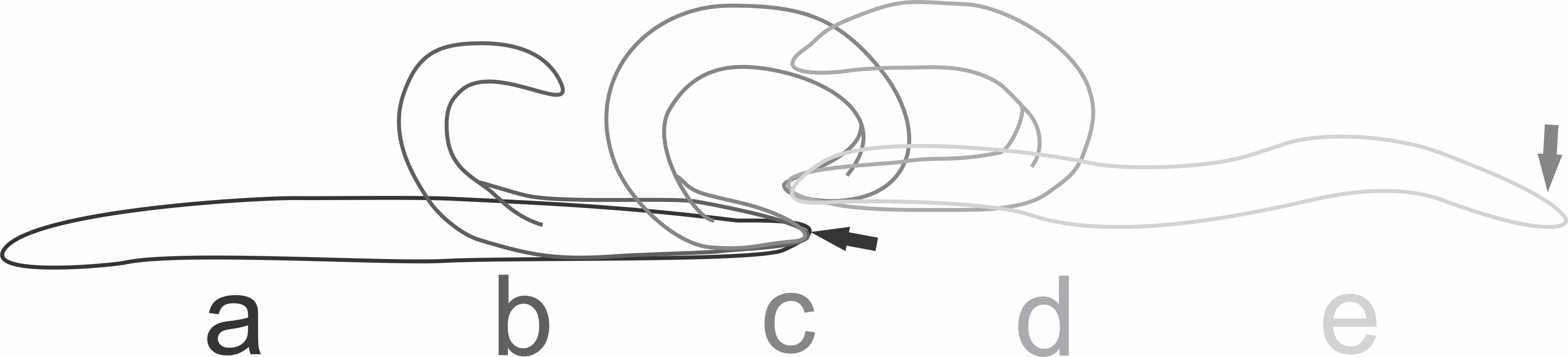
Tumbling behavior of Endeavouria septemlineata

Specimens of E. septemlineata show a gregarious behavior, gathering in groups of tens of individuals that remain hidden in the leaf litter and under rocks or fallen logs during the day. They feed on several invertebrate groups, such as arthropods and mollusks, which they may hunt, but most of the time they feed on dead animals, thus being mainly scavengers.

It has been demonstrated that in Brazil several native land planarians feed on the introduced E. septemlineata, thus possibly controlling its spread as an invasive species.

When attacked by a predator, individuals of E. septemlineata quickly move away. The most frequent strategy to escape is by tumbling, a behavior where the planarian lifts its posterior end and bends it forward until it touches the substrate ahead of the anterior end. If part of the body is trapped by the predator, it may escape by performing autotomy.
