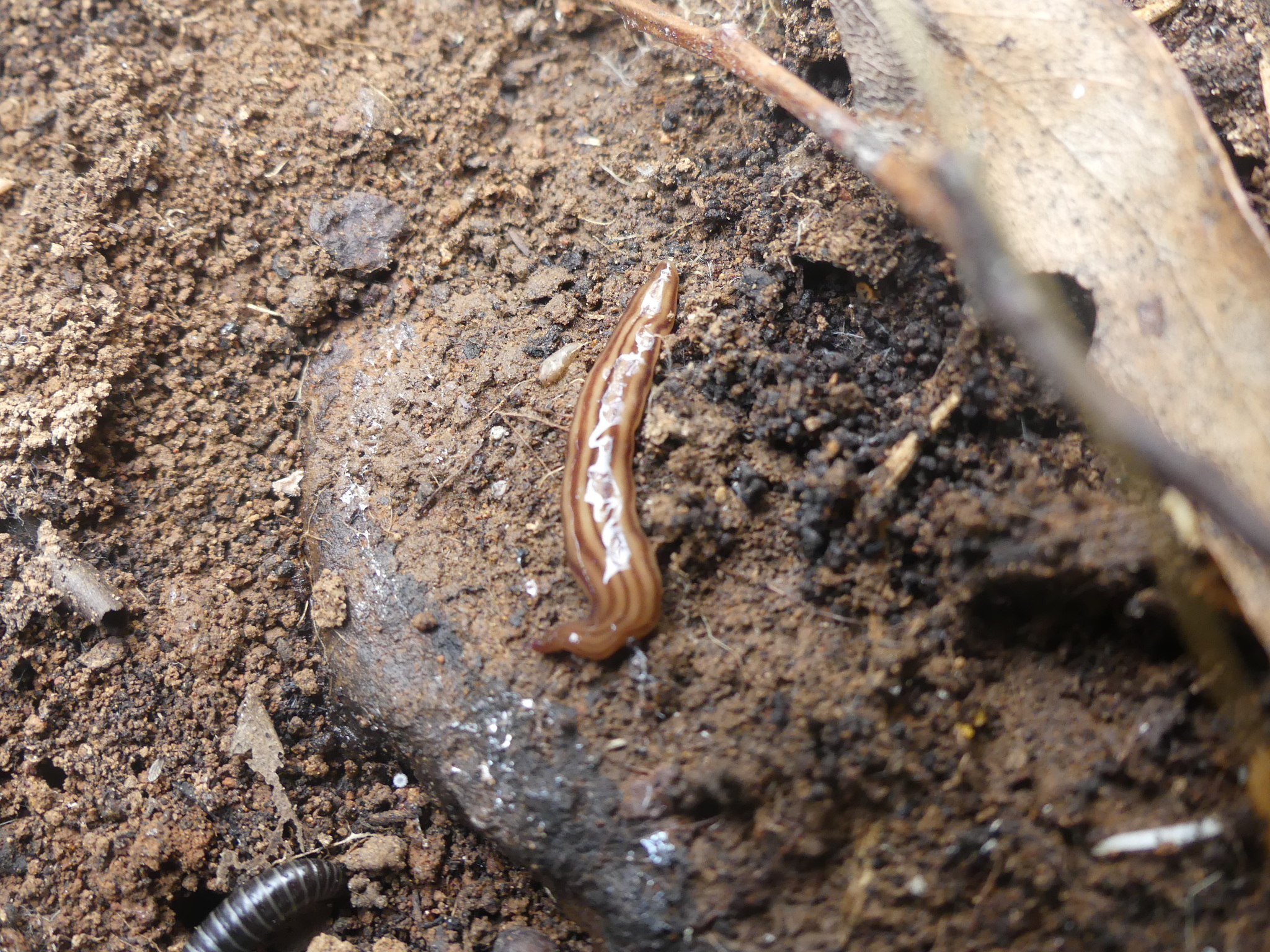
- Tasmanoplana tasmaniana

Scientific classification
- Kingdom: Animalia
- Phylum: Platyhelminthes
- Order: Tricladida
- Family: Geoplanidae
- Tribe: Caenoplanini
- Genus: Tasmanoplana; Winsor, 1991

Type species
- Planaria tasmaniana Darwin, 1844

= Tasmanoplana =

Genus of flatworms

Tasmanoplana is a genus of land planarians from Australia.

== Description ==
Species of the genus Tasmanoplana are characterized by having an elongate, subcylindrical body that is flat ventrally. The creeping sole occupies more than two thirds of the body width. The eyes are small and arranged along the body margins in a single row from the anterior to the posterior end. The parenchymal musculature includes very strong and compact longitudinal fibers forming a ring around the intestine. The copulatory apparatus has a small penis papilla and a diverticulum ventral to the female atrium that opens into the copulatory canal.

== Etymology ==
The word Tasmanoplana is a combination of Tasmania, the island from which Charles Darwin collected the first specimen of the genus, and Latin plana, flat.

== Species ==
The genus Tasmoplana includes the following species:

- Tasmanoplana balfouri (von Graff, 1899)
- Tasmanoplana comitatis (Dendy, 1915)
- Tasmanoplana tasmaniana (Darwin, 1844)
