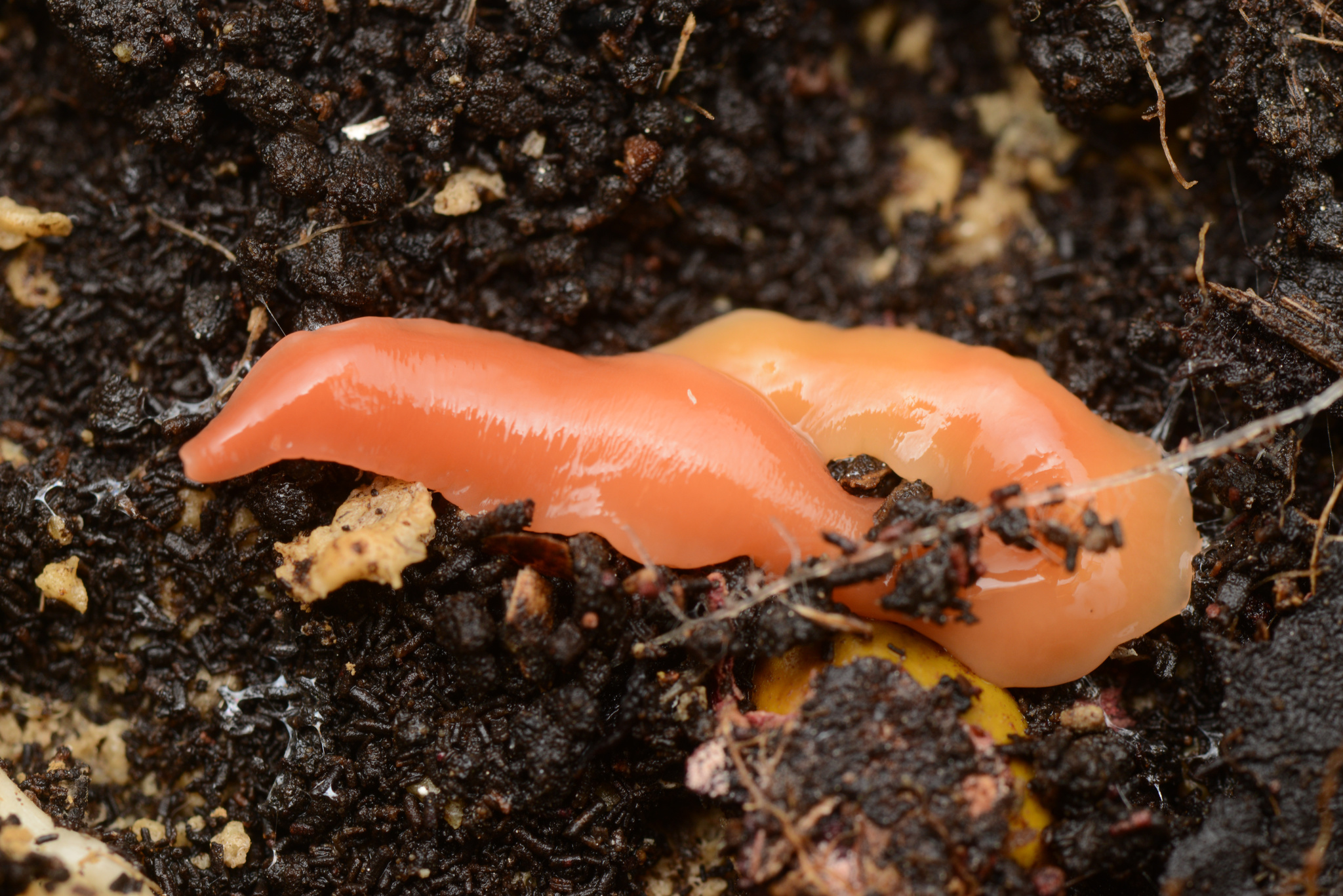
- Australoplana sanguinea

Scientific classification
- Kingdom: Animalia
- Phylum: Platyhelminthes
- Order: Tricladida
- Family: Geoplanidae
- Tribe: Caenoplanini
- Genus: Australoplana; Winsor, 1991

Type species
- Caenoplana sanguinea Moseley, 1877

= Australoplana =

Genus of flatworms

Australoplana also known as Australian flatworm is a genus of land planarians from Australia and New Zealand.

== Description ==
The genus Australoplana is characterized by having an elongated, strap-like body that is broadly convex dorsally and flat ventrally. The creeping sole occupies less than 25% of the body with. The eyes are absent or minute and arranged along the body margins in a single row from the anterior to the posterior end. The parenchymal longitudinal musculature is very weak or absent. The copulatory apparatus has an intra-antral penis papilla in some species and the ovovitelline ducts enter the female atrium ventrally.

== Invasive species ==
Australoplana sanguinea is an invasive alien species in England and Wales where it predates on earthworms.

== Etymology ==
The name Australoplana comes from Latin australis, southern + plana, flat.

== Species ==
The genus Australoplana includes the following species:

- Australoplana alba
- Australoplana minor (Dendy, 1892)
- Australoplana rubicunda (Fletcher & Hamilton, 1888)
- Australoplana sanguinea (Moseley, 1877)
- Australoplana typhlops (Dendy, 1894)
