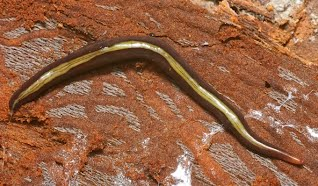

Scientific classification
- Kingdom: Animalia
- Phylum: Platyhelminthes
- Order: Tricladida
- Family: Geoplanidae
- Genus: Caenoplana
- Species: C. variegata

Binomial name
- Caenoplana variegata (Fletcher & Hamilton, 1888)

Synonyms
- Geoplana variegata Fletcher & Hamilton,1888; Australopacifica variegata (Fletcher & Hamilton,1888); Australopacifica bicolor (Graff, 1899); Caenoplana bicolor (Graff, 1899); Geoplana bicolor Graff, 1899

= Caenoplana variegata =

Species of flatworm

Caenoplana variegata is a species of land planarian. It was first described in 1888 as Geoplana variegata by Joseph James Fletcher and Alexander Greenlaw Hamilton. The currently accepted name is Caenoplana variegata although the name accepted by Australian authorities is Australopacifica variegata.

The type locality is somewhere in the County of Cumberland, New South Wales.

Caenoplana variegata is considered an invasive species in the UK and Europe. It was first discovered in the UK in 2008. The species spread to the Netherlands in 2014 and likely continued spreading from there to Germany and Austria, with first local sightings of individuals reported in September 2023 and February 2024 respectively.

Spread of the flatworms might be facilitated by domestic cats and dogs.
