= Artioposthia diemenensis =

Scientific classification
- Kingdom: Animalia
- Phylum: Platyhelminthes
- Order: Tricladida
- Family: Geoplanidae
- Genus: Artioposthia
- Species: A. diemenensis

Binomial name
- Artioposthia diemenensis (Dendy, 1894)

Synonyms
- Geoplana diemenensis Dendy, 1894

Species of planarian

Artioposthia diemenensis, also known as Van Diemen's flatworm, is a species of land planarian in the tribe Caenoplanini. It has been found in southern Australia, including Tasmania.

== Description ==
Artioposthia diemenensis is generally flat and broad, sloping inwards at its ends. When crawling, it can reach up to 70 mm in length and 6 mm in width. The backside is a sepia brown color with some darker stripes running down; the entire backside is covered in whitish speckles. The underside is a whitish color.
