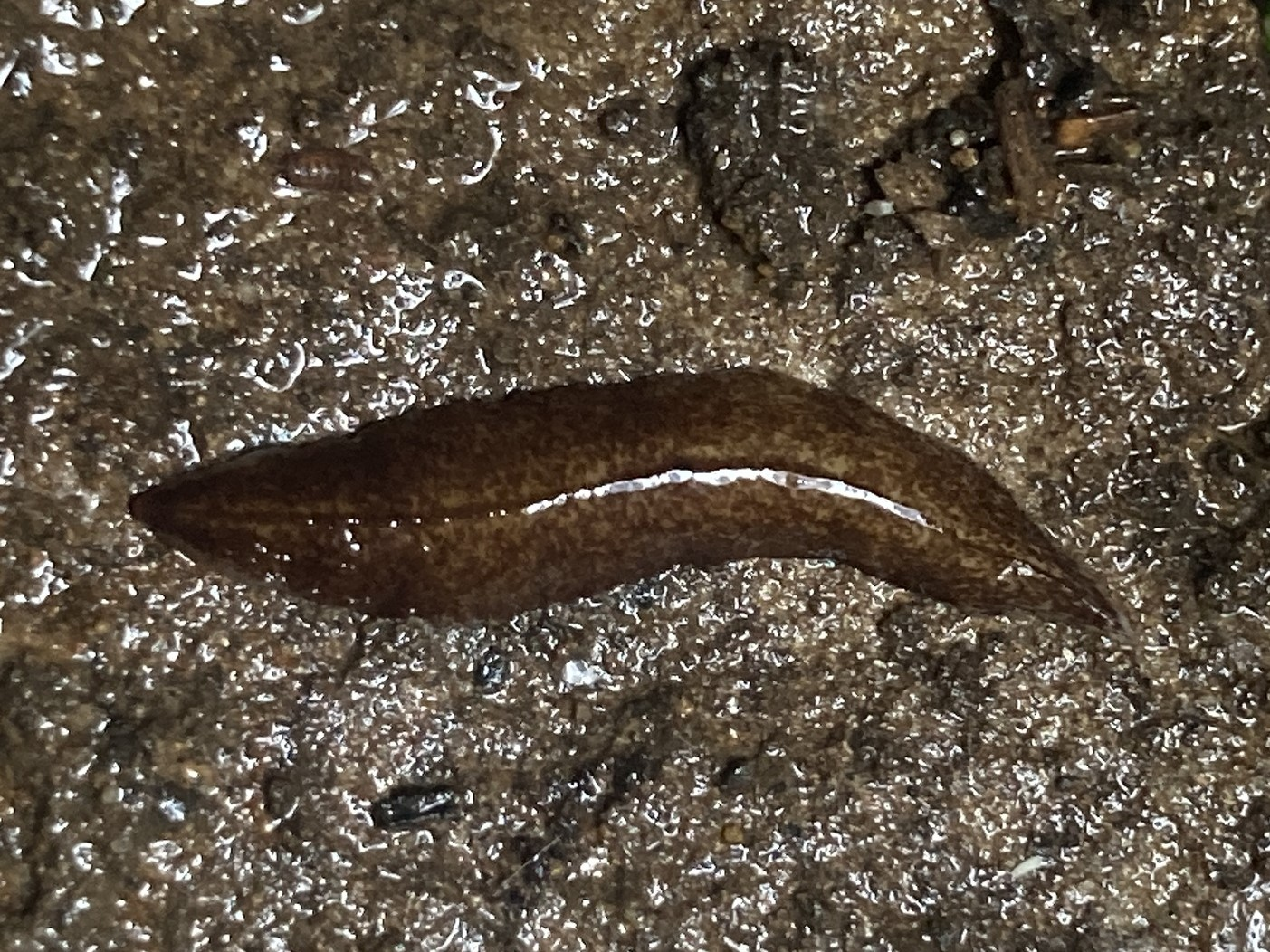
- Reomkago quadrangulatus

Scientific classification
- Kingdom: Animalia
- Phylum: Platyhelminthes
- Order: Tricladida
- Family: Geoplanidae
- Tribe: Caenoplanini
- Genus: Reomkago; Winsor, 1991

Type species
- Geoplana quadrangulata Dendy, 1891

= Reomkago =

Genus of flatworms

Reomkago is a genus of land planarians from Australia.

== Description ==
The genus Reomkago is characterized by having an elongate body that is quadrangular in cross section, the dorsal and ventral surfaces being flat and lateral surfaces sloping inwards. The creeping sole occupies less than 50% of the body with. The eyes are small and arranged along the body margins in a single row from the anterior to the posterior end. The parenchymal musculature includes weak longitudinal muscles generally restricted to a ventral plate and very strong dorso-ventral muscles that give the planarian its quadrangular shape. The copulatory apparatus has a penis papilla and lacks adenodactyls or other accessory glands.

== Etymology ==
The name Reomkago is a combination of the initials of Robert E. Ogren (REO) and Masaharu Kawakatsu (MK) with the sufix -ago, from Greek ἄγω, to guide. The genus honors the two scientists for their work in indexing the species of land planarians.

== Species ==
The genus Reomkago includes the following species:

- Reomkago flynni (Dendy, 1915)
- Reomkago quadrangulatus (Dendy, 1891)
- Reomkago ventropunctatus (Dendy, 1892)
- Reomkago wellingtoni (Dendy, 1892)
