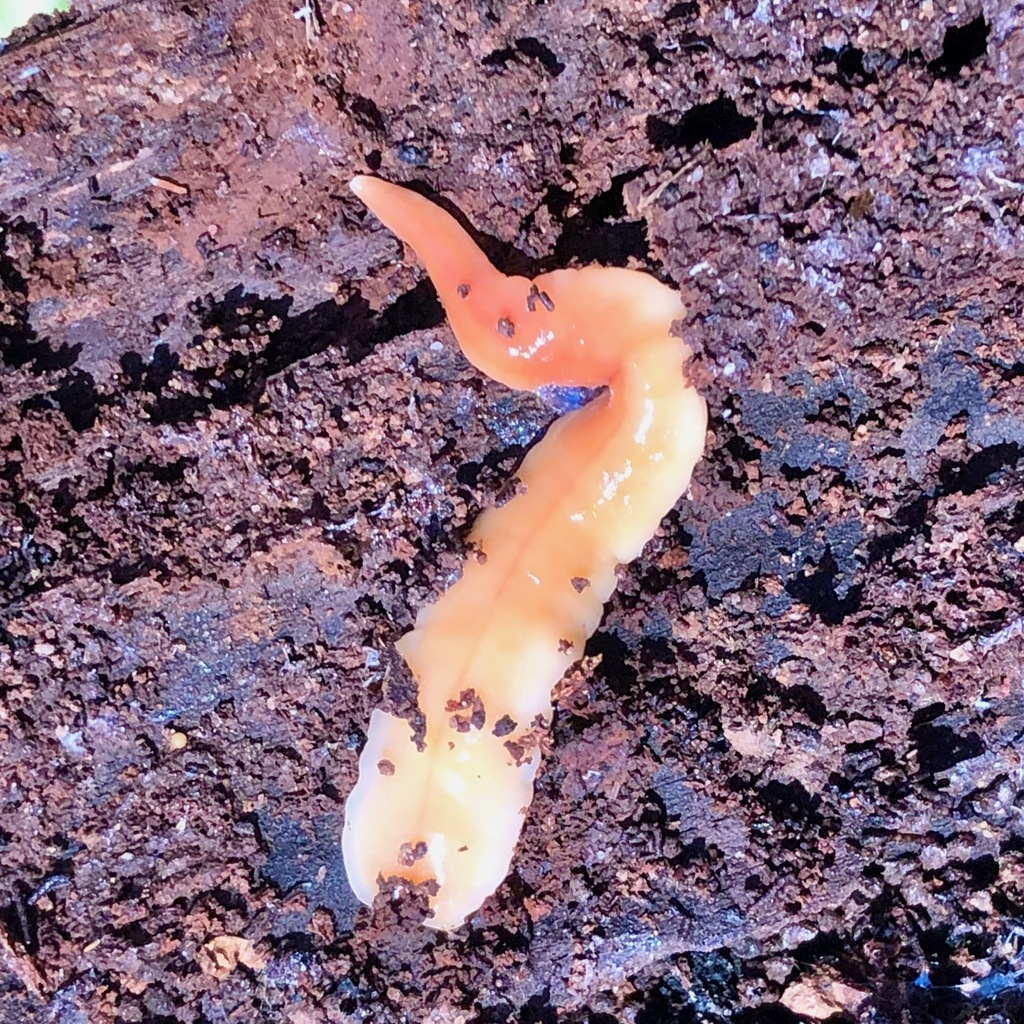

Scientific classification
- Kingdom: Animalia
- Phylum: Platyhelminthes
- Order: Tricladida
- Family: Geoplanidae
- Genus: Australoplana
- Species: A. alba

Binomial name
- Australoplana alba (Dendy, 1891)

Synonyms
- Caenoplana alba (Dendy, 1891); Geoplana alba Dendy, 1890

= Australoplana alba =

Species of flatworm

Australoplana alba, also known as the Australian flatworm, is a species of land planarian belonging to the tribe Caenoplanini. It is native to Australia.

== Taxonomy ==
Australoplana alba contains the following subspecies:

- Australoplana alba roseolineata
- Australoplana alba alba
