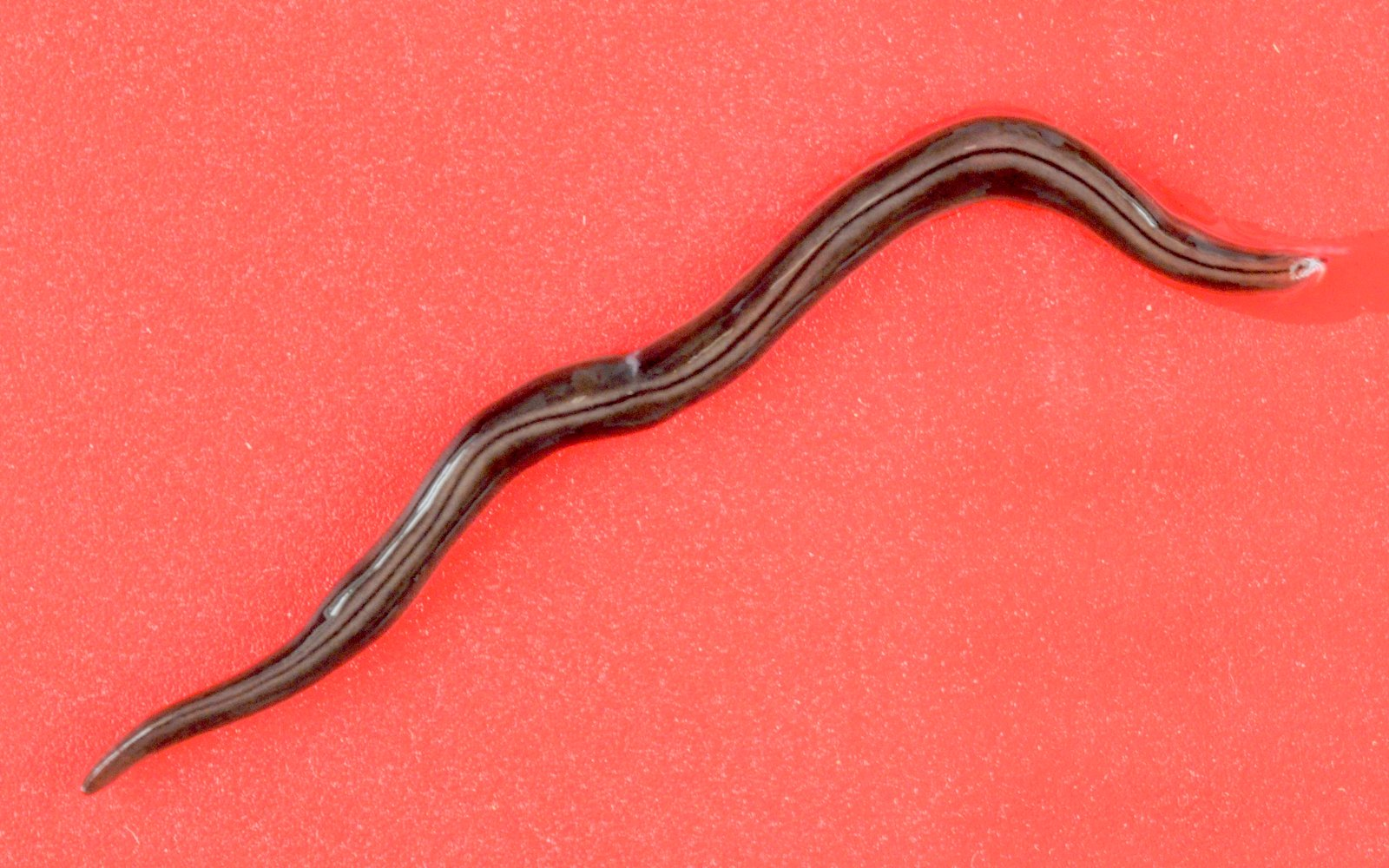
- Kontikia ventrolineata

Scientific classification
- Kingdom: Animalia
- Phylum: Platyhelminthes
- Order: Tricladida
- Family: Geoplanidae
- Tribe: Caenoplanini
- Genus: Kontikia; Froehlich, 1955

Type species
- Kontikia orana Froehlich, 1955

Synonyms
- Parakontikia Winsor, 1991; Coenoplana Moseley, 1877

= Kontikia =

Genus of flatworms

Kontikia is a genus of land planarians native from islands in the Indo-Pacific region, but several species have been introduced elsewhere.

== Description ==
The genus Kontikia includes planarians of elongate body, with a creeping sole that occupies one to two thirds of the body width. The mesenchymal musculature includes well-developed longitudinal muscles forming a ring zone around the intestine. The copulatory apparatus may or may not have a distinct penis papilla, depending on the degree of contraction of the reproductive structures. This led to an initial classification of specimens without a distinct penis papilla in another genus, Parakontikia.

== Genetics ==
The complete mitochondrial genome of Kontikia ventrolineata (= Parakontikia ventrolineata) was described in 2020. It displays common unusual characteristics shared with Platydemus manokwari, such as its colinearity, an overlap between ND4L and ND4 genes and an unusually long cox2 gene.

== Species ==
The genus Kontikia includes the following species:

- Kontikia andersoni Jones, 1981
- Kontikia ashleyi (Fyfe, 1953)
- Kontikia assimilis (von Graff, 1899)
- Kontikia atrata (Steel, 1887)
- Kontikia bulbosa Sluys, 1983
- Kontikia canaliculata (von Graff, 1899)
- Kontikia chapmani (Ogren & Kawakatsu, 1988)
- Kontikia circularis (Fyfe, 1956)
- Kontikia cookiana (Schröder, 1924)
- Kontikia coxii (Fletcher & Hamilton, 1888)
- Kontikia cyanea (Fyfe, 1956)
- Kontikia forsterorum (Schröder, 1924)
- Kontikia insularis (Prudhore, 1949)
- Kontikia kenneli (von Graff, 1899)
- Kontikia lyra (Steel, 1901)
- Kontikia marrineri (Dendy, 1911)
- Kontikia melanochroa (Steel, 1901)
- Kontikia nasuta (Loman, 1890)
- Kontikia orana Froehlich, 1955
- Kontikia pelewensis (von Graff, 1899)
- Kontikia quadrilineata (Haslauer-Gamish, 1982)
- Kontikia ranuii (Fyfe, 1953)
- Kontikia renschi (Haslauer-Gamish, 1982)
- Kontikia traversii (Moseley, 1877)
- Kontikia ventrolineata (Dendy, 1892)
- Kontikia whartoni (Gulliver, 1879)
