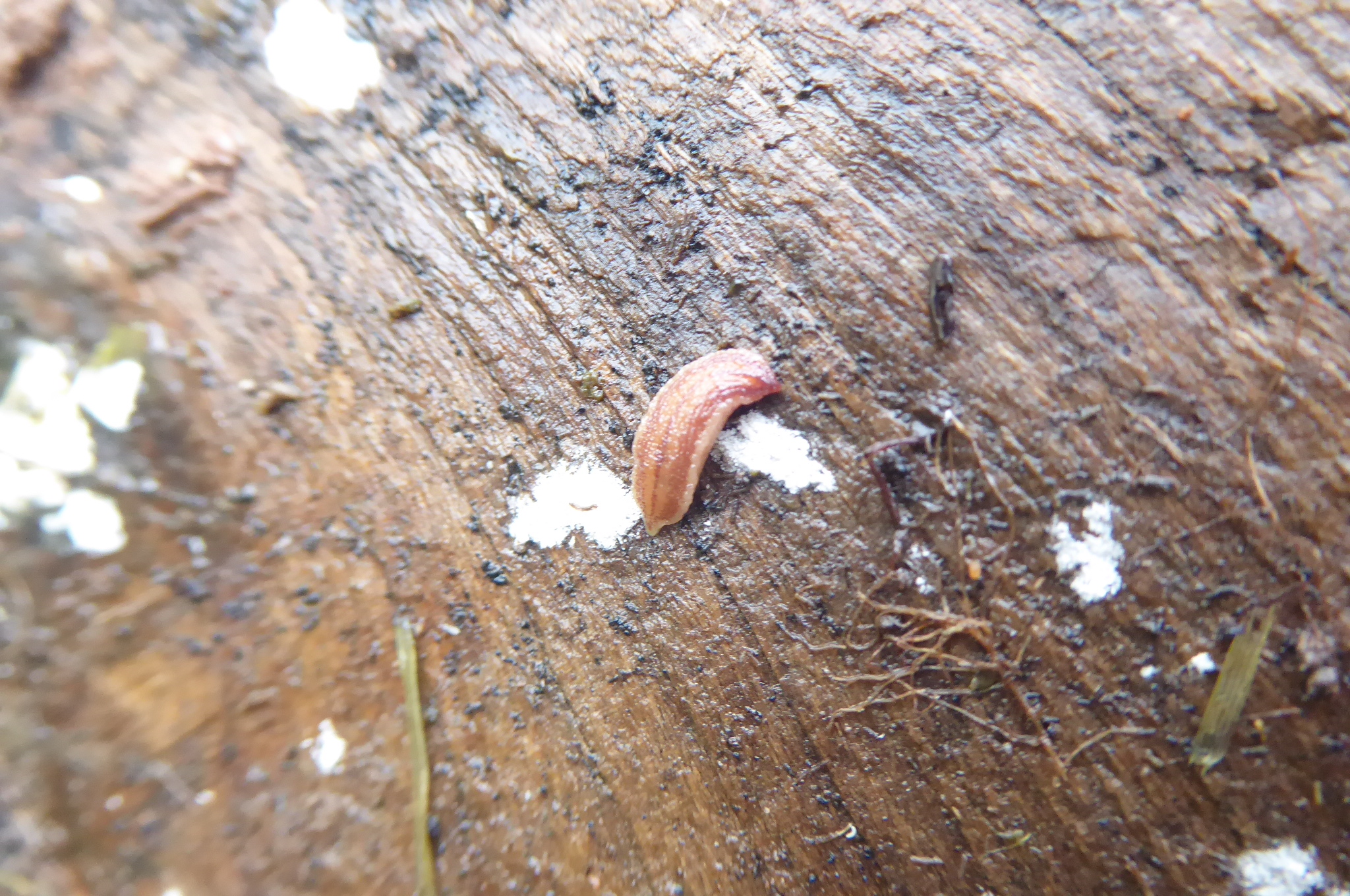

Scientific classification
- Kingdom: Animalia
- Phylum: Platyhelminthes
- Order: Tricladida
- Family: Geoplanidae
- Genus: Kontikia
- Species: K. andersoni

Binomial name
- Kontikia andersoni Jones, 1981

= Kontikia andersoni =

Species of flatworm

Kontikia andersoni is a species of land planarian. The species is known from the United Kingdom, and is currently invading a Sub‐Antarctic island, Macquarie Island.

== Molecular characterisation ==
The mitochondrial genome of Kontikia andersoni was studied in 2025. It could not be assembled; however, it was possible to extract both rRNA genes plus eleven of the protein coding genes.
