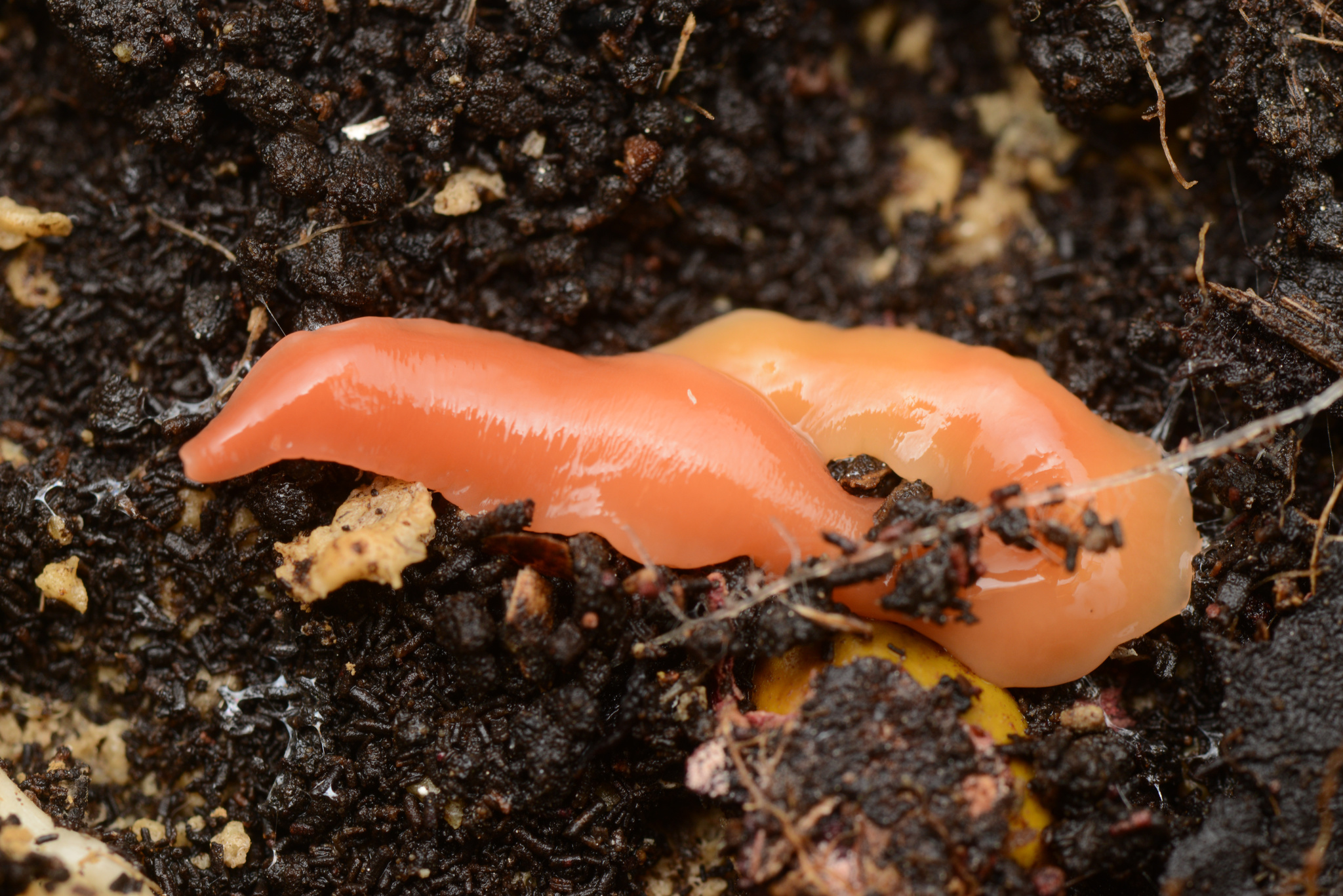

Scientific classification
- Kingdom: Animalia
- Phylum: Platyhelminthes
- Order: Tricladida
- Family: Geoplanidae
- Genus: Australoplana
- Species: A. sanguinea

Binomial name
- Australoplana sanguinea (Moseley, 1877)

Synonyms
- Australopacifica sanguinea (Moseley, 1877); Caenoplana sanguinea Moseley, 1877; Geoplana sanguinea Moseley, 1877

= Australoplana sanguinea =

Species of worm

Australoplana sanguinea also known as the Australian flatworm is a species of flatworm native to Australia. It has been locally introduced to New Zealand and is considered an invasive alien pest species in the UK. Two subspecies are currently recognized, A. s. alba (Jones, 1981) and A. s. sanguinea Moseley, 1877.

== Molecular characterisation ==
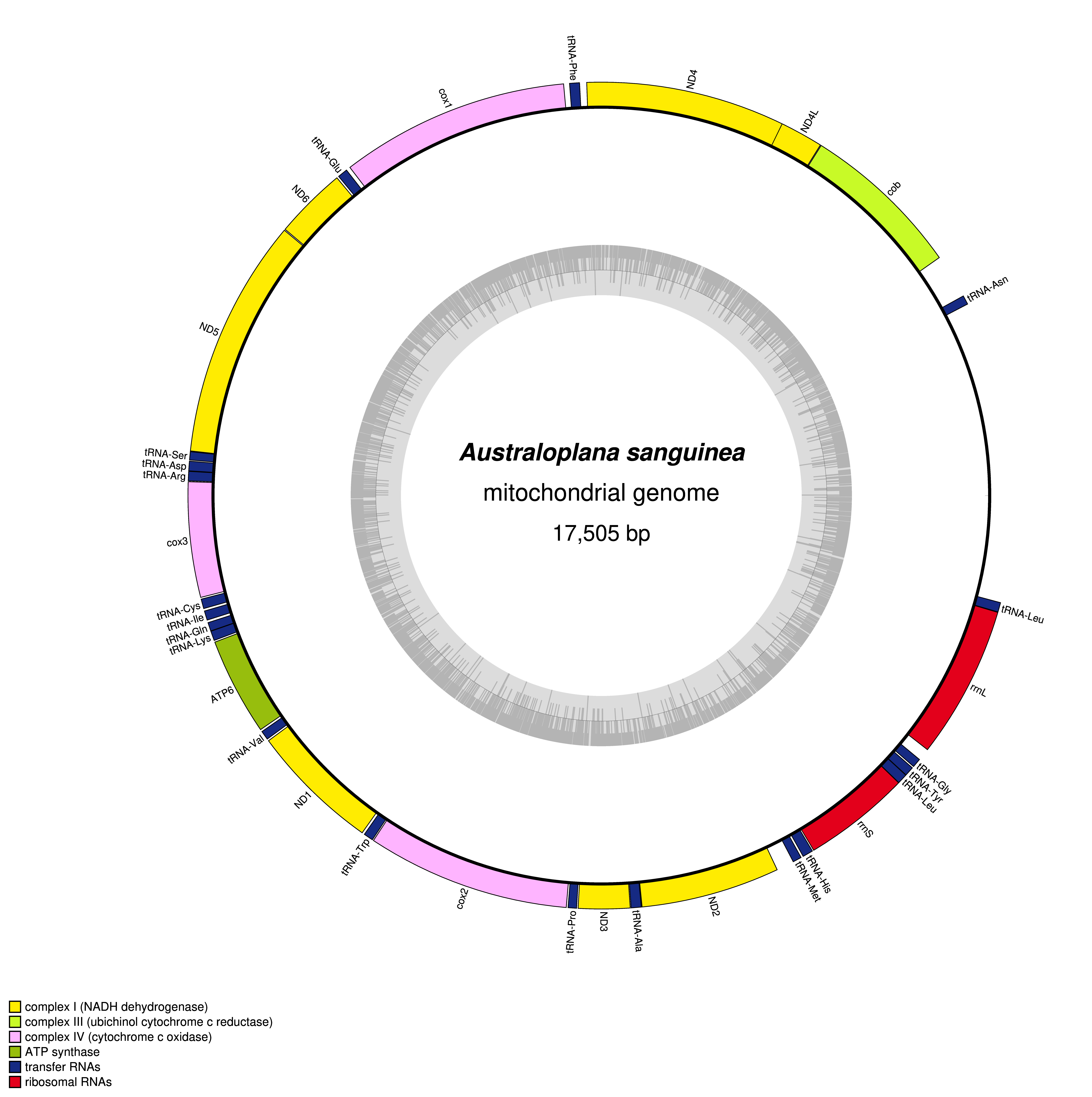
The mitogenome of Australoplana sanguinea

The mitochondrial genome of Australoplana sanguinea was described in 2025. It codes for the 12 conserved protein coding genes, 20 tRNA and two rRNA; its length is 17 505 bp, but it could not be circularized because of the lack of redundancy between its endings and the presence of repetitions.
