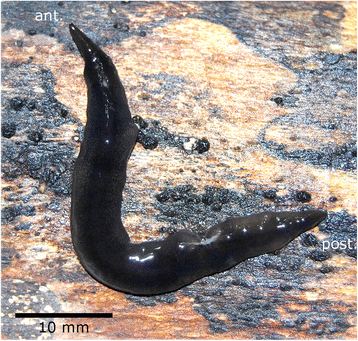

Scientific classification
- Kingdom: Animalia
- Phylum: Platyhelminthes
- Order: Tricladida
- Family: Geoplanidae
- Genus: Notogynaphallia
- Species: N. nawei

Binomial name
- Notogynaphallia nawei Negrete, Leal-Zanchet & Brusa, 2015

= Notogynaphallia nawei =

Species of flatworm

Notogynaphallia nawei is a species of land planarian from Argentina.

== Description ==
Notogynaphallia nawei is a small-to-medium-sized land planarian with an elongate body, reaching about 40 millimetres (1.6 in) in length. The color of the dorsum is black and the dorsal eyes are perceived as a group of very small whitish dots on about the second fourth of the body. The ventral side is dark gray with a thin whitish median longitudinal line along the body.

The species lacks a glandular margin, and the prostatic vesicle is intrabulbar with two regions: a tubular proximal portion and a globose distal portion, with a narrow lumen. The female atrium is tubular distally, but wide proximally.

== Etymology ==
The specific epithet nawei comes from the Toba word naweĨ, which means "black", and refers to the dorsal color of the species.

== Distribution ==
Notogynaphallia nawei is found in native forests of the Formosa Province, Argentina, part of the Gran Chaco region.
