= John Wilson (philanthropist) =

John Wilson (June 10, 1826 – September 15, 1900) was a successful businessman in Portland, Oregon, United States, where he was a prominent civic leader, an avid collector of books, and a philanthropist. Today Wilson is principally remembered as a great supporter of the Library Association of Portland, precursor of the Multnomah County Library, to which he donated his entire collection of over 8,000 volumes at his death in September 1900. Many of his more important volumes continue to form the core of the collection of the John Wilson Special Collection, named in his honor.

His half brother was the Australian naturalist Alexander Greenlaw Hamilton.

== Early years ==
John Wilson was born in Ardee, Ireland to John Wilson and Joyscelind Wynne. Wilson showed an interest in a career in the ministry before deciding to emigrate to the United States. Sailing around Cape Horn, Wilson arrived in California in 1848. He did a brief stint with the U.S. Army and unsuccessfully tried his hand at prospecting during the height of the gold rush. Wilson decided to leave California and move to Oregon after a chance meeting in San Francisco with early Portland pioneer and promoter Benjamin Stark in 1850. Stark convinced Wilson, as well as many others, that Oregon offered significant advantages for young men of Wilson's circumstances. Following their meeting, Wilson booked passage to Astoria on Capt. George H. Flanders' ship. Wilson settled in the St. Helens, Oregon, area where he soon found employment but found things "very dull". Wilson later recalled in an unpublished memoir "If I remained there all my life I would not be better off than the wealthiest of the neighbors...Poverty was their wealth...I concluded to go to Portland and cast my lot there."

== Business activities ==
Portland was fast becoming the center of economic activity in the Pacific Northwest when Wilson arrived in the summer of 1853. Wilson prospered in early Portland and his economic situation steadily improved. Following employment as a clerk in Raleigh's dry-goods store and as a bookkeeper for T.J. Dryer's Weekly Oregonian, Wilson was hired by the successful merchant Cicero Hunt Lewis in 1854. By 1856, the hard-working and thrifty Wilson was in a position to purchase the business of Robert and Finley McLaren for $1,500 in cash and a $6,000 note. In 1857, he formed a three-way partnership with Leland Wakefield of San Francisco and John Connor who ran a second Wilson store in Albany, Oregon. Wilson's business consisted of purchasing agricultural produce from the far-flung farms of the Willamette River Valley for re-sale in Portland or shipment to San Francisco. The farmers in turn bought much-needed goods and supplies from Wilson's store. In 1858, Wilson opened a store on First Street, the first commercial operation in Portland west of Front Street. Later, he moved the store again, becoming the first merchant to open an establishment on Third Street. By 1878, Wilson was in a position to divest his mercantile interests, selling his firm which then became known as Olds and King. For the remainder of his life Wilson focused on his real-estate holdings, civic interests, and book collecting.

== Philanthropic and social engagements ==
John Wilson was known to his fellow Portlanders as a quiet, studious man of sober habits and intense, diverse intellectual interests. After the death of his first wife, Wilson remarried and had children, settling his family in a large, comfortable house on Fourteenth Street and Taylor Street in what was then the western edge of the fast-growing Portland. Wilson's extensive collection of books, which was accessible to the public on Sundays, eventually came to occupy three large rooms on the ground floor of the home. Wilson was greatly interested in education and served for many years as director of Portland's schools. His passion for learning and books brought him into close affiliation with the Library Association of Portland. In 1863, Wilson's business partner Leland Wakefield began house to house canvassing to raise funds for a library and reading room. Prominent Portlanders such a William Ladd, Henry Failing, Henry Corbett, and Wilson's old boss Cicero Hunt Lewis all contributed money and time to the project. Several of them would eventually serve as directors for the Library Association. Though Wilson never served as director, he was intimately involved with this private institution which was eventually to become today's Multnomah County Library.

== Book collection ==
At the time of his death, Wilson had amassed one of the largest, if not the largest, private book collections in the western states. Prior to his death in September 1900, he made arrangements with the director of the Library Association of Portland to assume ownership of his entire collection which he endowed with $2,500 in gold, stipulating that the collection remain accessible to the general public. The gift provided the impetus for the construction of a new library building even though the Library Association had just completed construction of a large Italianate-style building after years of fund-raising in 1891.
