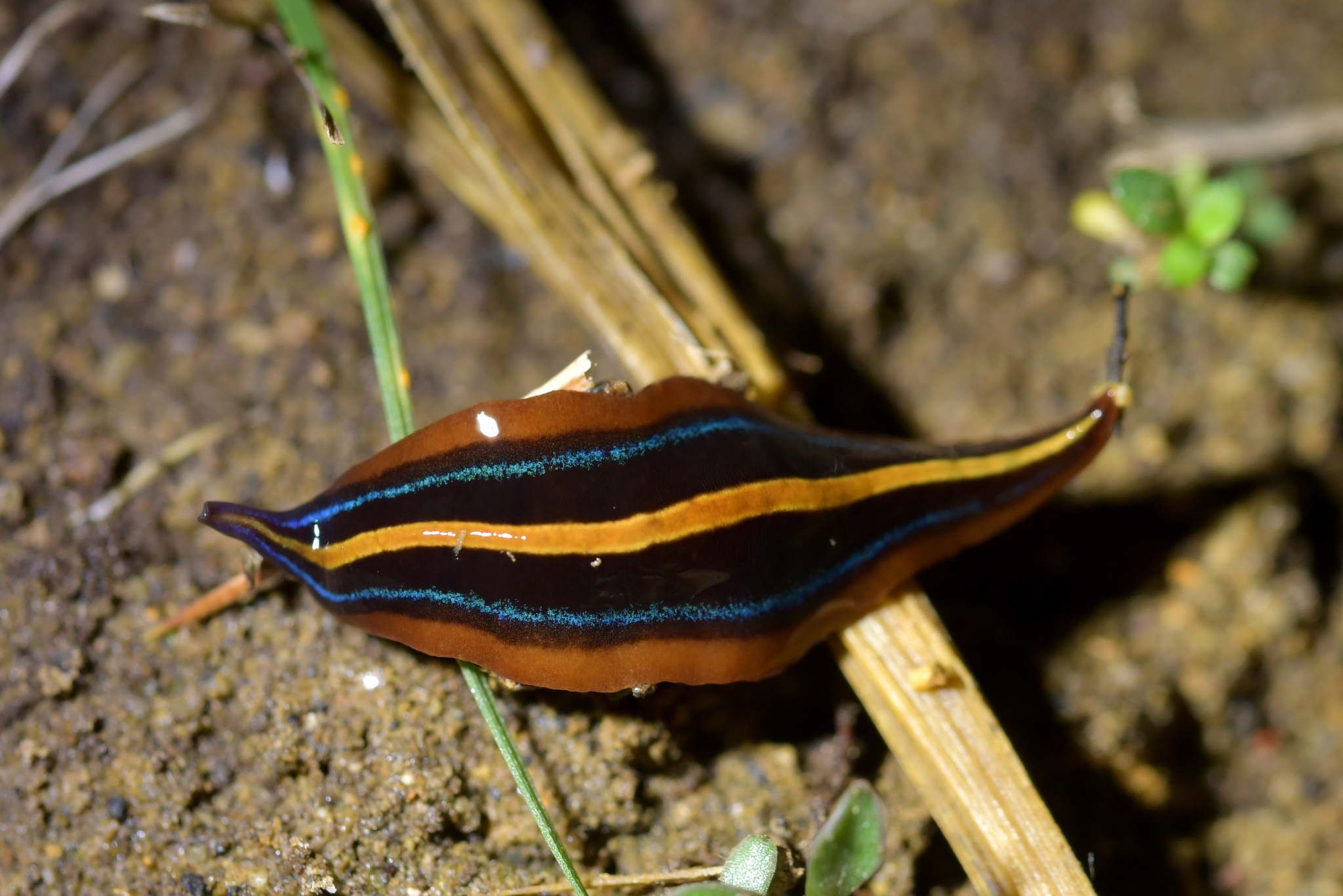
- Newzealandia iris
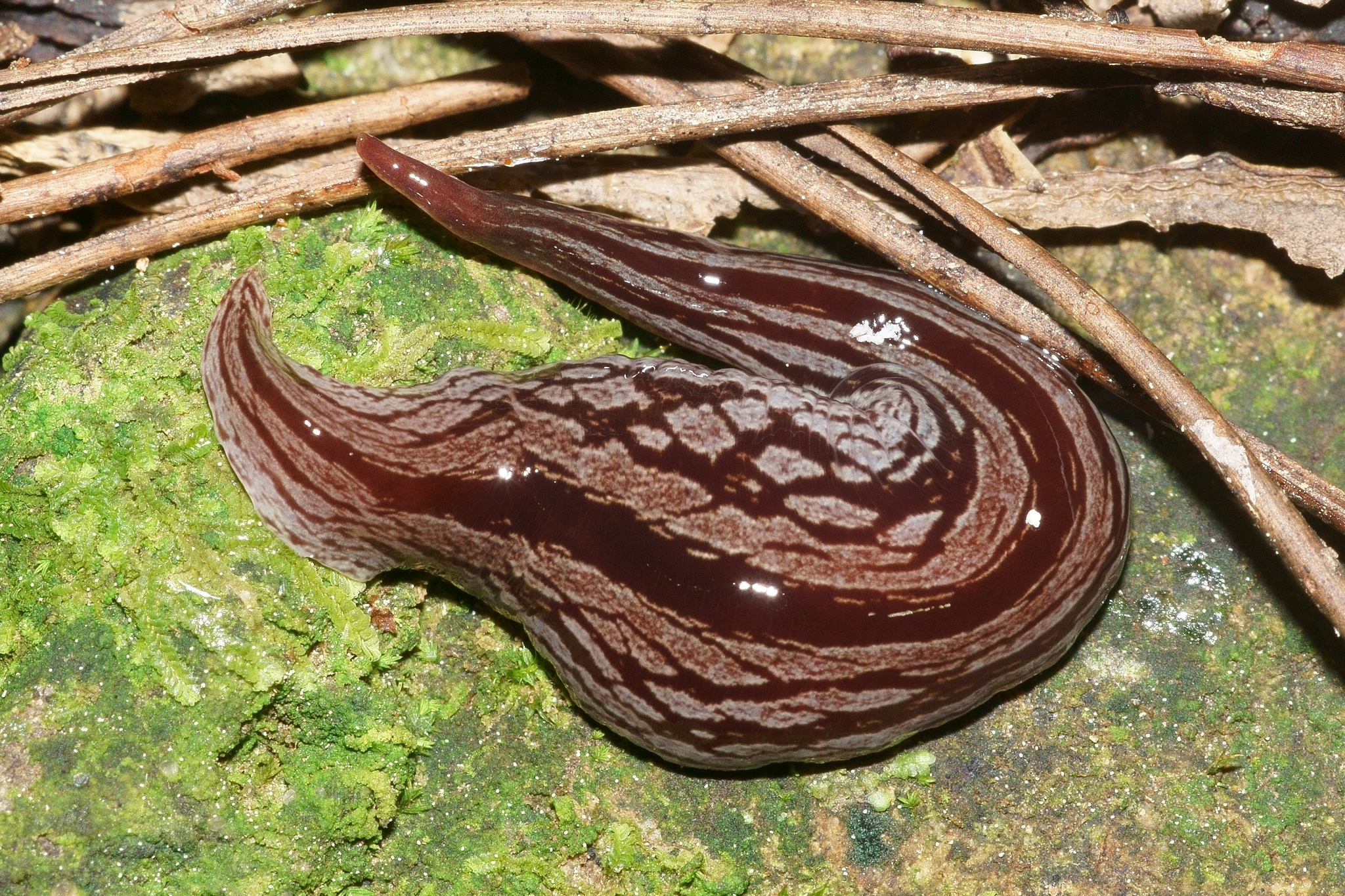
- Newzealandia exulans

Scientific classification
- Kingdom: Animalia
- Phylum: Platyhelminthes
- Order: Tricladida
- Family: Geoplanidae
- Tribe: Caenoplanini
- Genus: Newzealandia; Ogren & Kawakatsu, 1991

Type species
- Geoplana inaequabilis Fyfe, 1956

= Newzealandia =

Genus of flatworms

Newzealandia is a genus of land planarians from New Zealand.

== Description ==
Species of the genus Newzealandia are characterized by a copulatory apparatus that lacks a penis papilla and has a series of accessory glands embedded into the wall of the atrial cavity. Those glands are similar to the adenodactyls found in the closely related genus Artioposthia, the main difference being that adenodactyls project into the atrial cavity.

== Etymology ==
The name Newzealandia comes from New Zealand, the country in which the species of the genus are found.

== Species ==
The genus Newzealandia includes the following species:

- Newzealandia agricola (Dendy, 1895)
- Newzealandia graffii (Dendy, 1895)
- Newzealandia inaequabilis (Fyfe, 1956)
- Newzealandia inequalistriata (Dendy, 1895)
- Newzealandia iris (Dendy, 1896)
- Newzealandia moseleyi (Hutton, 1880)
