= Notogynaphallia fortuita =

Scientific classification
- Kingdom: Animalia
- Phylum: Platyhelminthes
- Order: Tricladida
- Family: Geoplanidae
- Genus: Notogynaphallia
- Species: N. fortuita

Binomial name
- Notogynaphallia fortuita Negrete, Diaz Gira & Brusa, 2019

Species of flatworm

Notogynaphallia fortuita is a species of land planarian belonging to the subfamily Geoplaninae. It is found within Argentina.

== Description ==
Notogynaphallia fortuita has a body shape between elongate and lanceolate. It's been found to reach about 20 mm in length and 3 mm in width, though can reach 30 mm when fully extended. It has nearly parallel margins, gradually tapering towards the anterior end and abruptly towards the posterior; both ends of the body are blunt. The base color of the dorsum is beige, with scattered dark spots all across. Along a thin line of the body, these spots are less dense, forming an ill-defined pale stripe running along the dorsum. The cephalic region of the dorsum is a saffron-yellow color. The ventral side is light grey.

== Etymology ==
The specific epithet is derived from the Latin fortuitus, meaning "casual, by chance"; this is due to the fact that only a single type specimen of N. fortuita was found after several searches of the area.

== Distribution ==
Notogynaphallia fortuita is only known from a type specimen found on Isla Paulino, in Berisso, Argentina. It was found on the ground under a fallen log.
