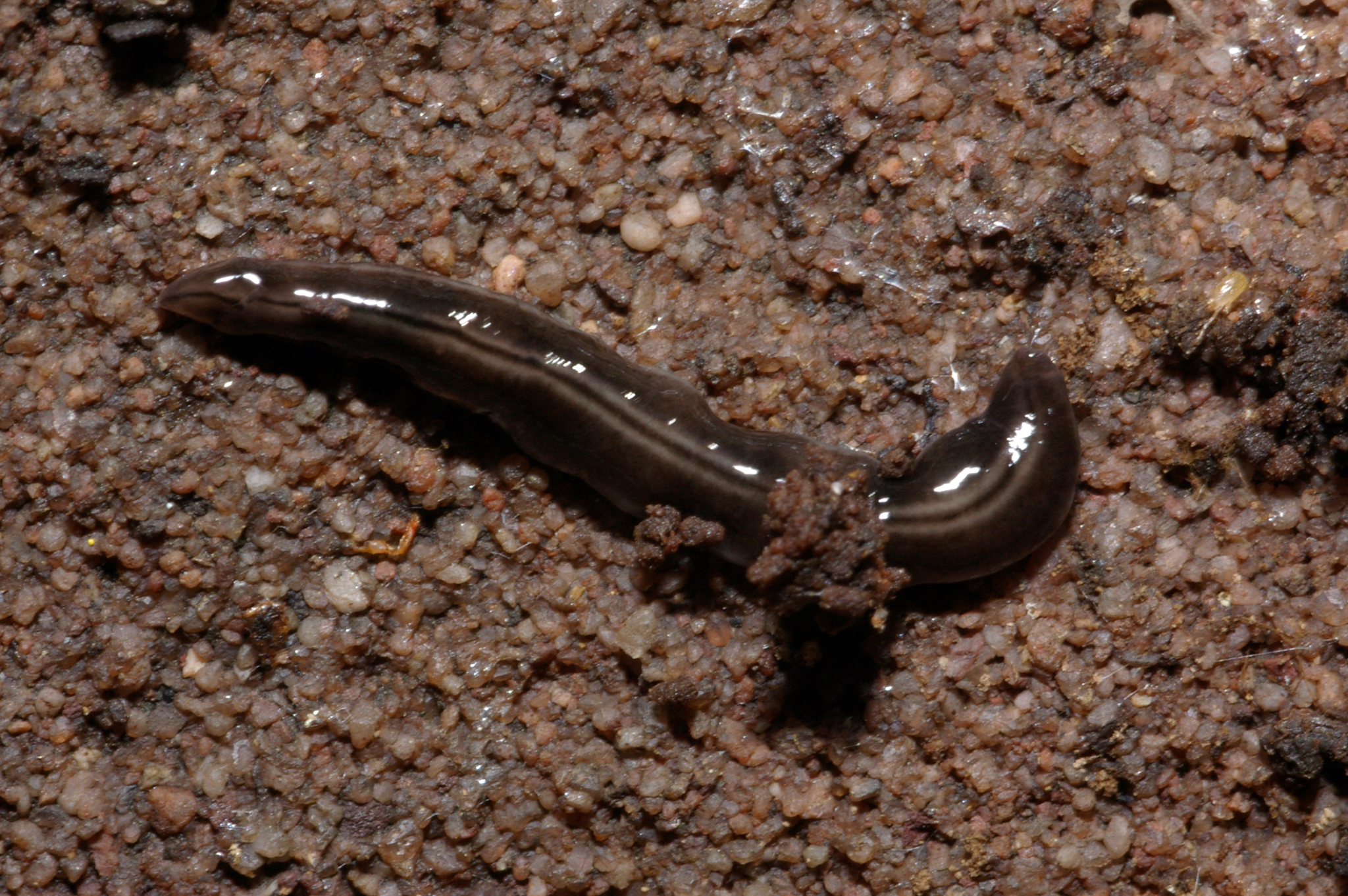

Scientific classification
- Kingdom: Animalia
- Phylum: Platyhelminthes
- Order: Tricladida
- Family: Geoplanidae
- Genus: Kontikia
- Species: K. ventrolineata

Binomial name
- Kontikia ventrolineata (Dendy, 1892)

Synonyms
- Geoplana ventrolineata Dendy, 1892; Parakontikia ventrolineata (Dendy, 1892); Geoplana mexicana Hyman, 1939; Kontikia mexiana (Hyman), 1939

= Kontikia ventrolineata =

Species of flatworm

Kontikia ventrolineata is a species of land planarian.

== Description ==
Kontikia ventrolineata has a very dark gray, almost black dorsal color with two narrow lines of light gray that enclose a median dark-gray line of about the same with. There is also a similar light gray line that runs at the border of either side. The venter shows a pair of brownish longitudinal stripes on a gray background. The eyes form a single row around the anterior end and continue laterally to the hind end.

== Range ==
This flatworm is probably native to Australia, from where it was first described. However, it has been accidentally introduced to several countries, including New Zealand, Mexico, South Africa, Ireland, England, France, Spain, and Italy.

== Taxonomy ==
Originally described as Geoplana ventrolineata by Dendy, this species was later transferred to the genus Parakontikia as its type-species. Parakontikia was differentiated from the closely related genus Kontikia by the lack of a penis papilla, which is present in Kontikia. However, a later analysis of specimens found in South Africa and England revealed that they matched the description of both Parakontikia ventrolineata and Kontikia mexicana and that both species differed solely by the presence of a penis papilla in the latter, with both color pattern and the internal structure being identical. As a result, both species were synonymized under the new combination Kontikia ventrolineata. However, despite this synonymization, the name Parakontikia ventrolineata is still widely used to refer to this species.

== Molecular characterisation ==
The complete mitogenome of Kontikia ventrolineata is 17,210 bp in length. and shows a cytochrome c oxidase subunit 2 gene unusually long, a characteristic shared with other members of the subfamily Rhynchodeminae.
