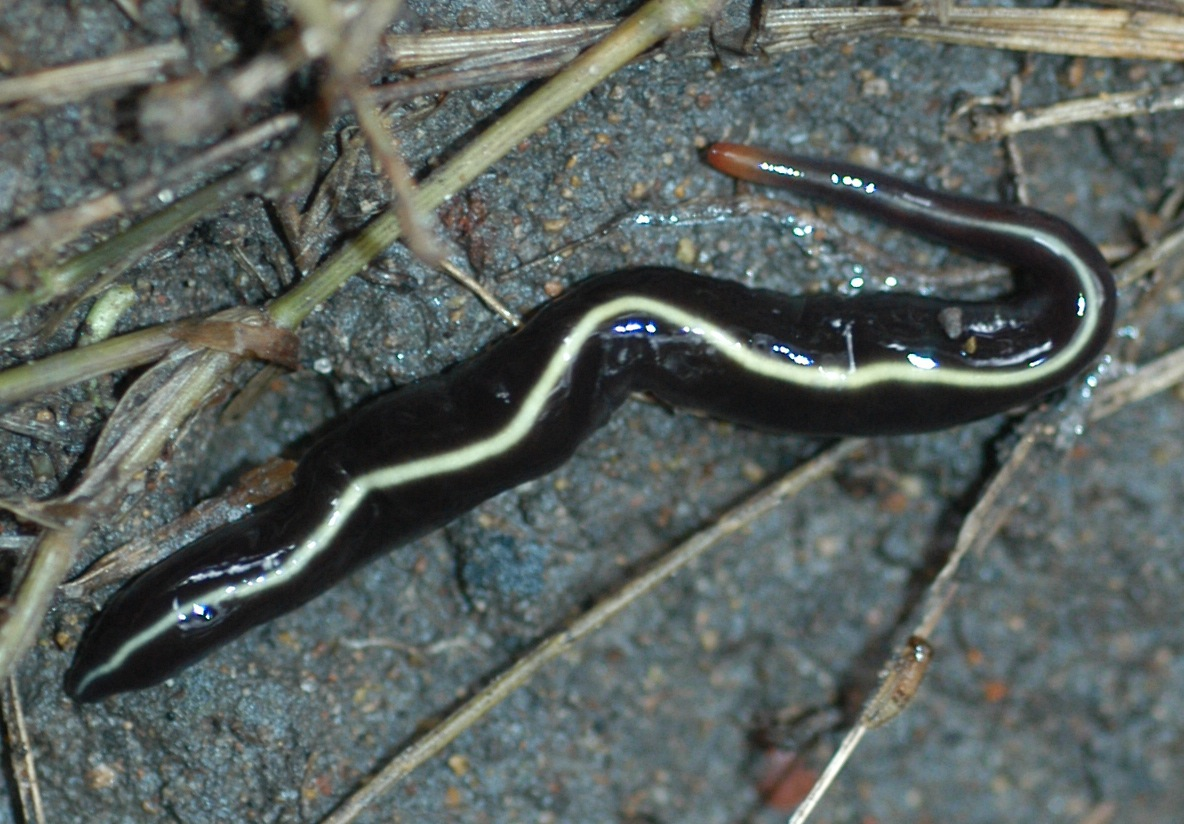
- Caenoplana coerulea

Scientific classification
- Kingdom: Animalia
- Phylum: Platyhelminthes
- Order: Tricladida
- Family: Geoplanidae
- Tribe: Caenoplanini
- Genus: Caenoplana; Moseley, 1877

Type species
- Caenoplana coerulea Moseley, 1877

Synonyms
- Elattodemus Haslauer-Gamisch, 1982

= Caenoplana =

Genus of flatworms

Caenoplana is a genus of land planarians from Australia and New Zealand.

== Description ==
The genus Caenoplana is characterized by having an elongate, cylindrical to sub-cylindrical body. The eyes are arranged along the body margins, crowded irregularly at the sides of the anterior end and extending in a single row to the posterior end. The copulatory apparatus lacks a permanent penis, i. e., the penis is formed during copulation by folds in the male cavity. The female cavity is irregular and narrow and the ovovitelline ducts join each other behind it, entering it ventrally.

== Species ==
The following species are recognised in the genus Caenoplana:

- Caenoplana albolineata (Steel, 1897)
- Caenoplana barringtonensis (Wood, 1926)
- Caenoplana citrina (Wood, 1926)
- Caenoplana coerulea Moseley, 1877 – Blue garden flatworm
- Caenoplana daemeli (Graff, 1899)
- Caenoplana decolorata Mateos, Jones, Riutort, & Álvarez-Presas, 2020
- Caenoplana dubia (Dendy, 1891)
- Caenoplana graffi (Froehlich, 1959)
- Caenoplana hillii (Steel, 1897)
- Caenoplana hoggii (Dendy, 1891) – Hogg's flatworm
- Caenoplana micholitzi (Graff, 1899)
- Caenoplana munda Fletcher & Hamilton, 1888
- Caenoplana ponderosa (Steel, 1897)
- Caenoplana purpurea (Dendy, 1895)
- Caenoplana sieboldi (Graff, 1899)
- Caenoplana spenceri Dendy, 1889 – Spencer's flatworm
- Caenoplana steenstrupi Krsmanovie, 1898
- Caenoplana steinboecki (Haslauer-Gamisch, 1982)
- Caenoplana sulphurea (Fletcher & Hamilton, 1888)
- Caenoplana tenuis (Dendy, 1895)
- Caenoplana variegata (Fletcher & Hamilton, 1888) – Two-toned planarian
- Caenoplana viridis (Fletcher & Hamilton, 1888)
