= Coleocephalus =

Coleocephalus fuscus

Scientific classification
- Kingdom: Animalia
- Phylum: Platyhelminthes
- Order: Tricladida
- Family: Geoplanidae
- Tribe: Caenoplanini
- Genus: Coleocephalus; Fyfe, 1953
- Species: C. fuscus

Binomial name
- Coleocephalus fuscus Fyfe, 1953

Genus of flatworms

Coleocephalus is a genus of land planarians that currently contains a single species, Coleocephalus fuscus, from Enderby Island, New Zealand.

== Description ==
The genus Coleocephalus is characterized by an anterior end that is curved downwards and partially covers an oval glandular area on the ventral surface. This glandular area has a folded epithelium with gland cells and openings of glands from the mesenchyme. The copulatory apparatus has adenodactyls and a penis papilla.
