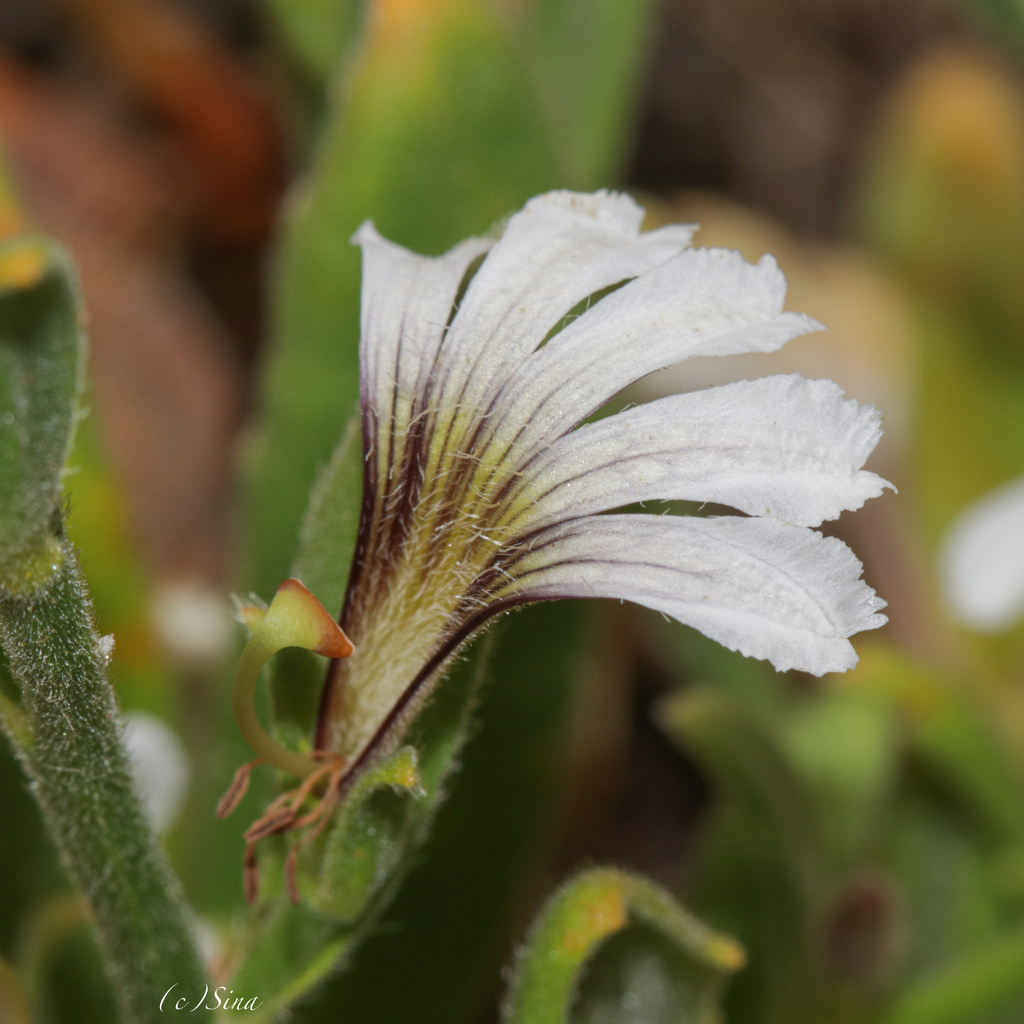

Scientific classification
- Kingdom: Plantae
- Clade: Tracheophytes
- Clade: Angiosperms
- Clade: Eudicots
- Clade: Asterids
- Order: Asterales
- Family: Goodeniaceae
- Genus: Scaevola
- Species: S. hamiltonii

Binomial name
- Scaevola hamiltonii Labill.

= Scaevola hamiltonii =

Species of flowering plant

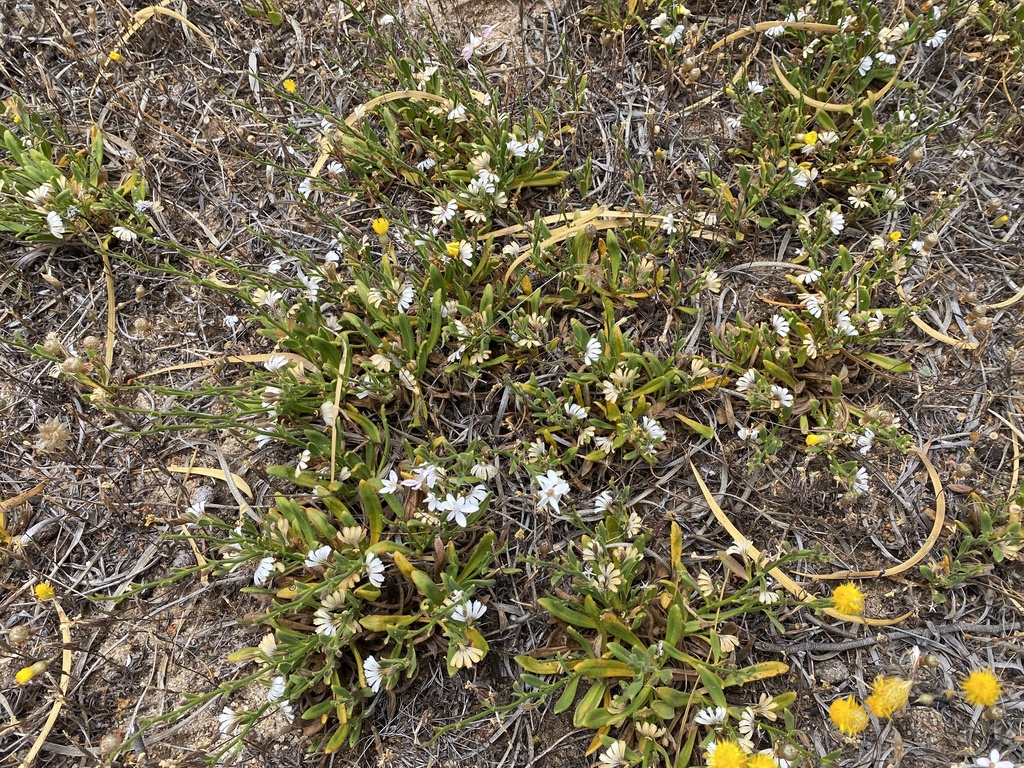
Habit near Nungarin

Scaevola hamiltonii is a species of flowering plant in the family Goodeniaceae and is endemic to the south of Western Australia. It is a stiff, erect perennial herb with many striated stems and more or less sessile, linear to lance-shaped, sometimes toothed leaves, white, cream-coloured or lilac flowers and spherical fruit.

== Description ==
Scaevola hamiltonii is a stiff, erect perennial herb with many striated stems, that typically grows to a height of up to 45 cm (18 in) with long, stiff, simple or curved and minute glandular hairs. The leaves are more or less sessile or on a short petiole, sometimes toothed, linear to lance-shaped with the narrower end towards the base, 5–80 mm (0.20–3.15 in) long and 1–10 mm (0.039–0.394 in) wide. The flowers are borne in spikes or thyrses up to 150 mm (5.9 in) long, with leaf-like bracts and linear bracteoles 3.5–5 mm (0.14–0.20 in) long. The sepals are triangular, 1 mm (0.039 in) long and free from each other, and the petals are white, cream-coloured or lilac, 7–17 mm (0.28–0.67 in) long, hairy outside and bearded inside with wings 1.5 mm (0.059 in) wide. Flowering mainly occurs from August to December, and the fruit is spherical, about 3 mm (0.12 in) in diameter.

== Taxonomy and naming ==
Scaevola hamiltonii was first formally described in 1912 by Kurt Krause in Engler's Das Pflanzenreich. The specific epithet (hamiltonii) honours Alexander Greenlaw Hamilton, president of the Linnean Society of New South Wales 1915–1917.

== Distribution and habitat ==
This species of Scaevola grows in sandy soil from the Murchison River south to Cadoux and inland to Lake Moore in the Avon Wheatbelt, Geraldton Sandplains and Yalgoo bioregions of southern Western Australia.

== Conservation status ==
Scaevola hamiltonii is listed as 'not threatened' by the Government of Western Australia Department of Parks and Wildlife.
