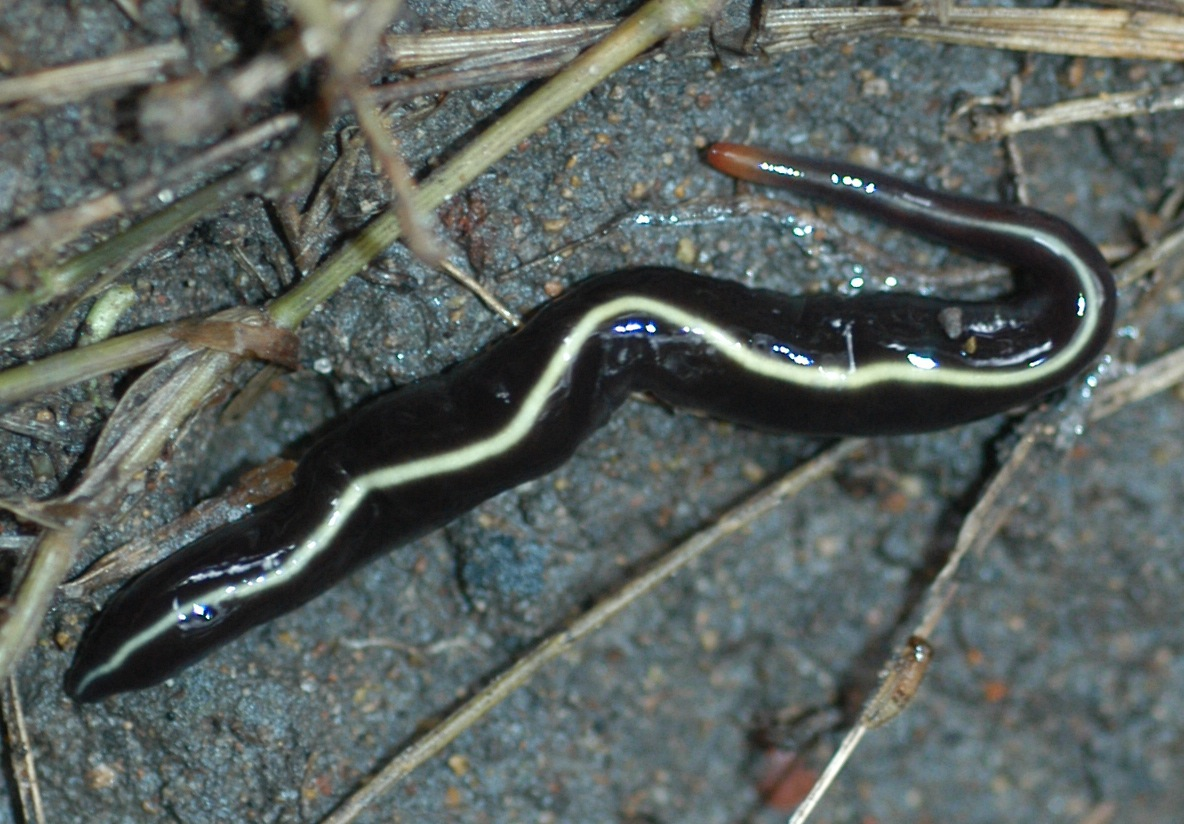

Scientific classification
- Kingdom: Animalia
- Phylum: Platyhelminthes
- Order: Tricladida
- Family: Geoplanidae
- Genus: Caenoplana
- Species: C. coerulea

Binomial name
- Caenoplana coerulea Moseley, 1877

= Caenoplana coerulea =

Blue planarian

Species of flatworm

Caenoplana coerulea, known as the blue planarian or blue garden flatworm is a species of land planarian.

== Description ==
This is a long narrow flatworm, which is shiny black or dark brown on the upper surface, and mid-blue underneath (hence the specific epithet and the common name of "blue planarian".) There is a narrow creamy/fawn or yellow coloured longitudinal stripe running down the center of the upper surface. Multiple eyespots are present. The head on some individuals has a pinkish appearance. The adult length is 6 to 12 cm.

== Range ==
This flatworm is native to Eastern Australia, however it has been accidentally introduced to New Zealand, the Balearic Islands, Argentina, Canary Islands, France, U.K (Portsmouth) and the USA (including California, Florida, Georgia, Texas, South Carolina and Iowa).

== Habitat ==
It is found in moist forest areas, and during drier periods it shelters under rocks, rotting logs and in leaf litter. It is often seen after periods of heavy rain.

== Life habits ==
This planarian is a predator of a variety of invertebrates on the forest floor. It is known to feed on several arthropod groups, such as woodlice, millipedes and earwigs, as well as on land snails.

== Molecular characterisation ==
The complete mitogenome of Caenoplana coerulea is 18,621 bp in length. Its main characteristic is a cytochrome c oxidase subunit 2 gene of unusual length, with a cox2 encoded protein 505 aa in length (compared to about 250 aa in other geoplanids); this characteristic of a very long cox2 is also found in other members of the subfamily Rhynchodeminae, to which Caenoplana coerulea belongs.

== Gallery ==
Showing color variation and more detail

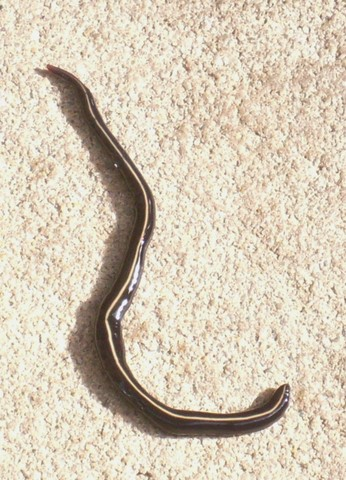
Caenoplana coerulea

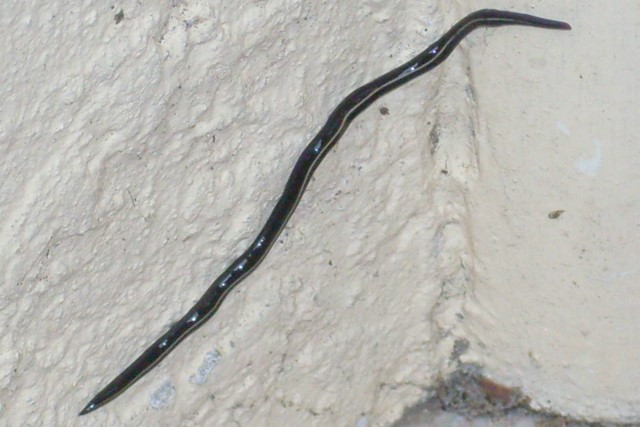
Caenoplana coerulea

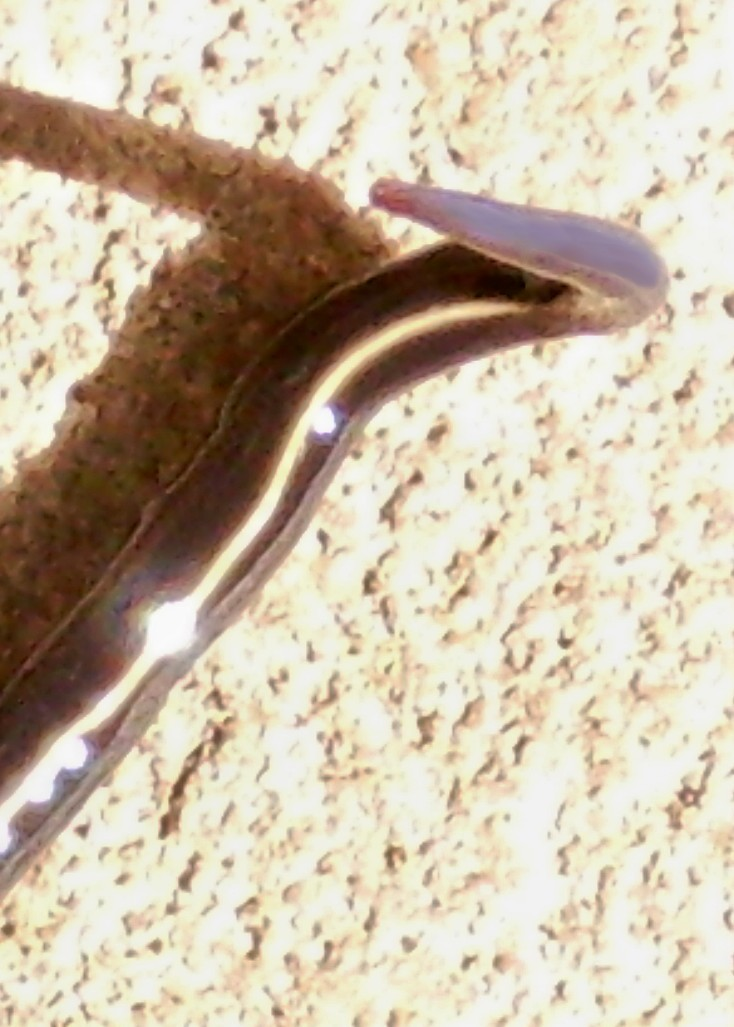
Caenoplana coerulea

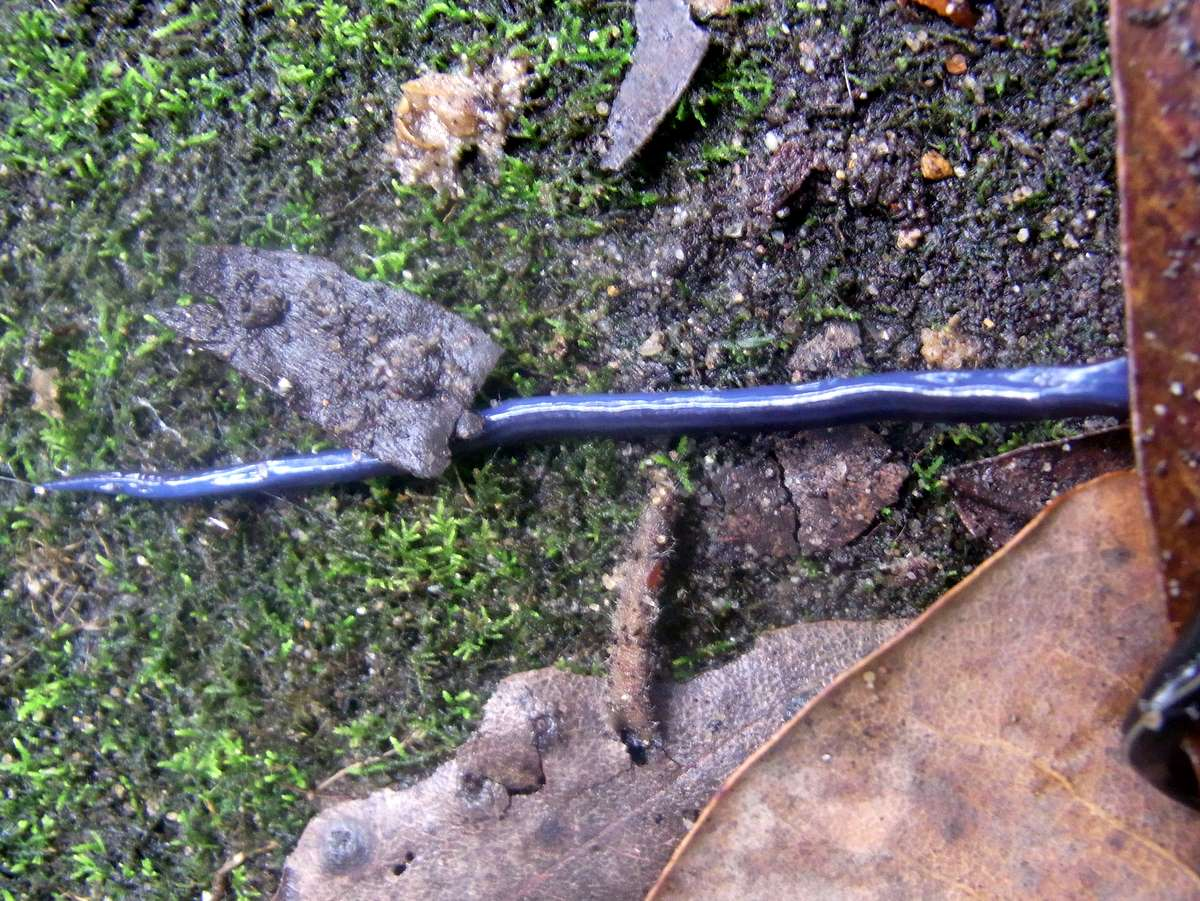
Caenoplana coerulea upturned
