= Pimea =

Pimea monticola

Scientific classification
- Kingdom: Animalia
- Phylum: Platyhelminthes
- Order: Tricladida
- Family: Geoplanidae
- Genus: Pimea; Winsor, 1991
- Species: P. monticola

Binomial name
- Pimea monticola Winsor, 1991

Genus of flatworms

Pimea is a genus of land planarians that currently contains a single species, Pimea monticola, from the central highlands of New Caledonia.

== Description ==
Pimea monticola is characterized by an expanded anterior end with a musculo-glandular organ in the form of an adhesive pad. The cutaneous longitudinal musculature is partially sunk into the mesenchyma and originates a retractor muscle associated to the musculo-glandular organ. The mesenchymal musculature is weak. The copulatory apparatus lacks adenodactyls and has an intra-antral penis papilla.

== Etymology ==
The genus name Pimea comes from a pre-colonial Melanesian clan, the Pime, that lived in an area close to the type-locality. The specific epithet monticola comes from Latin mons, a mountain + -cola, dweller, inhabitant, thus meaning "mountain dweller".
