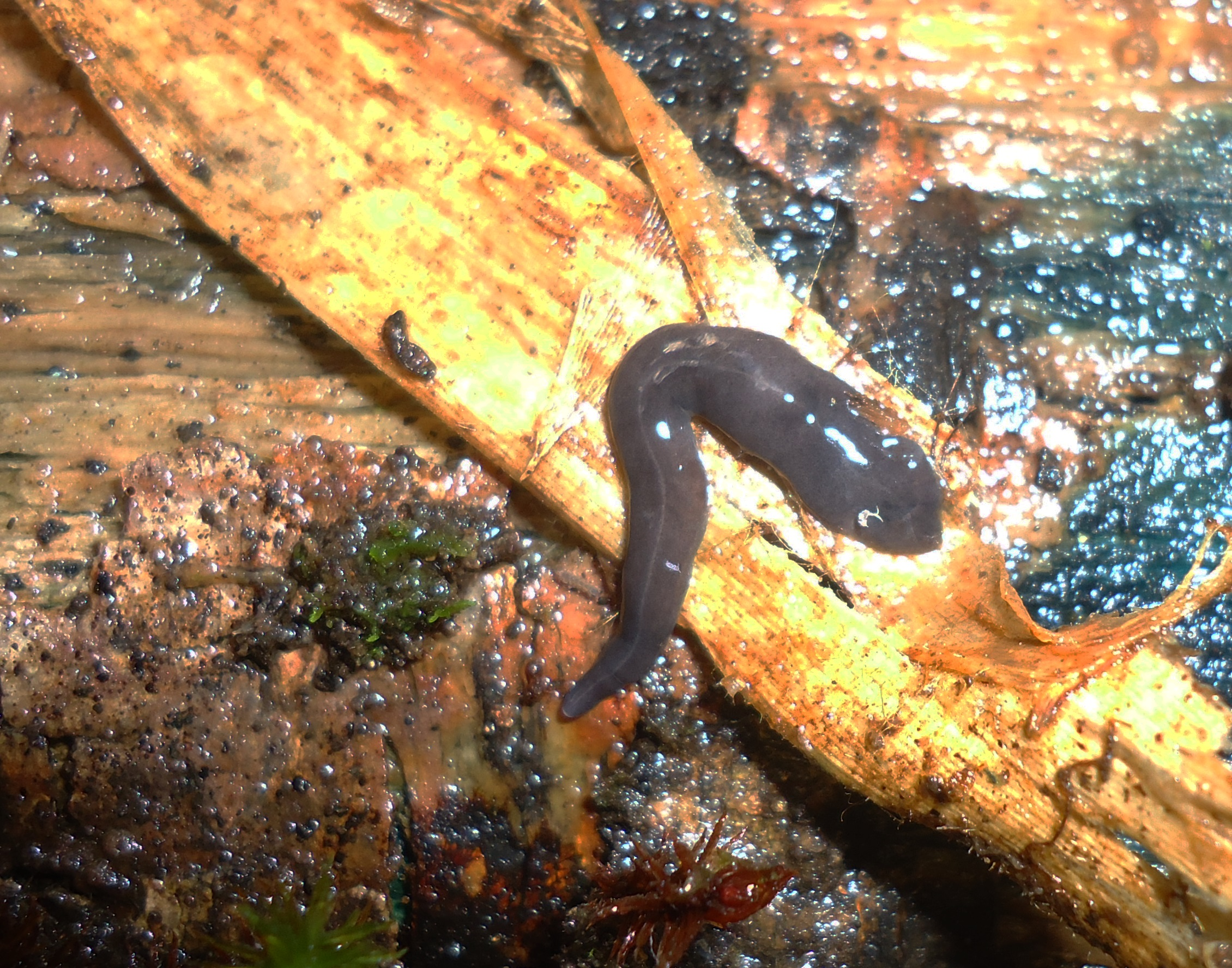
- Notogynaphallia plumbea

Scientific classification
- Kingdom: Animalia
- Phylum: Platyhelminthes
- Order: Tricladida
- Family: Geoplanidae
- Subfamily: Geoplaninae
- Genus: Notogynaphallia; Ogren & Kawakatsu, 1990

Type species
- Geoplana plumbea Froehlich, 1956

= Notogynaphallia =

Genus of flatworms

Notogynaphallia is a genus of land planarians from South America.

== Description ==
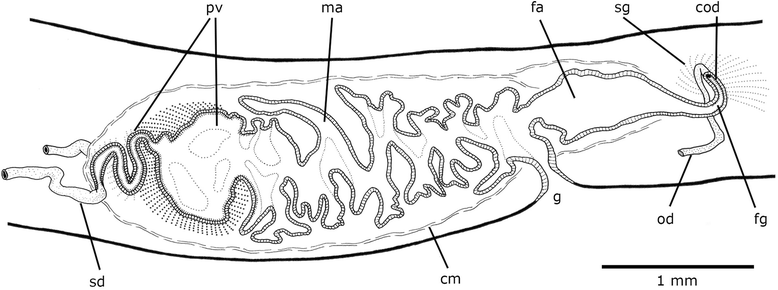
Schematic drawing of the copulatory apparatus of Notogynaphallia nawei showing the prostatic vesicle (pv) opening directly into the male atrium (am) and the ovovitelline ducts (od) joining and forming the common ovovitelline duct (cod) behind the female atrium (fa).

The genus Notogynaphallia is characterized by having a small-to-medium, slender body with nearly parallel margins. The eyes are arranged along the body margins and may or not spread to the dorsum. The copulatory apparatus lacks a permanent penis, i. e., the penis is formed during copulation by folds in the male atrium. The male part of the copulatory apparatus also lacks an ejaculatory duct, so that the prostatic vesicle opens directly into the male atrium. The female atrium is usually irregular and narrow and the ovovitelline ducts join each other behind it.

== Etymology ==
The name Notogynaphallia comes from Greek νότος (back) + γυνή (female) + ἀ (without) + φαλλός (phallus, penis), i.e., "dorsal female without penis", referring to ovovitelline ducts entering the female atrium dorsally and the absence of a permanent penis.

== Species ==
There are nine species assigned to the genus Notogynaphallia:

- Notogynaphallia biseminalis (Riester, 1938)
- Notogynaphallia fortuita Negrete, Gira & Brusa, 2019
- Notogynaphallia froehlichae Ogren & Kawakatsu, 1990
- Notogynaphallia modesta (von Graff, 1899)
- Notogynaphallia mourei (Froehlich, 1956)
- Notogynaphallia nawei Negrete, Leal-Zanchet & Brusa, 2015
- Notogynaphallia parca (E. M. Froehlich, 1955)
- Notogynaphallia plumbea (Froehlich, 1956)
- Notogynaphallia sexstriata (Graff, 1899)
- Notogynaphallia urku Negrete, Vega Tuesta & Brusa, 2023

Also, there are some species currently considered incertae sedis:

- Notogynaphallia andina (Hyman, 1962)
- Notogynaphallia atra (Schultze & Müller, 1857)
- Notogynaphallia garua (du Bois-Reymond Marcus, 1951)
- Notogynaphallia quinquestriata (Hyman, 1962)

Several species formerly placed in Notogynaphallia are currently placed in the genera Imbira and Luteostriata.
