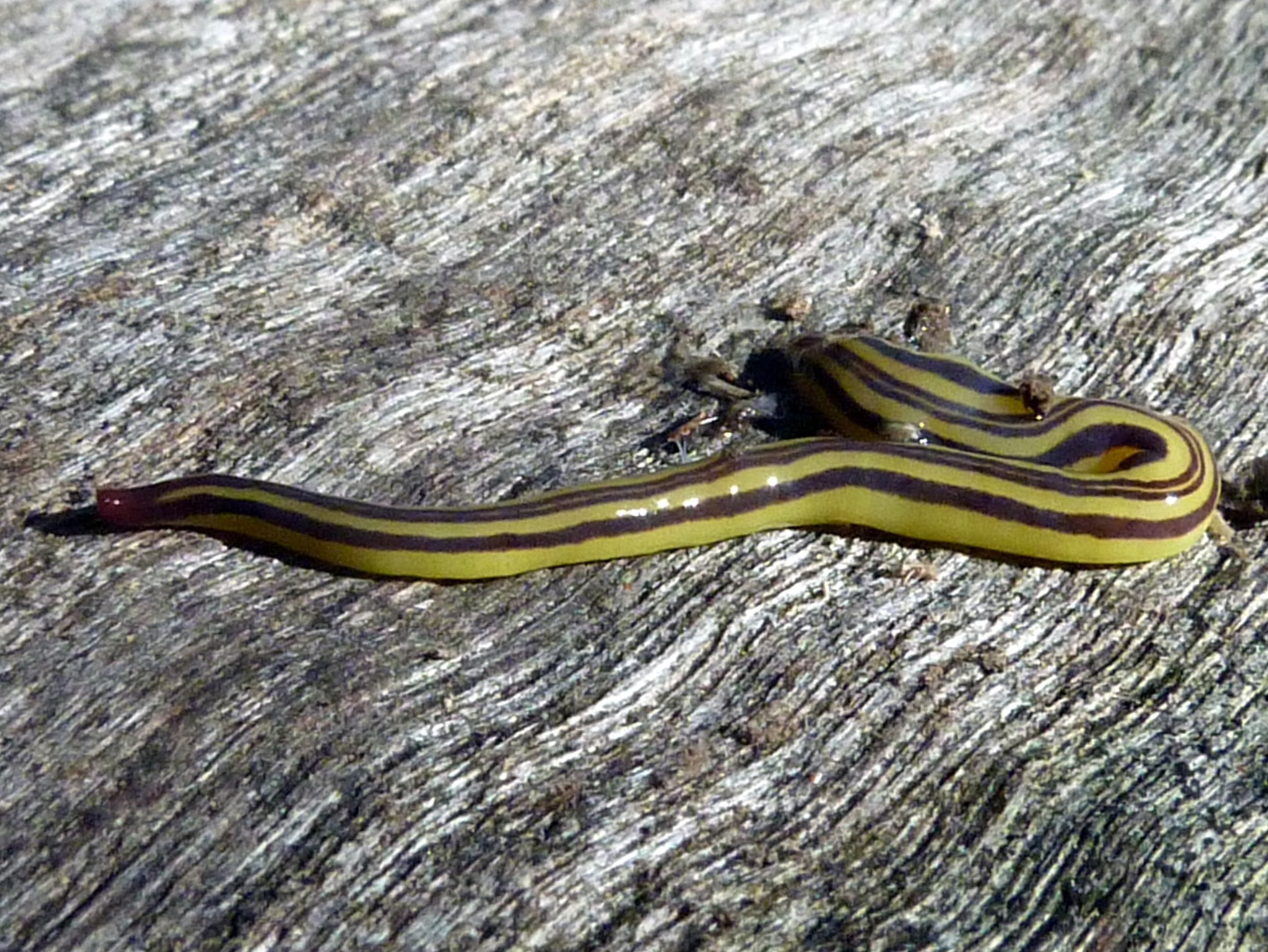

Scientific classification
- Kingdom: Animalia
- Phylum: Platyhelminthes
- Order: Tricladida
- Family: Geoplanidae
- Genus: Caenoplana
- Species: C. sulphurea

Binomial name
- Caenoplana sulphurea (Fletcher & Hamilton, 1888)

= Caenoplana sulphurea =

Species of Australian land planarian

Caenoplana sulphurea is a species of land planarian found in southeastern Australia and since introduced to New Zealand.

Caenoplana sulphurea was originally described under the name Geoplana sulphurea (Note: It was actually misprinted as "sulphureus" but this was corrected in the errata.) in the Proceedings of the Linnean Society of New South Wales in 1888.

Caenoplana sulphurea is yellow with stripes ranging in colour from greenish grey to black. There are two sets of stripes, one outer and one inner, the latter being wider and darker than the former. The species is found in New South Wales and Victoria, as well as being introduced to New Zealand.
