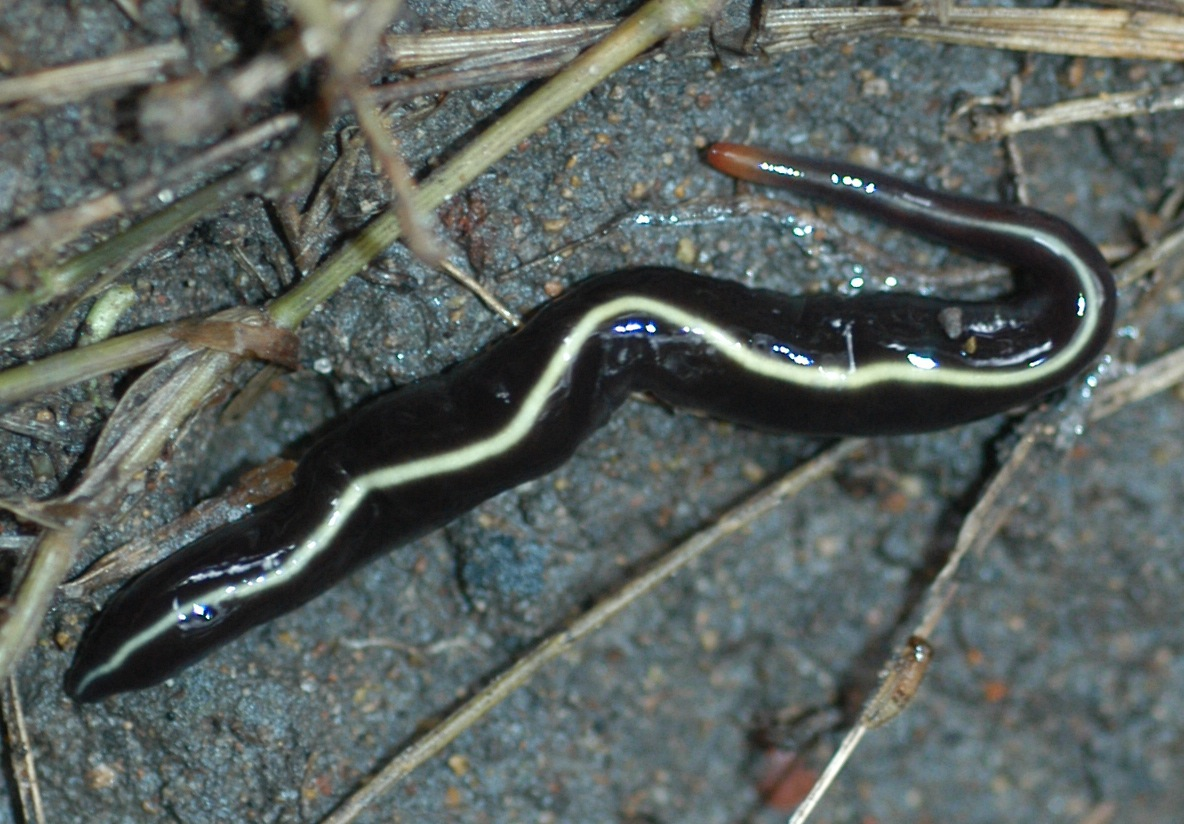
- Caenoplana coerulea

Scientific classification
- Domain: Eukaryota
- Kingdom: Animalia
- Phylum: Platyhelminthes
- Order: Tricladida
- Family: Geoplanidae
- Subfamily: Rhynchodeminae
- Tribe: Caenoplanini

Genera
- See text.

Synonyms
- Caenoplaninae Ogren & Kawakatsu, 1991

= Caenoplanini =

Tribe of flatworms

Caenoplanini is a tribe of land planarians in the subfamily Rhynchodeminae mostly found throughout the Australasian and Oceanian realms.

== Description ==
The tribe Caenoplanini is defined as containing land planarians with multiple eyes along the body, which do not spread dorsally, ventrally located testes and a thick layer of longitudinal muscles.

== Phylogeny and systematics ==
Based on morphological evidence, species now classified as Caenoplanini were initially considered a subfamily, Caenoplaninae, and sister group of the subfamily Geoplaninae. Both were united by the presence of multiple eyes along the body and distinguished from each other by the presence of dorsal testes in Geoplaninae and ventral ones in Caenoplaninae.

However, molecular studies revealed that this classification was artificial and that Caenoplaninae were actually closely related to Rhynchodeminae. Therefore, recent classification puts the former subfamilies Rhynchodeminae and Caenoplaninae as tribes, respectively Rhynchodemini and Caenoplanini, within an expanded subfamily Rhynchodeminae. This group is supported by molecular phylogeny, but there are no known synapomorphies.

== Genera ==
Currently the tribe Caenoplanini comprises the following genera:

- Arthurdendyus Jones, 1999
- Artioposthia von Graff, 1896
- Australopacifica Ogren & Kawakatsu, 1991
- Australoplana Winsor, 1991
- Caenoplana Moseley, 1877
- Coleocephalus Fyfe, 1953
- Endeavouria Ogren & Kawakatsu, 1991
- Fletchamia Winsor, 1991
- Kontikia C. G. Froehlich, 1955
- Lenkunya Winsor, 1991
- Newzealandia Ogren & Kawakatsu, 1991
- Pimea Winsor, 1991
- Reomkago Winsor, 1991
- Tasmanoplana Winsor, 1991
