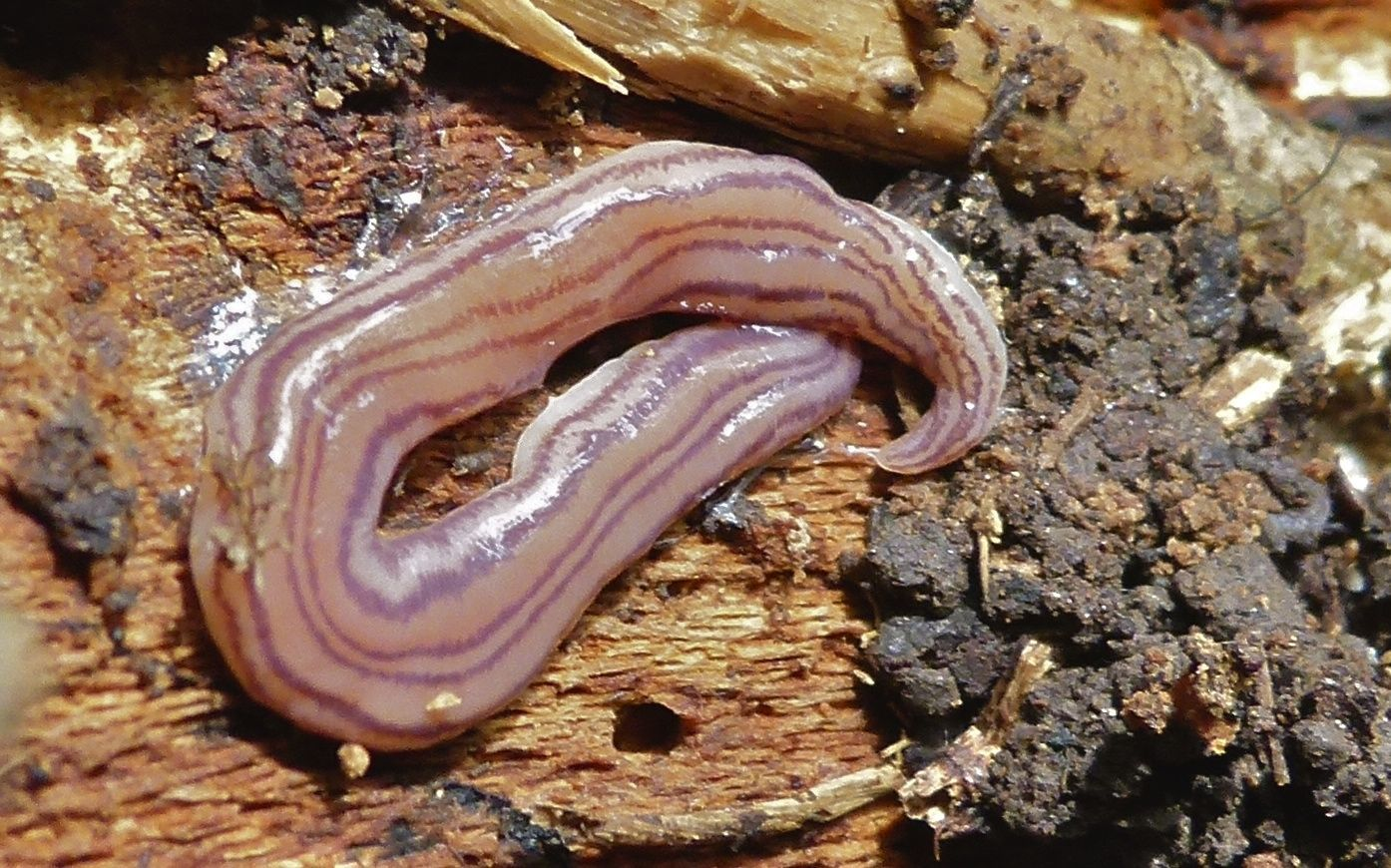
- Artioposthia glandulosa

Scientific classification
- Kingdom: Animalia
- Phylum: Platyhelminthes
- Order: Tricladida
- Family: Geoplanidae
- Tribe: Caenoplanini
- Genus: Artioposthia von Graff, 1896

Type species
- Geoplana fletcheri Dendy, 1891

= Artioposthia =

Genus of flatworms

Artioposthia is a genus of land planarians from the Australasian and Indo-Pacific countries. Several species have also been introduced in Europe.

== Description ==
Species of Artioposthia are characterized by a cylindrical pharynx and ovaries placed anteriorly to the male copulatory apparatus, close to the brain or to the pharynx. The copulatory apparatus has a series of paired glandular organs called adenodactyls.

Artioposthia is very similar to the closely related genus Arthurdendyus, the main difference being the position of the ovaries and the shape of the pharynx.

== Species ==
The genus Artioposthia includes the following species:

- Artioposthia adelaidensis (Dendy, 1892)
- Artioposthia civis Cardale, 1941
- Artioposthia diemenensis (Dendy, 1894)
- Artioposthia dovei (Steel, 1900)
- Artioposthia exulans (Dendy, 1901)
- Artioposthia fletcheri (Dendy, 1891)
- Artioposthia garveyi (Dendy, 1901)
- Artioposthia glandulosa Fyfe, 1956
- Artioposthia harrisoni Wood, 1926
- Artioposthia howesi (Dendy, 1901)
- Artioposthia japonica Kaburakki, 1922
- Artioposthia mariae (Dendy, 1895)
- Artioposthia polyadoides Fyfe, 1956
- Artioposthia subquadrangulata (Dendy, 1895)
- Artioposthia suteri (Dendy, 1897)
- Artioposthia warragulensis (Graff, 1899)
