= Alexander Greenlaw Hamilton =

Australian naturalist and teacher (1852–1941)

- Born: 14 April 1852; Bailieborough, Ireland
- Died: 21 October 1941 (aged 89); Chatswood, New South Wales, Australia
- Known for: Biology
- Spouse: Emma Thacker
- Scientific career
- Author abbrev. (botany): A.G.Ham.

Alexander Greenlaw Hamilton (14 April 1852 – 21 October 1941) was an Australian naturalist and teacher born in Ireland. A former president of the Linnean Society of New South Wales, he was known for his studies of desert plants and pollination as well as birds and terrestrial worms.

== Life ==
Hamilton was born in Bailieborough, Ireland, son of Alexander Greenlaw Hamilton and his wife Joyce, née Wynne. He was the half brother of John Wilson (philanthropist). The family migrated to New South Wales in 1866, around Hamilton's 14th birthday. In the same year, he succeeded in passing the examination demanded by the Education Department of New South Wales to teach in the country schools. However, he was considered too young to be placed in full charge of a school. As a result, his mother was recognised as the responsible agent of the school and young Hamilton as her assistant, although he was actually responsible for the whole instruction. The school was in Fish River Creek and later, in mid-1869, when the family moved to Meadow Flat, Hamilton was placed officially in charge of the school.

In February 1870, Hamilton was appointed temporary assistant at St. Mary's Church of England school, South Creek. In October he was sent to Guntawang Public School, near Gulgong and worked there for 17 years. On 14 April 1873, his 21st birthday, he married his wife Emma Thacker, who at the time was 18. During his time at Guntawang, he worked as a teacher and as a librarian at the local School of Arts that he helped to establish. He also studied the natural history of the area and raised many unusual pets, including birds, lizards, kangaroos and a platypus. In 1885, he joined the Linnean Society of New South Wales and published the first of many papers in the Society's Proceedings.

In October 1887, Hamilton became headmaster of the Mount Kembla Public School and started to study the ecology of the rainforest and to attend lectures at the University of Sydney. He also became more active in the societies with which he was associated. He was a council-member of the Linnean Society of New South Wales from 1906 to 1939 and president from 1915 to 1916. In 1913–1914 and 1920–1921 he was president of the Australian Naturalists' Society of New South Wales. Other societies of which he was a member included the Royal, Microscopical and Royal Zoological societies of New South Wales, the Wildlife Preservation Society of Australia, and the Gould League.

From 1902 on, after a visit to Western Australia, Hamilton started to promote a greater emphasis in the study of nature in primary school. He made this appeal at the Educational Conference of April 1904, and it induced the Department of Education to include the study of Nature in the primary schools of the state. In March 1905, he became headmaster of Willoughby Public School and a lecturer in nature study in Blackfriars and Hurlstone Training colleges. He was formally appointed to Teachers' College, Sydney, on 1 January 1907, but continued his dual job at least until May of that year, working six days a week. He was appointed senior lecturer in botany and nature study in 1919, but retired in 1920.

Hamilton "undoubtedly... played the most significant role in the establishment and development of pollination studies in Australia". During his career, Hamilton published many papers on pollination and plant fertilisation, morphology of xerophytic and carnivorous plants, as well as botanical and ornithological checklists. The standard author abbreviation A.G.Ham. is used to indicate this person as the author when citing a botanical name. In 1887 he also published a compilation on Australian land planarians, including the description of new species, with Joseph James Fletcher. He is commemorated in the names of several organisms, including the plants Drosera hamiltonii, Pterostylis hamiltonii, and Scaevola hamiltonii, the earthworm Spenceriella hamiltonii, and a subspecies of the southern cassowary, Casuarius casuarius hamiltoni.

Hamilton died at his home in Chastwood on 21 October 1941. He was cremated following Anglican rites.
