= Reproductive system of planarians =

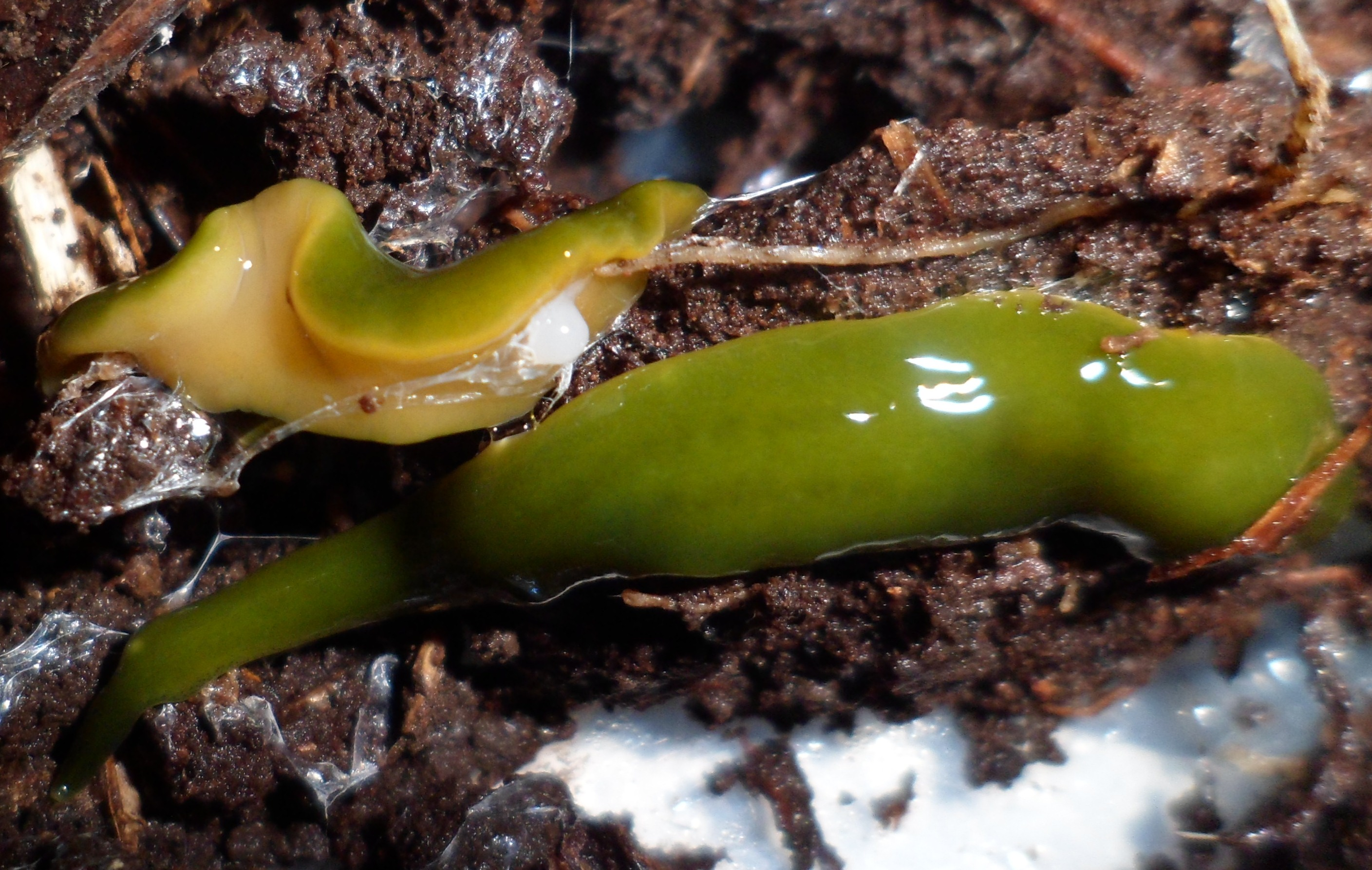
Two individuals of Obama ladislavii right after mating. The white structure seen in the upper animal is the protruded penis papilla.

The reproductive system of planarians is broadly similar among different families, although the associated structures can vary in complexity.

All planarians are hermaphrodites, so their reproductive system has a male and a female part. Both parts communicate with the surface of the body via a single opening called gonopore, which is located on the ventral side of the posterior half of the body.

== Male part of the reproductive system ==
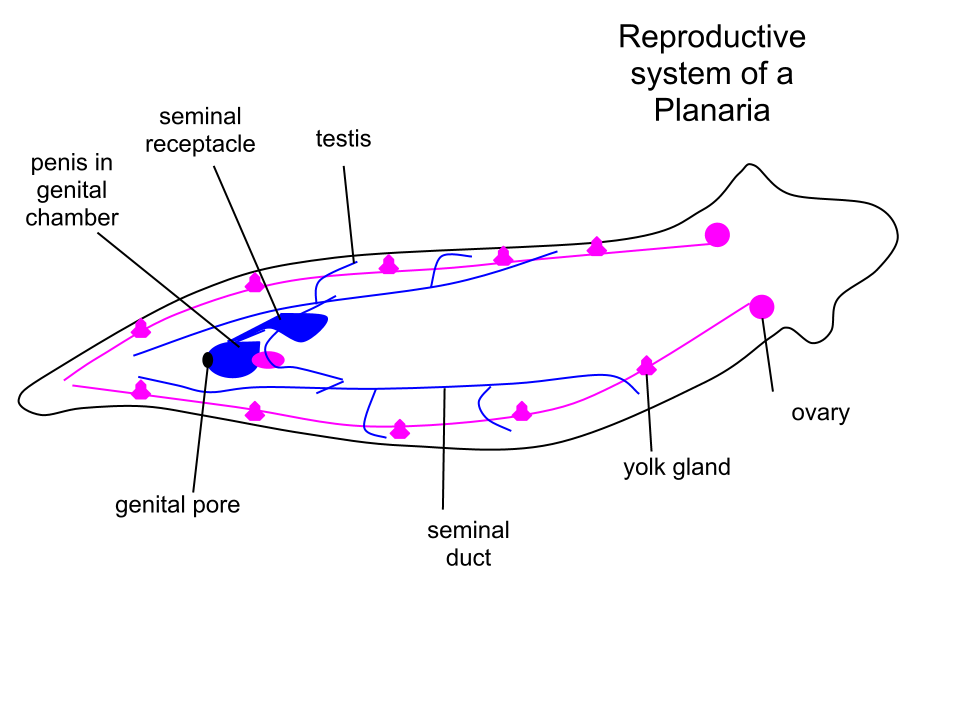
Scheme of the reproductive system of a freshwater planarian

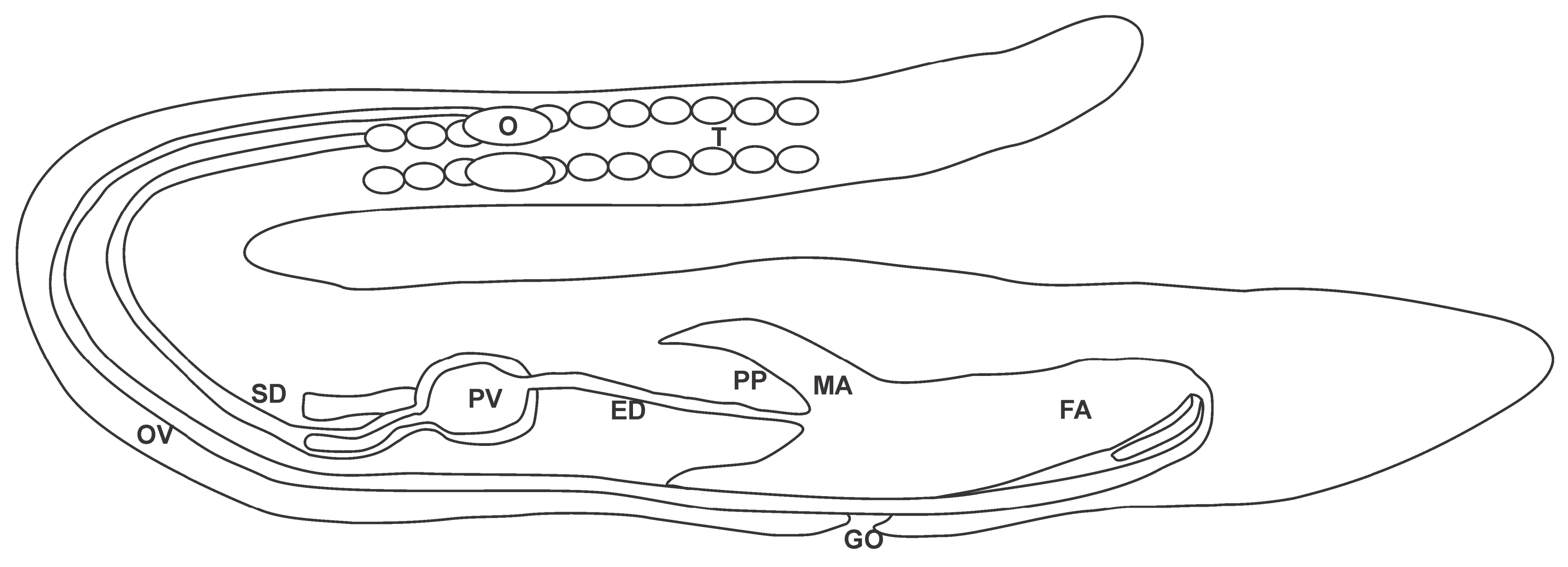
Simplified version of a planarian's reproductive system.

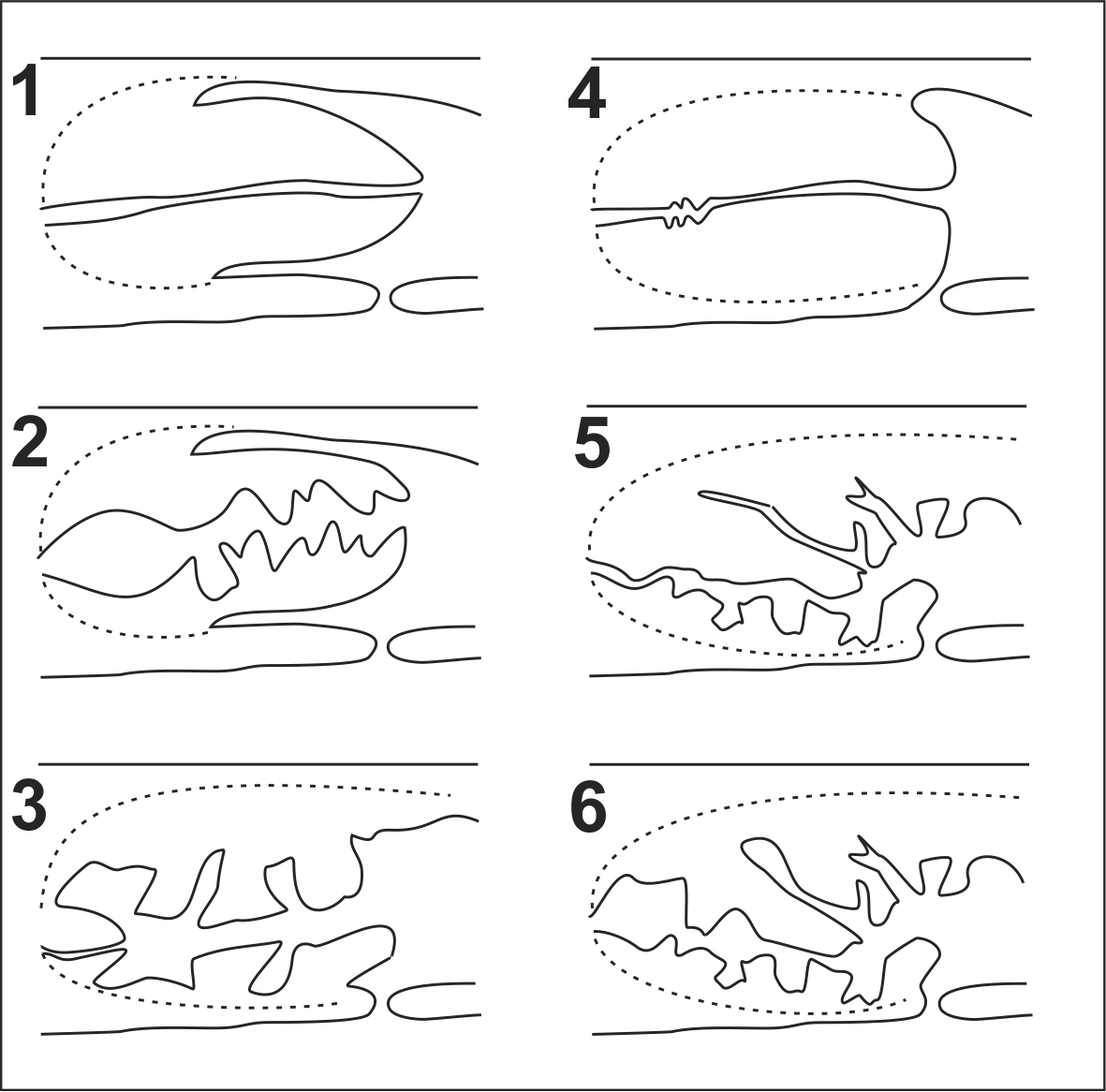
6 different types of penis found in land planarians: (1) permanent penis papilla, protrusible penis; (2) apparent penis papilla; (3) intra-antral penis papilla; (4) inverted penis; (5) absent penis papilla with ejaculatory duct; (6) absent penis papilla without ejaculatory duct.

The male part of the reproductive system in planarians has a set of several testicles, distributed throughout the body in two or more rows. They are usually concentrated in the anterior two thirds of the body, although they can reach close to the posterior end. The testicles are connected to a pair of sperm ducts which run posteriorly towards the gonopore.

In some groups, the sperm ducts met in their distal part, forming the ejaculatory duct, which then opens in a cavity called “male atrium”. In others, like land planarians, both open in the prostatic vesicle, a glandular organ which then runs posteriorly and opens in the male atrium, usually through an ejaculatory duct. The male atrium is located anteriorly to the gonopore.

Usually associated to the ejaculatory duct, there is a structure formed basically by a fold of the walls of the male atrium called “penis papilla”. The penis papilla is a permanent structure that occupies part or the whole male atrium and is protruded during copulation, thus also called a protrusible penis. In species without a penis papilla, the penis is formed only during copulation by a projection of the walls in the male atrium and called an eversible penis.

In land planarians, the structure of the male atrium may be quite variable between different genera. The most common constructions are:

- Permanent or true penis papilla: A big penis-like fold occupies the whole male atrium or most of it and is crossed by an ejaculatory duct. It is found in the genera Geoplana, Obama, Cratera, Paraba, Polycladus, Microplana, among others.
- Apparent penis papilla: Similar to a true penis papilla, but with a wide ejaculatory cavity instead of an ejaculatory duct. It is found in the genus Matuxia.
- Intra-antral penis papilla: A much smaller version of the true penis papilla, perceived as a small conical structure in the male atrium, which is mostly occupyed by irregular folds. It is found in the genera Amaga and Endeavouria, among others.
- Inverted penis: A structure that fills most of the male atrium, leaving a narrow canal connecting to the prostatic vesicle that resembles an ejaculatory duct. This canal, however, is pushed outwards during copulation, becoming the outer wall of the penis. It is found in the species Choeradoplana minima.
- Absent penis papilla: The male atrium lacks a permanent penis-like structure, i.e., contains an eversible penis, and is usually filled by irregular folds. An ejaculatory duct may be present (as in Pasipha, Imbira and Luteostriata) or not (as in Notogynaphallia).

== Female part of the reproductive system ==
The female part of the reproductive system in planarians is formed by two ovaries in the anterior region. Exiting the ovaries, a pair of oviducts (or, more precisely, ovovitelloducts) runs posteriorly towards the gonopore. A group of yolk glands also connects to these ducts, as planarians are neoophorans and thus yolk is not located inside the eggs.

Close to the gonopore, the ovovitelloducts reach a cavity called “female atrium”, which is located posteriorly to the gonopore. The ovovitelloducts may or not meet and become a single duct (common ovovitelloduct) before entering the female atrium. The distal part of the ovovitelloducts is usually sorrrounded by shell glands, which secrete the material that forms the shell of the eggcase (also called cocoon).

== Accessory structures ==
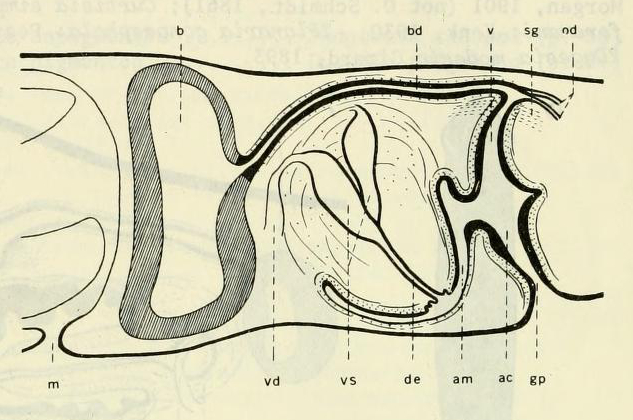
Reproductive system of Girardia tigrina. The large pouch-like structure on the left is the bursa copulatrix.

Among the accessory structures of the reproductive system of planarians, one usually found in freshwater and marine species is the bursa copulatrix, which has the function to store sperm after mating. Some planarians (such as the genera Planaria, Artioposthia, Arthurdendyus, Coleocephalus and Newzealandia) have a series of finger-like projections, called adenodactyls, near the male and female atria. Adenodactyls contain glands and produce several secretions believed to be useful during reproduction.
