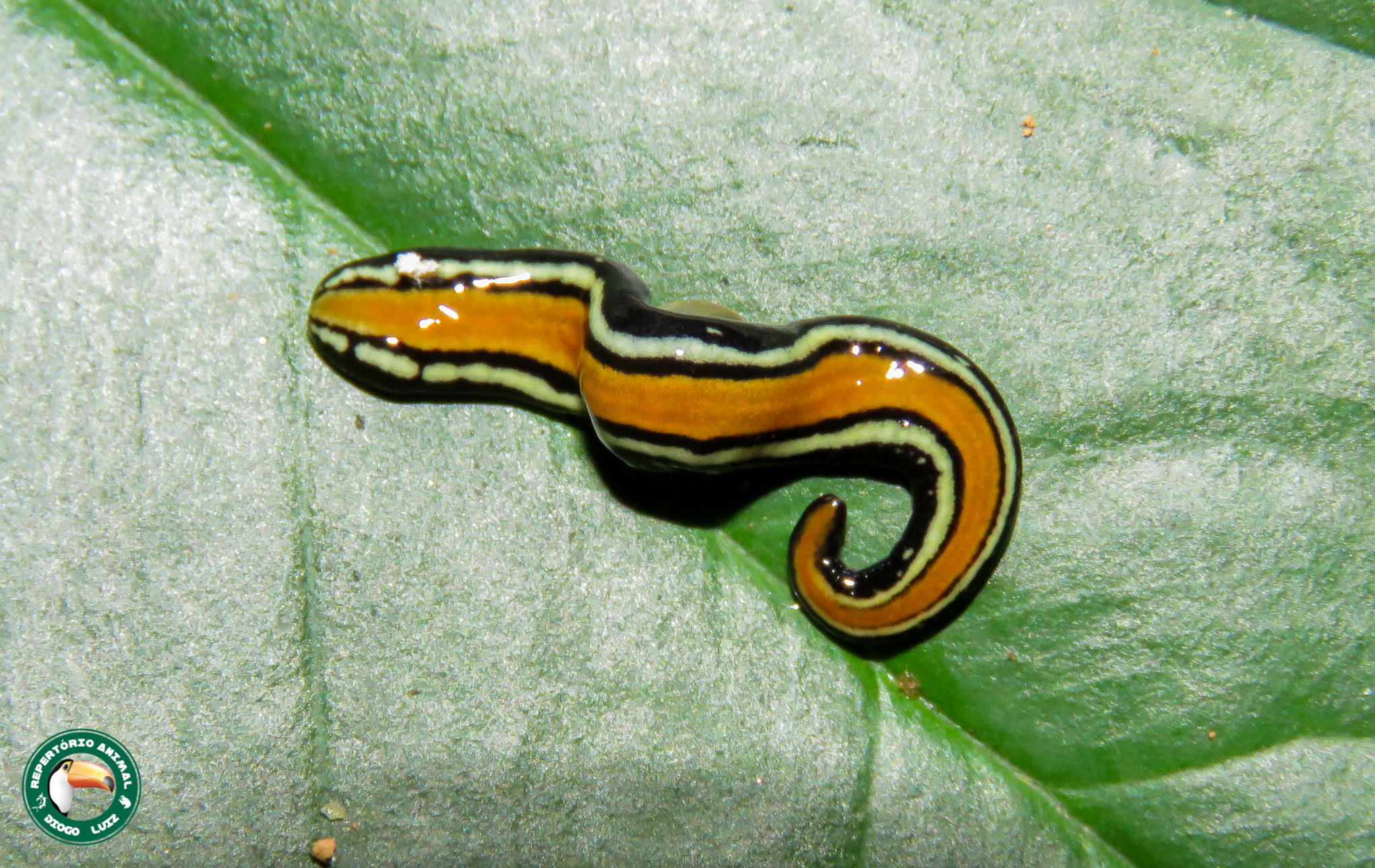
- Geoplana apua

Scientific classification
- Kingdom: Animalia
- Phylum: Platyhelminthes
- Order: Tricladida
- Family: Geoplanidae
- Subfamily: Geoplaninae
- Tribe: Geoplanini; Stimpson, 1857

Genera
- See text.

= Geoplanini =

Tribe of flatworms

Geoplanini is a tribe of land planarians in the subfamily Geoplaninae.

== Description ==
The tribe Geoplanini includes all genera of Geoplaninae that occur east of the Andes plus the Chilean genus Transandiplana. However, there are no currently known synapomorphies uniting these genera, and this group is supported solely on the basis of molecular analyses.

== Genera ==
The tribe Geoplanini contains 25 genera:

- Amaga Ogren & Kawakatsu, 1990
- Anophthalmoplana Negrete, Francavilla, Damborenea & Brusa, 2022
- Barreirana Ogren & Kawakatsu, 1990
- Cephaloflexa Carbayo & Leal-Zanchet, 2003
- Choeradoplanavon Graff, 1896
- Cratera Carbayo et al., 2013
- Difroehlichia Leal-Zanchet & Marques, 2018
- Geobia Diesing, 1861
- Geoplana Stimpson, 1857
- Gigantea Ogren & Kawakatsu, 1990
- Imbira Carbayo et al., 2013
- Issoca C. G. Froehlich, 1955
- Liana E. M. Froehlich, 1978
- Luteostriata Carbayo, 2010
- Matuxia Carbayo et al., 2013
- Notogynaphallia Ogren & Kawakatsu, 1990
- Obama Carbayo et al., 2013
- Paraba Carbayo et al., 2013
- Pasipha Ogren & Kawakatsu, 1990
- Piima Carbayo, 2020
- Pseudogeoplana Ogren & Kawakatsu, 1990
- Supramontana Carbayo & Leal-Zanchet, 2003
- Transandiplana Almeida & Carbayo, 2022
- Winsoria Negrete et al., 2019
- Xerapoa C. G. Froehlich, 1955
