= Sarcoplanini =

Scientific classification
- Kingdom: Animalia
- Phylum: Platyhelminthes
- Order: Tricladida
- Family: Geoplanidae
- Subfamily: Geoplaninae
- Tribe: Sarcoplanini; Almeida & Carbayo, 2022

Genera
- See text.

Tribe of flatworms

Sarcoplanini is a tribe of land planarians in the subfamily Geoplaninae.

== Description ==
The tribe Sarcoplanini includes genera of Geoplaninae that occur west of the Andes. They are characterized by the lack of the typical sensory pits that most land planarians have at the border of the anterior region. Instead of this, they have a series of sensory depressions, which are narrower but wider than sensory pits. Most genera also present a retractor muscle at the anterior region that is anatomically distinct from that found in some genera of the tribe Geoplanini. The copulatory apparatus has an extrabulbar prostatic vesicle and musculoglandular organs.

== Genera ==
The tribe Sarcoplanini contains five genera:

- Liana E. M. Froehlich, 1978
- Mapuplana Grau, Almeida, Sluys & Carbayo, 2012
- Pichidamas Bulnes, Grau & Carbayo, 2018
- Sarcoplana Almeida & Carbayo, 2022
- Wallmapuplana
