= Imbira flavonigra =

Scientific classification
- Kingdom: Animalia
- Phylum: Platyhelminthes
- Order: Tricladida
- Family: Geoplanidae
- Genus: Imbira
- Species: I. flavonigra

Binomial name
- Imbira flavonigra Amaral & Leal-Zanchet, 2018

Species of flatworm

Imbira flavonigra is a species of land planarian belonging to the subfamily Geoplaninae. It is known from specimens found in Brazil.

== Description ==
Imbira flavonigra is a flatworm that can reach up to 135 mm in length when crawling. The body is slender and flat with parallel margins, a rounded front tip, and a pointed back tip. It can be distinguished by its coloring; the dorsal side of the species has a yellow band running down the middle, flanked on either side by black bands. The base ground color of the dorsal side is grayish. The ventral side is a pale yellow color. The species' small eyes are arranged along the body margins.

It can additionally be distinguished from other members of Imbira via its internal anatomy; I. flavonigra has a short esophagus, a bell-shaped pharynx, and a long, fork-shaped, sinuous, tubular prostatic vesicle.

== Etymology ==
The specific epithet is derived from the Latin words flavus (yellow) and niger (black), in reference to the species' dorsal color.

== Description ==
Imbira flavonigra is only known from its type locality, within the municipality of Maquiné in Rio Grande do Sul, Brazil.
