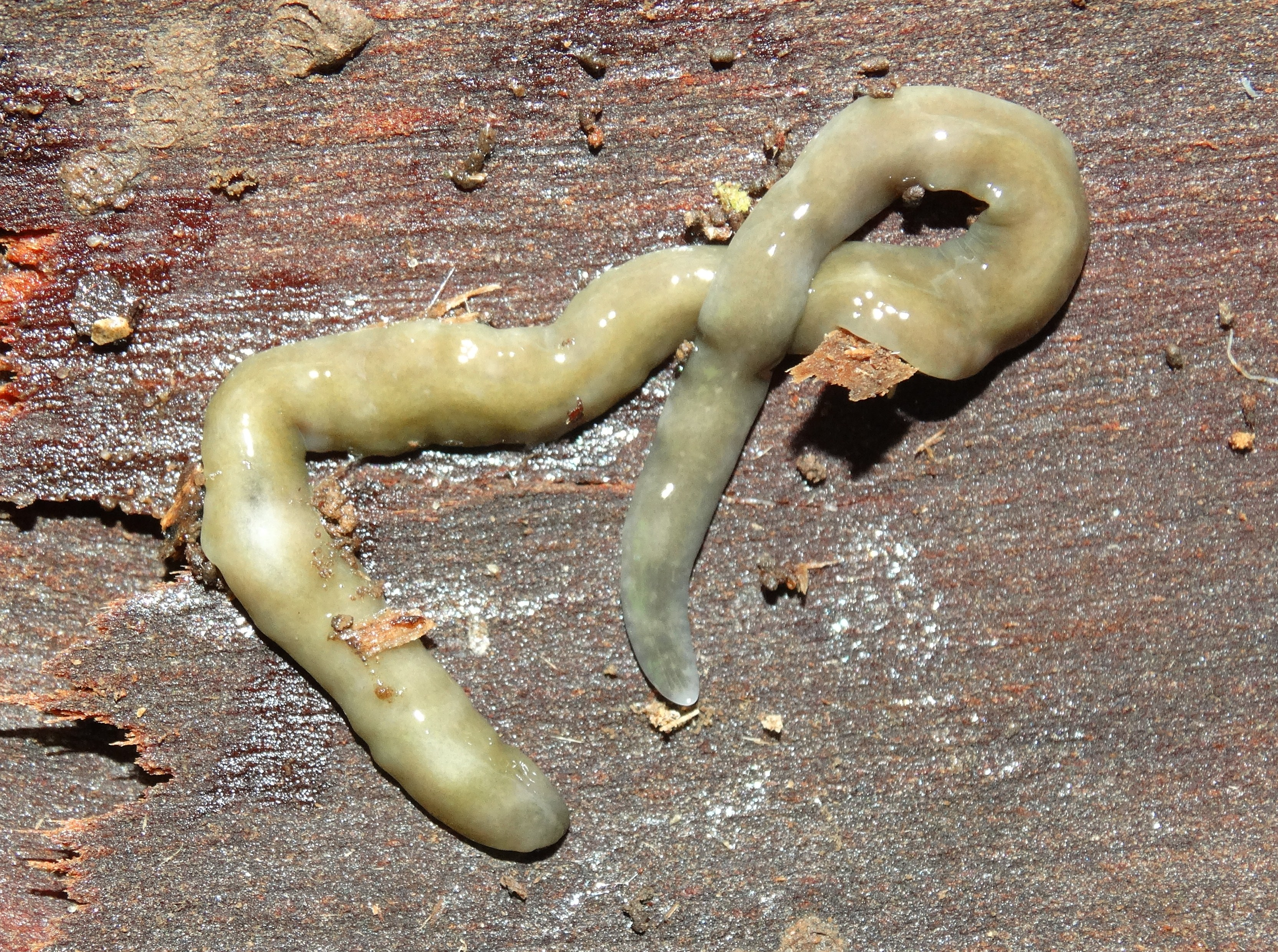

Scientific classification
- Kingdom: Animalia
- Phylum: Platyhelminthes
- Order: Tricladida
- Family: Geoplanidae
- Genus: Imbira
- Species: I. guaiana

Binomial name
- Imbira guaiana (Leal-Zanchet & Carbayo, 2001)

Synonyms
- Notogynaphallia guaiana Leal-Zanchet & Carbayo, 2001

= Imbira guaiana =

Species of flatworm

Imbira guaiana is a species of land planarian in the subfamily Geoplaninae. It is the type species of the genus Imbira and is found in Brazil.

== Description ==
Imbira guaiana is a medium-sized land planarian with an elongate body reaching up to 145 millimetres (5.7 in) in length and 3 millimetres (0.12 in) in width while crawling. Its dorsal surface has a greyish-olive color and the ventral side is yellowish-olive. The numerous small eyes are arranged long the body margins from the anterior to the posterior tip.

== Etymology ==
The specific epithet guaiana refers to the Kaingang people (also known as guainás or guaianos) that in the past inhabited the region where the species is found.

== Distribution ==
The only known place of occurrence of I. guaiana is the São Francisco de Paula National Forest in southern Brazil.
