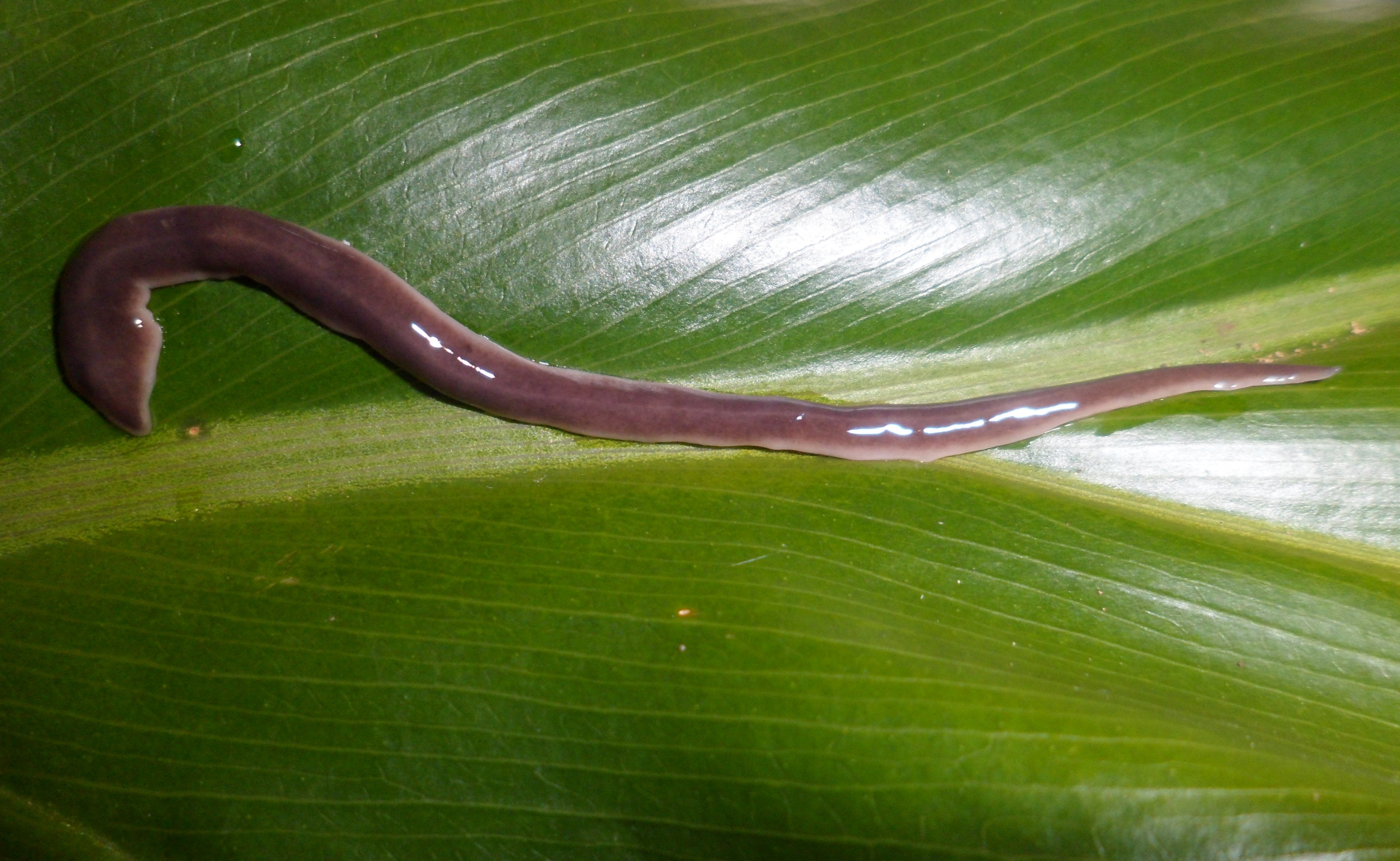

Scientific classification
- Kingdom: Animalia
- Phylum: Platyhelminthes
- Order: Tricladida
- Family: Geoplanidae
- Genus: Matuxia
- Species: M. tymbyra

Binomial name
- Matuxia tymbyra Rossi & Leal-Zanchet, 2019

= Matuxia tymbyra =

Species of flatworm

Matuxia tymbyra is a species of land planarian belonging to the subfamily Geoplaninae. It is found within Brazil.

== Description ==
Matuxia tymbyra has an elongated body with parallel margins, observed to reach about 88 mm in length. The anterior tip of the body is rounded, while the posterior is pointed. The dorsal side of the body is a dark grey color with lighter margins and a light grey thin midline running down the dorsum. The ventral side is light grey with a dark anterior tip. Its eyes lack clear halos.

No glandular margin is formed in the epidermis of the pre-pharyngeal region. The ovaries are pyramidal and lobated. The male atrium is almost entirely occupied by an asymmetrical, conical penis papilla; additionally, the male and female atria are separated by a dorsal fold.

== Etymology ==
The specific epithet of tymbyra is derived from the Tupi language, meaning "buried"; this is in reference to how the type specimens of M. tymbyra were found buried in soil.

== Distribution ==
Matuxia tymbyra is found within the state of Rio Grande do Sul, Brazil with type specimens being known from the São Francisco de Paula National Forest within the municipality of the same name.
