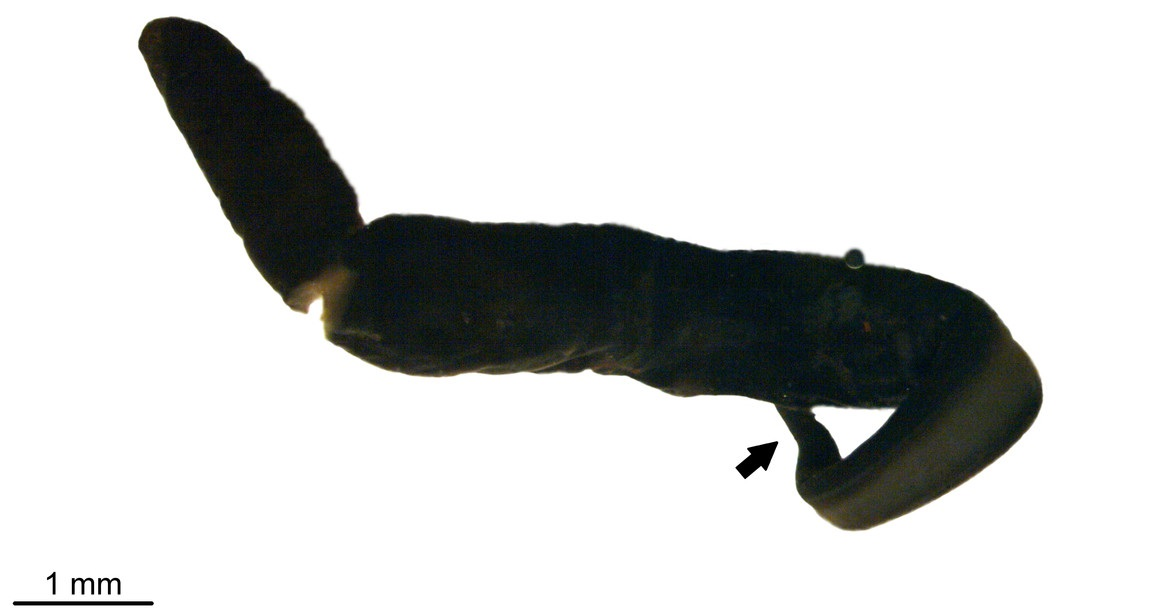

Scientific classification
- Kingdom: Animalia
- Phylum: Platyhelminthes
- Order: Tricladida
- Family: Geoplanidae
- Subfamily: Geoplaninae
- Genus: Difroehlichia; Leal-Zanchet & Marques, 2018
- Species: D. elenae

Binomial name
- Difroehlichia elenae Leal-Zanchet & Marques, 2018

= Difroehlichia =

Difroehlichia elenae

Genus of flatworms

Difroehlichia is a genus of land planarians from South America, currently comprising a single species, Difroehlichia elenae, which was found in a ferruginous cave in the municipality of Conceição do Mato Dentro, state of Minas Gerais, Brazil, which is part of the Cerrado biome.

== Description ==
Difroehlichia elenae is a small and slender land planarian. The only specimen known to the present measured 13.5 mm in length and 1.5 in width. It is distinguished from other species of the subfamily Geoplaninae by the poorly-developed subcutaneous musculature, an exception in the subfamily. The creeping sole is narrow, which is also rare within the subfamily, except for the genus Xerapoa.

The most remarkable feature of D. elenae is the presence of a secondary male copulatory apparatus, which is not completely developed in the holotype and only known specimen. Additional specimens are necessary to verify whether this secondary male apparatus is indeed a diagnostic feature of this species or simply an anomaly.

== Etymology ==
The name Difroehlichia honors the planarian researchers Claudio Gilberto Froehlich and Eudóxia Maria Froehlich, who made important contributions to the knowledge of Brazilian land planarians. The specific epithet elenae honors Dr. Elena Diehl, who studied ants and termites in southern Brazil.
