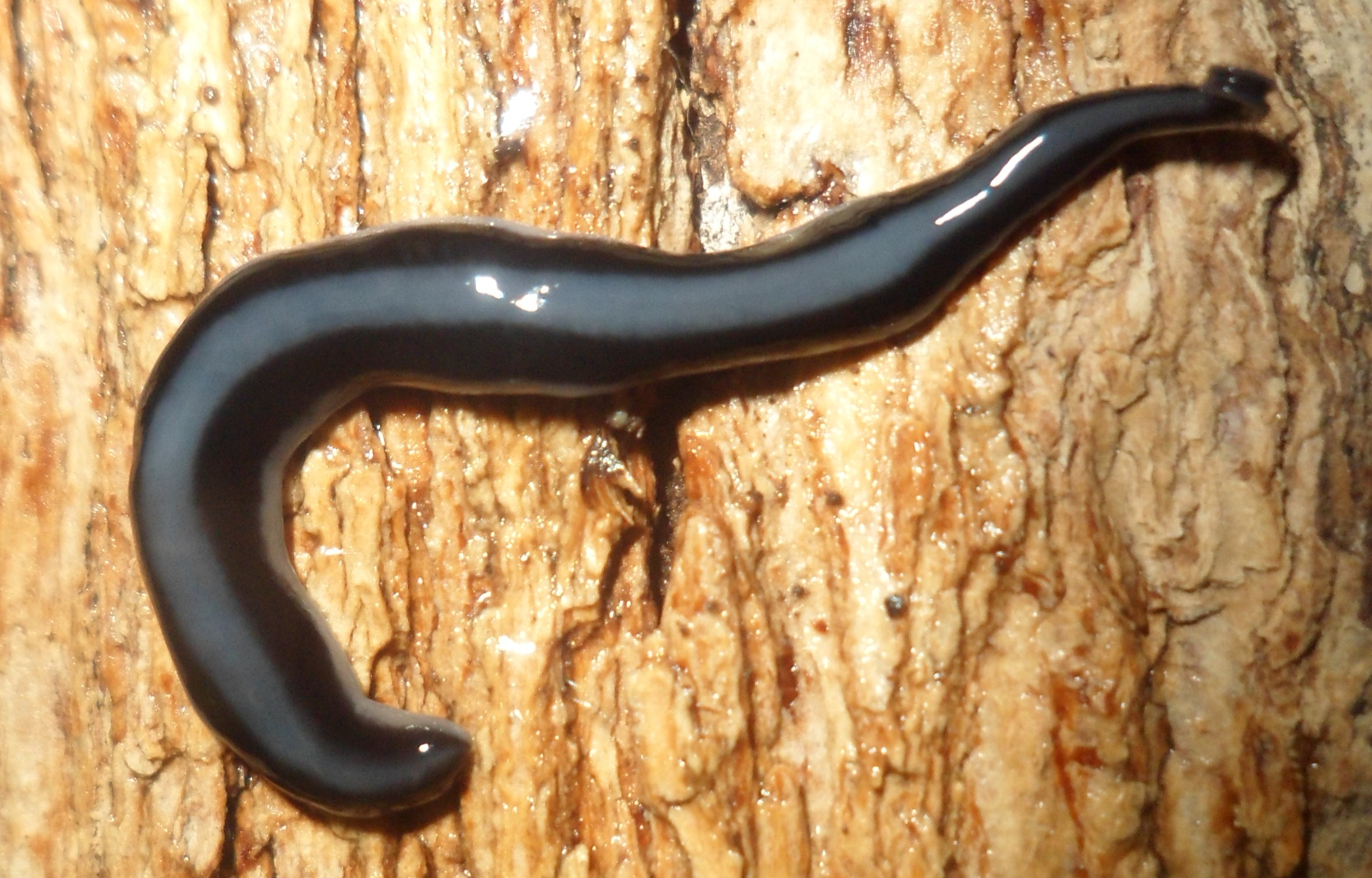
- Head on the top right

Scientific classification
- Kingdom: Animalia
- Phylum: Platyhelminthes
- Order: Tricladida
- Family: Geoplanidae
- Genus: Cephaloflexa
- Species: C. araucariana

Binomial name
- Cephaloflexa araucariana Carbayo & Leal-Zanchet, 2003

= Cephaloflexa araucariana =

Species of flatworm

Cephaloflexa araucariana is a species of land planarian in the subfamily Geoplaninae found in Brazil.

== Description ==
Cephaloflexa araucariana is a small to medium-sized land planarian up to 45 mm (1.8 in) in length when crawling. The dorsum is bluish-gray with two lateral black bands. The venter is dark gray, becoming black near the margins. The anterior end is narrow and rolled upwards by a retractor muscle.

The numerous eyes are distributed marginally along the whole body, except for the apex of the anterior end, where they are absent.

== Etymology ==
The specific epithet of araucariana is derived from the binomial name of Araucaria angustifolia, the Paraná pine, which is the most common tree of the region the species is found in.

== Distribution ==
The only known place of occurrence of C. araucariana is the São Francisco de Paula National Forest in southern Brazil.
