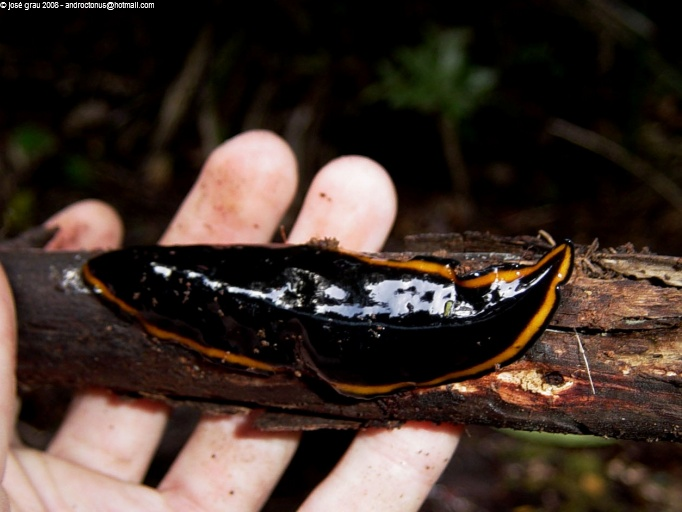
- Polycladus gayi

Scientific classification
- Kingdom: Animalia
- Phylum: Platyhelminthes
- Order: Tricladida
- Family: Geoplanidae
- Genus: Polycladus
- Species: P. gayi

Binomial name
- Polycladus gayi Blanchard, 1847

Synonyms
- Geoplana gayi Schultze & Müller, 1857

= Polycladus =

Genus of flatworms

Polycladus is a genus of land planarians from South America, currently comprising a single species, Polycladus gayi, which occurs in the Valdivian Forest, Chile.

== Description ==
Polycladus consists of land planarians with a wide, flat and leaf-like body. Its body width is about 40% of the body length, making it the land planarian genus with the widest body. Its eyes occur only marginally, which contrasts with most South American land planarian genera with wide bodies, in which eyes spread onto the dorsum. The entire ventral surface of the body is ciliated, and the mouth and gonopore are posteriorly shifted in relation to other land planarians.

Regarding the body musculature, besides the typical muscle layers found in most Geoplaninid genera, Polycladus has an additional subneural layer of transverse fibers and a transneural layer of longitudinal fibers, which crosses the ventral nerve plate and intermingles with the subintestinal and subneural transverse layers. The copulatory apparatus of Polycladus has a well-developed permanent penis and the female canal enters the genital antrum dorsally. This definition, however, is incomplete regarding all anatomical structures currently considered in the definition of planarian genera.

== Diet ==
Polycladus is known to feed on gastropods, including both native species, such as the black snail, Macrocyclis peruvianus, and introduced species, such as the invasive slug Limax maximus.

== Etymology ==
The name Polycladus comes from Greek πολύ (many) + κλάδος (branch), referring to the branched intestine. Despite the name, Polycladus is not a species of the flatworm order Polycladida, but rather of Tricladida.

The specific epithet of the type-species, gayi, commemorates French naturalist Claude Gay.
