= Gusana (flatworm) =

Scientific classification
- Kingdom: Animalia
- Phylum: Platyhelminthes
- Order: Tricladida
- Family: Geoplanidae
- Subfamily: Geoplaninae
- Tribe: Gusanini; Almeida & Carbayo, 2023
- Genus: Gusana; Froehlich, 1978

Type species
- Geoplana cruciata von Graff, 1899

Genus of flatworms

Gusana is a genus of land planarians found in Chile.

== Description ==
Gusana was defined as land planarians with a broad, leaf-like body that tapers very abruptly anteriorly, giving it a triangular anterior end. The cutaneous musculature, both ventrally and dorsally, is partially sunk into the mesenchyma. The sensory border forms a thick edge around the ventral margin of the anterior end and the sensory pits are internally branched, differently from what occurs in most Neotropical land planarians. The copulatory apparatus has a small intra-antral penis papilla and the female canal enters the genital antrum ventrally.

== Species ==
The genus Gusana currently includes seven species:

- Gusana cruciata (von Graff, 1899)
- Gusana hualpensis Carbayo, 2022
- Gusana lata (von Graff, 1899)
- Gusana lujanae Almeida & Carbayo, 2022
- Gusana melipeucensis Almeida & Carbayo, 2022
- Gusana platei (von Graff, 1899)
- Gusana purensis Bolonhezi, Almeida & Carbayo, 2022
