= Adinoplana =

Scientific classification
- Kingdom: Animalia
- Phylum: Platyhelminthes
- Order: Tricladida
- Family: Geoplanidae
- Tribe: Adinoplanini; Almeida & Carbayo,2022
- Genus: Adinoplana; Almeida & Carbayo,2022
- Species: A. alerna

Binomial name
- Adinoplana alerna Almeida & Carbayo,2022

Genus of flatworms

Adinoplana is a genus of land planarian, and the sole member of the tribe Adinoplanini. It contains one species, Adinoplana alerna.

== Etymology ==
The genus name, and by extension the tribe name, is derived from the Ancient Greek ἁδινός (adinos), meaning "crowded," in reference to the numerous musculoglandular organs, and the Latin plana, "flat," referring to the body shape.

The specific epithet of alerna is an abbreviated anagram derived from Alerce Andino National Park.
