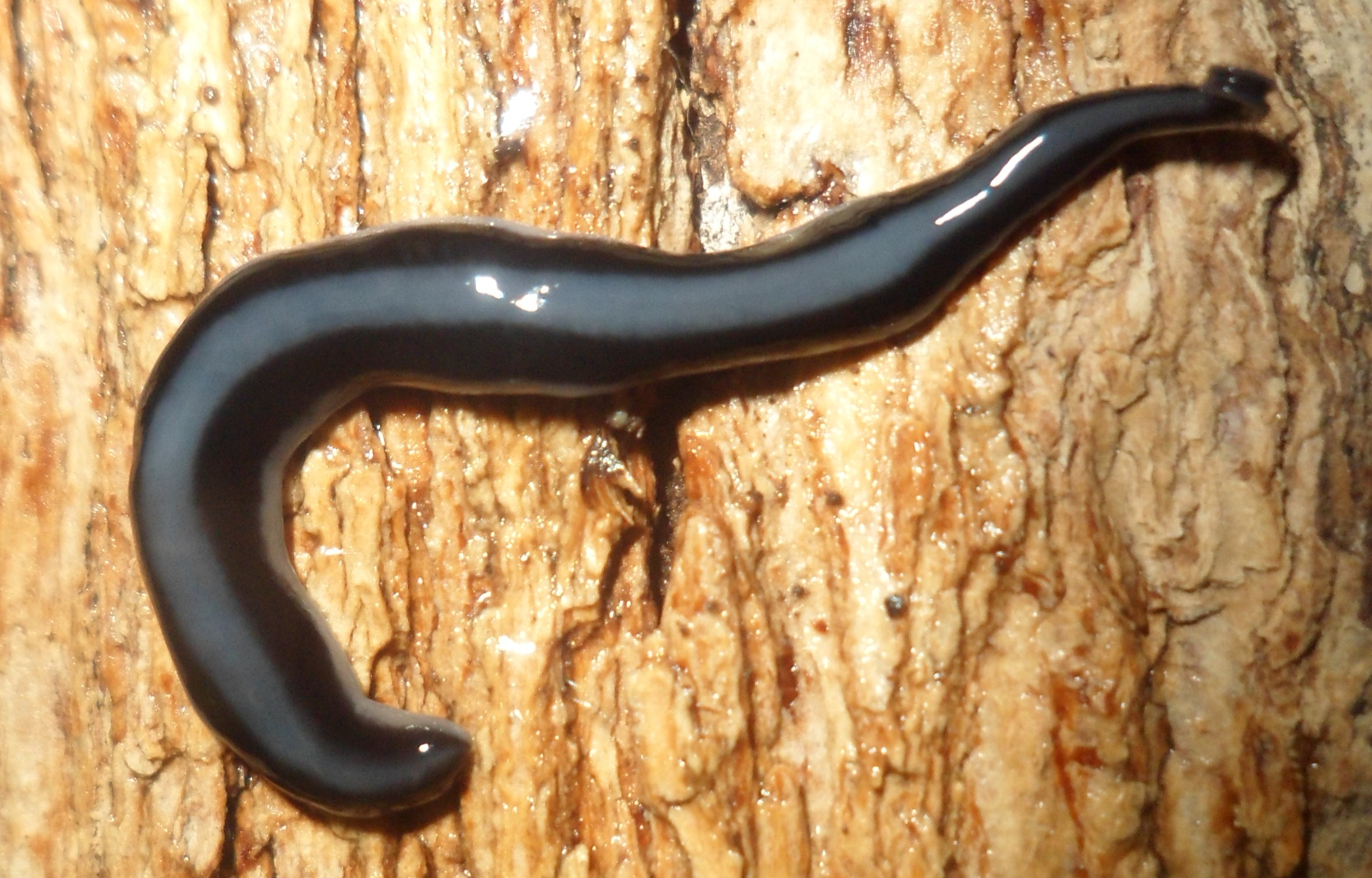
- Cephaloflexa araucariana

Scientific classification
- Kingdom: Animalia
- Phylum: Platyhelminthes
- Order: Tricladida
- Family: Geoplanidae
- Subfamily: Geoplaninae
- Genus: Cephaloflexa; Carbayo & Leal-Zanchet, 2003

Type species
- Geoplana bergi Graff, 1899

= Cephaloflexa =

Genus of flatworms

Cephaloflexa is a genus of land planarians from Brazil.

== Description ==
The genus Cephaloflexa is characterized by the presence of a cephalic retractor muscle not associated with cephalic glands. Due to this muscle, the head in species of Cephaloflexa is rolled upwards or backwards similarly to Choeradoplana. The main external feature to distinguish Cephaloflexa from Choeradoplana is the presence of two “cushions” on the ventral side of the head of the latter. The copulatory apparatus of Cephaloflexa lacks a permanent penis papilla.

== Etymology ==
The name Cephaloflexa comes from the Greek word κεφαλή (head) and the Latin word flexus (bending).

== Species ==
There are three described species in the genus Cephaloflexa:

- Cephaloflexa araucariana Carbayo & Leal-Zanchet, 2003
- Cephaloflexa bergi (Graff, 1899)
- Cephaloflexa nataliae (Froehlich, 1959)
