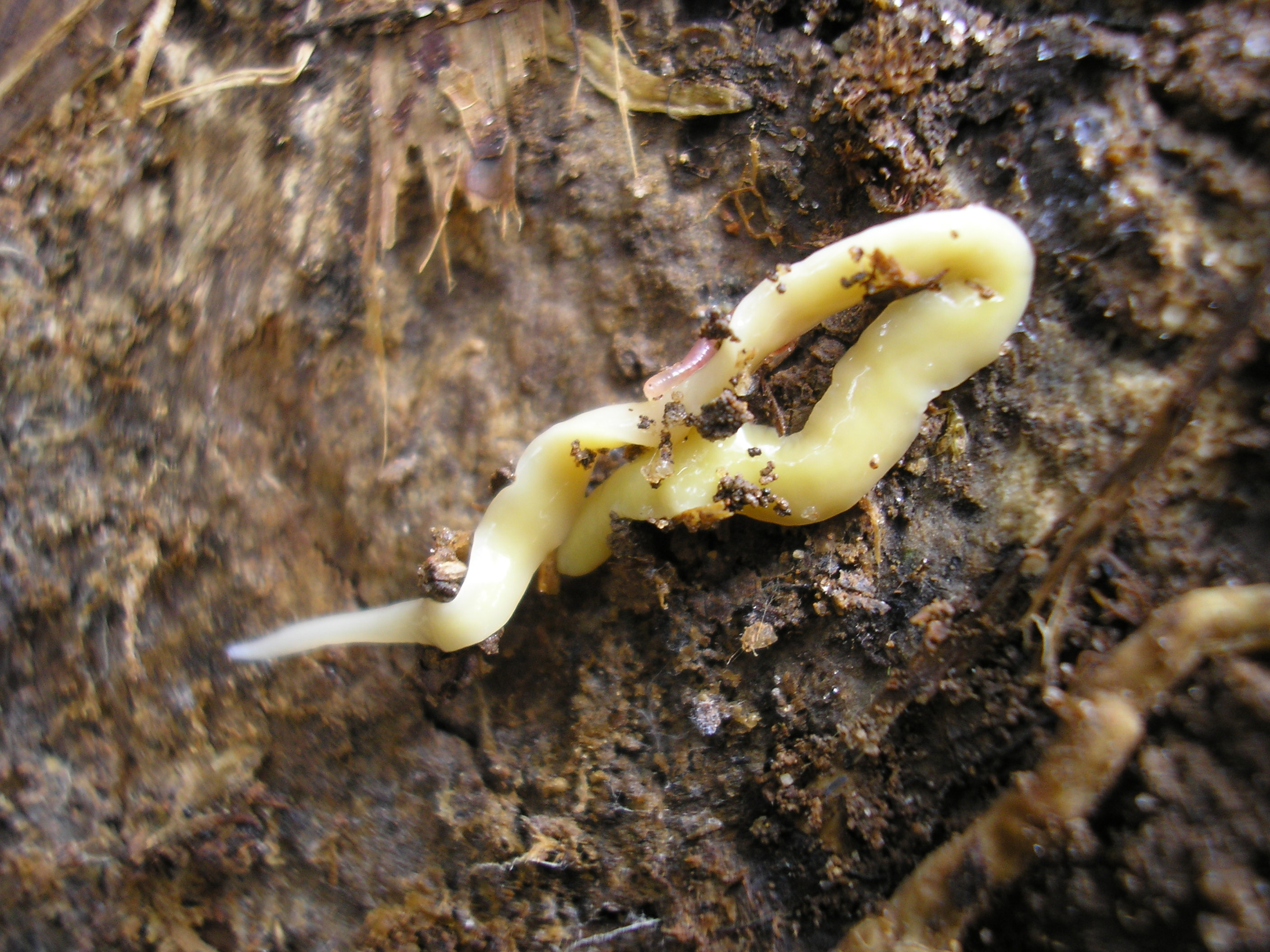

Scientific classification
- Kingdom: Animalia
- Phylum: Platyhelminthes
- Order: Tricladida
- Family: Geoplanidae
- Subfamily: Geoplaninae
- Genus: Geobia; Diesing, 1861
- Species: G. subterranea

Binomial name
- Geobia subterranea (Schultze & Müller, 1857)

Synonyms
- Geoplana subterranea Schultze & Müller, 1857

= Geobia =

Geobia subterranea

Genus of flatworms

Geobia is a monotypic genus of land planarians from South America.

== Description ==
The genus Geobia has a very elongated body. The only species in the genus, Geobia subterranea, has several adaptations for a subterranean lifestyle, such as lack of eyes, pigments, and creeping sole, i.e., the ventral side has only some sparse cilia, unlike most other genera. The cutaneous musculature is very strong, especially in the anterior region, possibly as an adaptation due to its burrowing habits.

The copulatory apparatus of Geobia has a permanent but small penis and an elongated prostatic vesicle. The female canal enters the genital antrum dorsally.

== Distribution and ecology ==
Geobia subterranea is found in areas covered by the Atlantic Rainforest in Brazil. Its known distribution includes the states of Rio de Janeiro, São Paulo and Santa Catarina.

It is known to feed on earthworms, attaching its body to the prey and sucking the contents after releasing digestive enzymes. The planarian's colorless body usually acquires a brownish or pinkish tinge after a meal due to the gut contents.
