= Piima =

Scientific classification
- Kingdom: Animalia
- Phylum: Platyhelminthes
- Order: Tricladida
- Family: Geoplanidae
- Genus: Piima
- Species: P. ata

Binomial name
- Piima ata Carbayo, 2020

Genus of flatworms

Piima is a genus of land planarians belonging to the subfamily Geoplaninae. It is monotypic, containing the sole species Piima ata. It is found in Brazil.

== Description ==
Members of the genus Piima have a small to medium-sized slender, sub-cylindrical body with parallel margins and rounded extremities. The entire cephalic region is surrounded by eyes and sensory pits; the eyes are monolobate. The prostatic vesicle is extrabulbar and muscularized, and the penis papilla is horizontal and cylindrical. The distal half of the male atrium has large folds. A genital cavity connects the common glandular ovovitelline duct and the female atrium; the female atrium is long and well muscularized.

Piima ata has a black dorsum; the front of the body has a median black band separated from the black margins by a whitish area. A median white band runs down most of the dorsum. Large white dots that occasionally merge with each other are present on the dorsum. The ventral side of the body is white. Additionally, P. ata has a long copulatory apparatus, a finger-shaped penis papilla, and very thick, strong muscularis on the prostatic vesicle and female atrium.

== Etymology ==
The generic name Piima is derived from the Tupi language words pii and maa, literally meaning "slender animal", in reference to the body shape of the type species.

The specific epithet of ata is derived from the Tupi word atã, meaning "strong". This is in reference to the very thick muscle of the species' prostatic vesicle.

== Distribution ==
P. ata is only known from the type locality of Serra da Bocaina National Park, São José do Barreiro, São Paulo, Brazil.
