= Timyma =

Scientific classification
- Kingdom: Animalia
- Phylum: Platyhelminthes
- Order: Tricladida
- Family: Geoplanidae
- Tribe: Timymini
- Genus: Timyma; E. M. Froehlich, 1978

Genus of flatworms

Timyma is a genus of land planarians from Chile. It is the sole genus of the subfamily Timyminae.

== Description ==
The genus Timyma includes planarians of elongate body and spatula-like anterior end. Although most land planarians native from South America have dorsal testes, Timyma has ventral testes, which at first suggested that it is related to the Australasia species of the tribe Caenoplanini. However, the longitudinal cutaneous musculature of Timyma is very weak, differently from other genera in this tribe. However, molecular studies confirmed that it is more closely related to other land planarians in South America, having a sister-group relationship with the subfamily Geoplaninae. The copulatory apparatus lacks adenodactyls and a permanent penis papilla.

== Species ==
There are currently two species recognised in the genus Timyma:

- Timyma juliae Froehlich, 1978
- Timyma olmuensis Almeida & Carbayo, 2021
