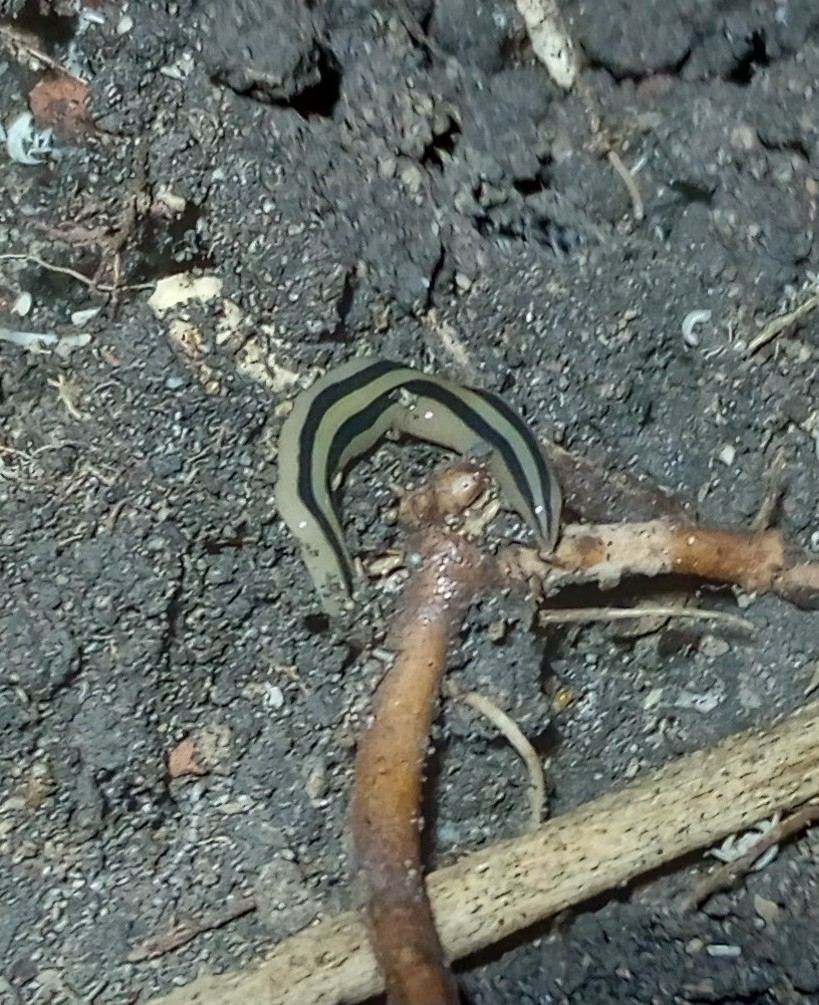

Scientific classification
- Kingdom: Animalia
- Phylum: Platyhelminthes
- Order: Tricladida
- Family: Geoplanidae
- Genus: Winsoria
- Species: W. bipatria

Binomial name
- Winsoria bipatria Negrete et al., 2020

= Winsoria =

Genus of flatworms

Winsoria is a genus of land planarian belonging to the family Geoplaninae. It is monotypic, containing the sole species Winsoria bipatria. It is found in Argentina and Brazil.

== Description ==
The genus Winsoria is distinguished from others of family Geoplaninae by the presence of a cephalic retractor muscle and a subneural parenchymal muscle layer that extends behind the ovaries. Additionally, it is distinguished by the presence of a protrusible penis and a long ovovitelline duct.

W. bipatria can reach up to 50 mm in length. On the dorsum, there is a light yellow median band flanked by two black paramedian bands, which are in turn bordered by pastel yellow lateral bands. The ventral side of the body is yellowish on the front tip and body margins, and whitish on the creeping sole. Additionally, the species lacks a glandular margin and has a cylindrical pharynx.

== Etymology ==
The generic name of Winsoria was given in honor of turbellariologist Leigh Winsor, "for his immense contribution to the systematics, biogeography and functional anatomy of land flatworms". The specific epithet is derived from the Latin bi and patria, meaning "two countries", in reference to the species being found in both Argentina and Brazil.
