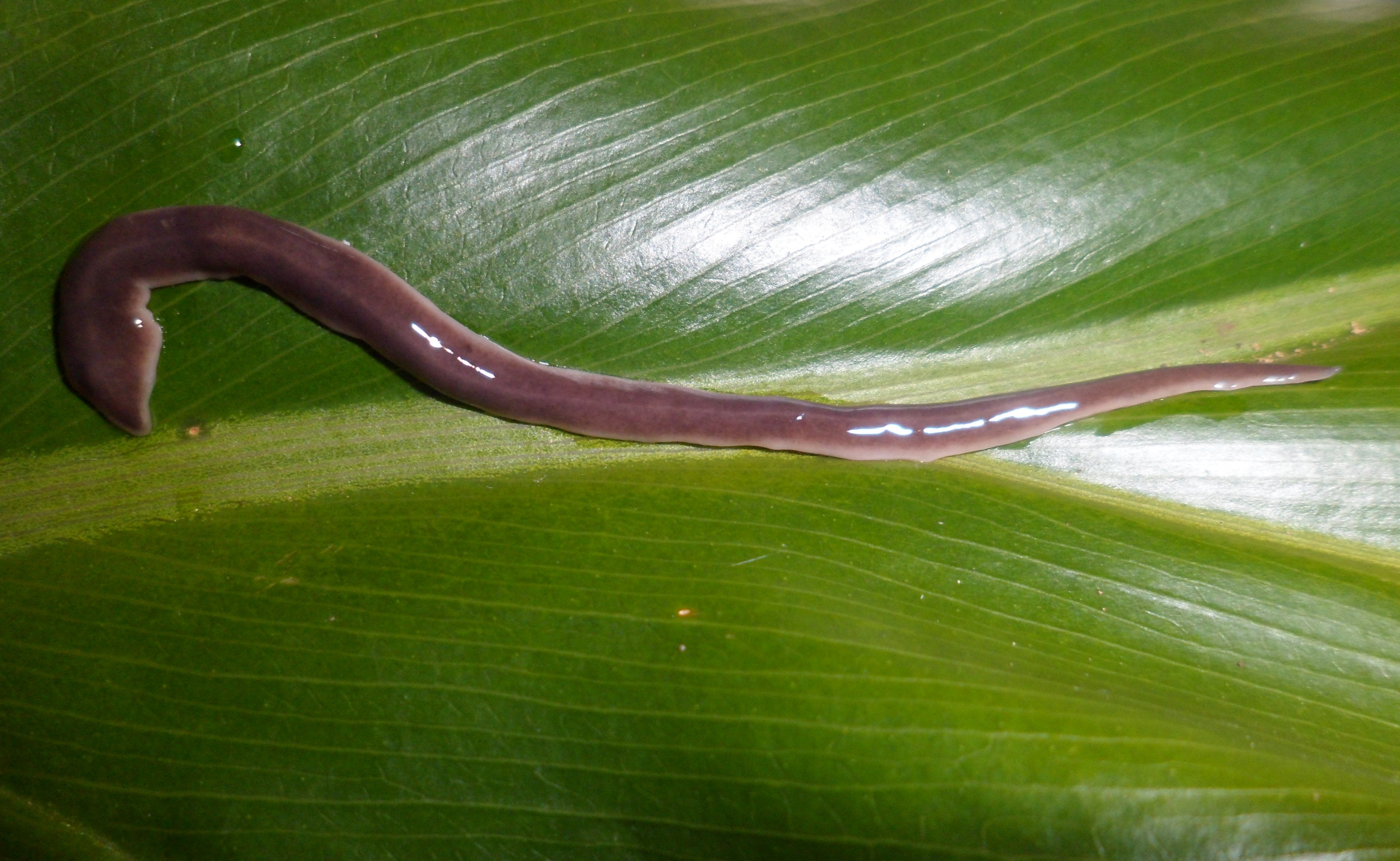
- Matuxia tymbyra

Scientific classification
- Kingdom: Animalia
- Phylum: Platyhelminthes
- Order: Tricladida
- Family: Geoplanidae
- Subfamily: Geoplaninae
- Genus: Matuxia; Carbayo et al., 2013

Type species
- Geoplana tuxaua E. M. Froehlich, 1955

= Matuxia =

Genus of flatworms

Matuxia is a genus of land planarians from Brazil.

== Description ==
The genus Matuxia is characterized by having a slender body with nearly parallel margins, reaching up to 12 cm in length, and being slightly convex on both dorsal and ventral sides. The eyes are arranged along the body margins, not occupying the dorsum. The copulatory apparatus has an apparent penis papilla, a structure similar to a true penis papilla, but having an ejaculatory cavity instead of an ejaculatory duct. The female cavity is rounded and filled with a multilayered epithelium.

== Etymology ==
Matuxia is a portmanteau of the specific epithets of the two first species of the genus to be described, matuta and tuxaua, and the first name of Eudóxia Maria Froehlich, who described both M. matuta and M. tuxaua.

== Species ==
There are three species assigned to the genus Matuxia:

- Matuxia matuta (E. M. Froehlich, 1955)
- Matuxia tuxaua (E. M. Froehlich, 1955)
- Matuxia tymbyra Rossi & Leal-Zanchet, 2019
