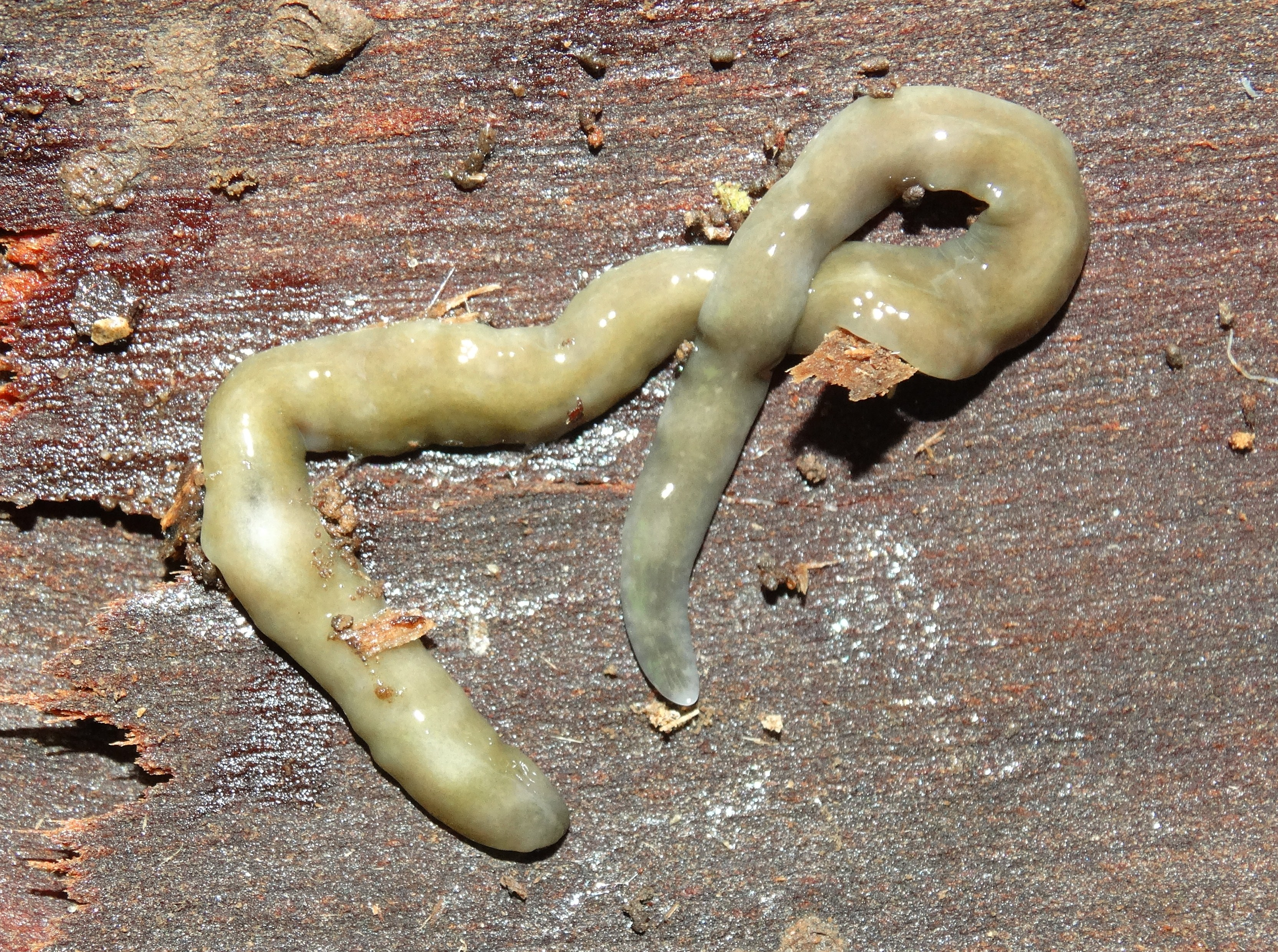
- Imbira guaiana

Scientific classification
- Kingdom: Animalia
- Phylum: Platyhelminthes
- Order: Tricladida
- Family: Geoplanidae
- Subfamily: Geoplaninae
- Genus: Imbira; Carbayo et al., 2013

Type species
- Notogynaphallia guaiana Leal-Zanchet & Carbayo, 2001

= Imbira =

Genus of flatworms

Imbira is a genus of land planarians found in South America.

== Description ==
The genus Imibira is characterized by having a large, slender and flat body with parallel margins, reaching up to 14 cm in length. The eyes are arranged along the body margins, not occupying the dorsum. In comparison to other genera, the body has an additional layer of longitudinal muscles dorsally and ventrally to the intestine. The copulatory apparatus lacks a permanent penis, i. e., the penis is formed during copulation by folds in the male cavity. The female cavity is rounded and filled with a multilayered epithelium.

== Etymology ==
Imbira is a word in the Tupi language that refers to a strip of bark peeled off from certain trees.

== Species ==
There are four species assigned to the genus Imbira:

- Imbira flavonigra Amaral & Leal-Zanchet, 2018
- Imbira guaiana (Leal-Zanchet & Carbayo, 2001)
- Imbira marcusi Carbayo et al., 2013
- Imbira negrita Negrete & Brusa, 2017
