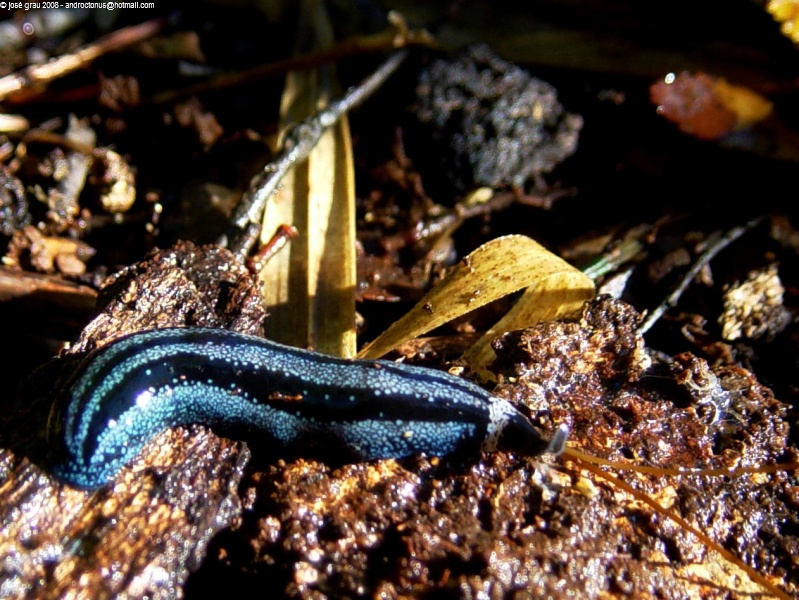
- Pseudogeoplana reticulata

Scientific classification
- Kingdom: Animalia
- Phylum: Platyhelminthes
- Order: Tricladida
- Family: Geoplanidae
- Subfamily: Geoplaninae
- Genus: Pseudogeoplana; Ogren & Kawakatsu, 1990

= Pseudogeoplana =

Genus of flatworms

Pseudogeoplana is a genus of land planarians of the subfamily Geoplaninae. It was erected to include species lacking sufficient morphological information to allow them to be classified in the appropriate genus.

== Taxonomy ==
Many land planarian species described during the second half of the 19th century and the first half of the 20th century were classified based solely on external characters. Currently, the land planarian genera are highly based on their internal anatomy, especially the anatomy of the copulatory apparatus. As a result, species with old descriptions that were never redescribed, so that their internal anatomy remains unknown, cannot be assigned to the correct genus. Thus, the genus Pseudogeoplana was erected to temporarily accommodate species of the subfamily Geoplaninae whose anatomy of the copulatory apparatus is still unknown.

== Species ==
The genus Pseudogeoplana currently contains the following species:

- Pseudogeoplana aevipandemiae Lago-Barcia & Carbayo, 2021
- Pseudogeoplana albopunctata (von Graff, 1899)
- Pseudogeoplana andicola (Schmarda, 1859)
- Pseudogeoplana arpi (Schirch, 1929)
- Pseudogeoplana atropurpurea (Riester, 1938)
- Pseudogeoplana bilinearis (Darwin, 1844)
- Pseudogeoplana bilineata (Fuhrmann, 1912)
- Pseudogeoplana blanchardi (von Graff, 1899)
- Pseudogeoplana blaseri (Schirch, 1929)
- Pseudogeoplana bohlsi (von Graff, 1899)
- Pseudogeoplana bonita (Schirch, 1929)
- Pseudogeoplana brasiliensis (Blainville, 1826)
- Pseudogeoplana bresslaui (Schirch, 1929)
- Pseudogeoplana brittlebanki (von Graff, 1897)
- Pseudogeoplana burri (Riester, 1938)
- Pseudogeoplana cardosi (Schirch, 1929)
- Pseudogeoplana collini (von Graff, 1899)
- Pseudogeoplana columbiana (Fuhrmann, 1912)
- Pseudogeoplana distincta (von Graff, 1899)
- Pseudogeoplana doederleni (Schirch, 1929)
- Pseudogeoplana ehlersi (von Graff, 1899)
- Pseudogeoplana elegans (Darwin, 1844)
- Pseudogeoplana elongata (Darwin, 1844)
- Pseudogeoplana eugeniae (von Graff, 1897)
- Pseudogeoplana flava (Moseley, 1877)
- Pseudogeoplana goeldii (von Graff, 1899)
- Pseudogeoplana gollmeri (von Graff, 1899)
- Pseudogeoplana gonzalezi (Fuhrmann, 1912)
- Pseudogeoplana halbani (von Graff, 1899)
- Pseudogeoplana lumbricoides (Schirch, 1929)
- Pseudogeoplana maculata (Darwin, 1844)
- Pseudogeoplana marginata (Müller, 1856)
- Pseudogeoplana maximiliani (Schultze & Müller, 1857)
- Pseudogeoplana meyerhansi (Fuhrmann, 1912)
- Pseudogeoplana nephelis (Schultze & Müller, 1857)
- Pseudogeoplana nigrocephala (Fuhrmann, 1912)
- Pseudogeoplana nigrofusca (Darwin, 1844)
- Pseudogeoplana nobilis (von Graff, 1899)
- Pseudogeoplana obscura (Schirch, 1929)
- Pseudogeoplana octolineata (Schirch, 1929)
- Pseudogeoplana oerstedi (von Graff, 1899)
- Pseudogeoplana pallida (Darwin, 1844)
- Pseudogeoplana panamensis (Hyman, 1941)
- Pseudogeoplana pardalina (von Graff, 1899)
- Pseudogeoplana pavonina (Riester, 1938)
- Pseudogeoplana perspicillata (von Graff, 1899)
- Pseudogeoplana pulla (Darwin, 1844)
- Pseudogeoplana reticulata (von Graff, 1899)
- Pseudogeoplana riedeli (Schirch, 1929)
- Pseudogeoplana rosenbergi (Meixner, 1906)
- Pseudogeoplana rostrata (von Graff, 1899)
- Pseudogeoplana sagittata (von Graff, 1899)
- Pseudogeoplana schirchi Ogren & Kawakatsu, 1990
- Pseudogeoplana semilineata (Darwin, 1844)
- Pseudogeoplana stolli (von Graff, 1899)
- Pseudogeoplana taenioides (von Graff, 1899)
- Pseudogeoplana theresopolitana (Schirch, 1929)
- Pseudogeoplana tricolor (Riester, 1938)
- Pseudogeoplana ucayalensis (Hyman, 1955)
- Pseudogeoplana wetzeli (Schirch, 1929)
