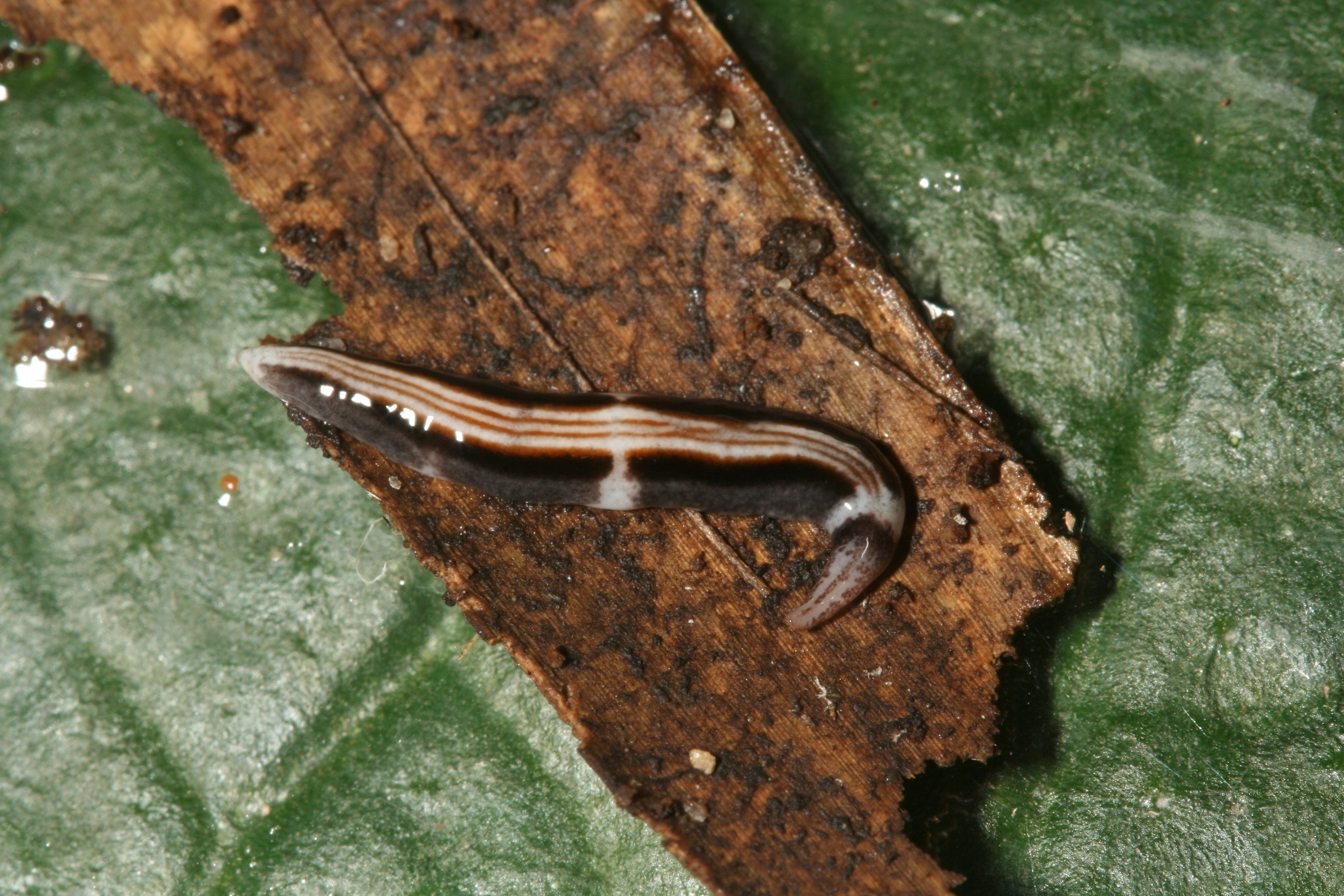
- Barreirana barreirana

Scientific classification
- Kingdom: Animalia
- Phylum: Platyhelminthes
- Order: Tricladida
- Family: Geoplanidae
- Subfamily: Geoplaninae
- Genus: Barreirana; Ogren & Kawakatsu, 1990

Type species
- Geoplana barreirana Riester, 1938

Synonyms
- Geoplana (Barreirana) Ogren & Kawakatsu, 1990

= Barreirana =

Genus of flatworms

Barreirana is a genus of land planarians from Brazil, formerly considered a subgenus of Geoplana.

== Description ==
The genus Barreirana includes land planarians with a small and slender body, usually around 2 cm long or less. The eyes occur along the whole body, covering almost the entire dorsum. The copulatory apparatus has a permanent conical penis occupying the entire male cavity. The only two species currently considered in the genus have a dorsal color pattern including transverse bands.

== Etymology ==
The name Barreirana comes from the specific epithet of the type species, Barreirana barreirana (formerly Geoplana barreirana) and refers to the type locality for the species, the district of Barreira in the city of Teresópolis, state of Rio de Janeiro, Brazil.

== Species ==
There are two described species in the genus Barreirana:

- Barreirana barreirana (Riester, 1938)
- Barreirana zebroides (Riester, 1938)
