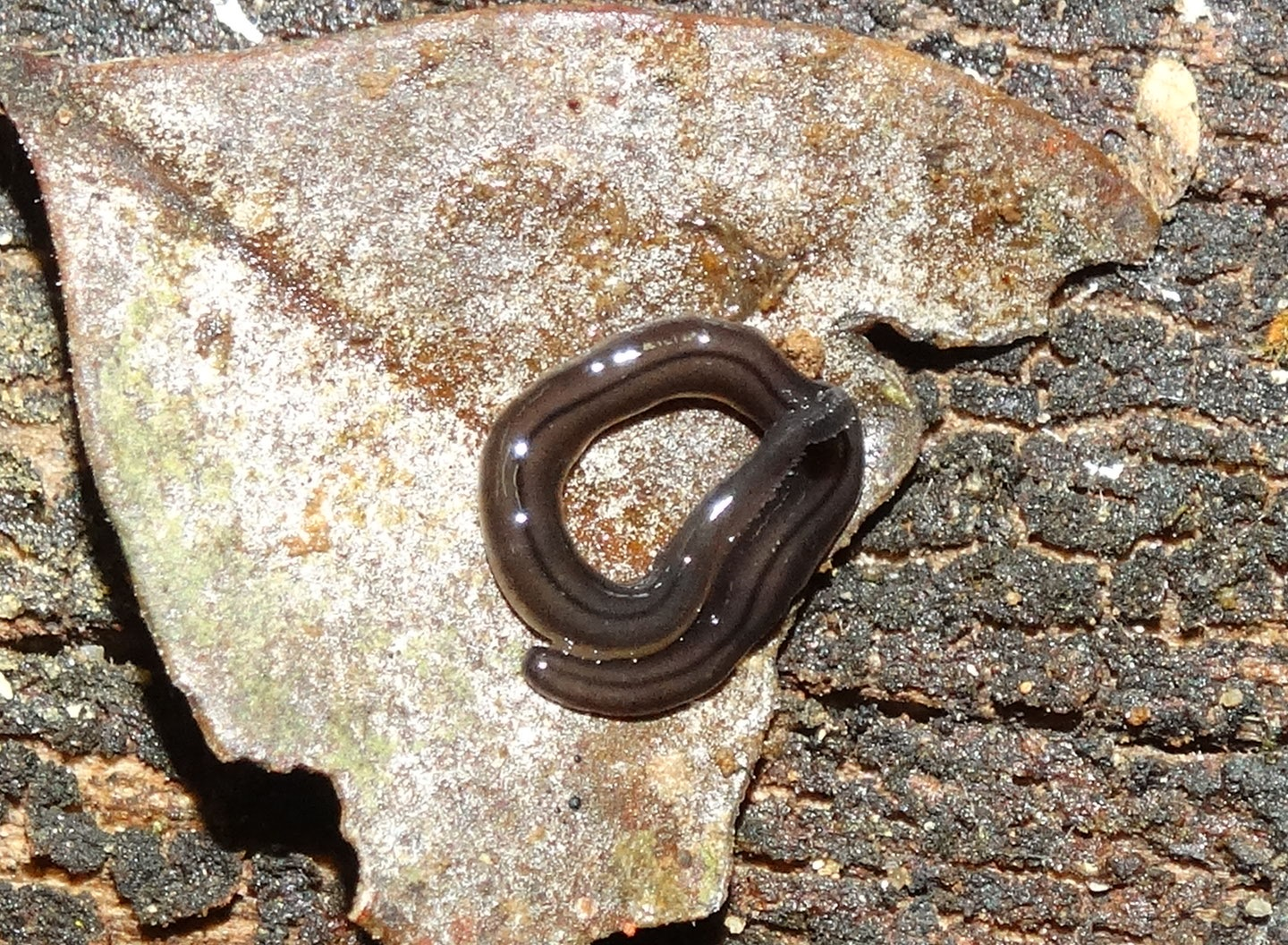
- Xerapoa hystrix

Scientific classification
- Kingdom: Animalia
- Phylum: Platyhelminthes
- Order: Tricladida
- Family: Geoplanidae
- Subfamily: Geoplaninae
- Genus: Xerapoa; Froehlich, 1955

Type species
- Xerapoa hystrix Froehlich, 1955

Synonyms
- Enterosyringa Ogren & Kawakatsu, 1990; Xarapoa Froehlich, 1955 (original misspelling)

= Xerapoa =

Genus of flatworms

Xerapoa is a genus of land planarians from Brazil.

== Description ==
The genus Xerapoa includes small-sized land planarians with subcylindrical body and anterior end raised. Usually the sensory pits of the anterior region open at the tip of small papillae. The ovaries are located more posteriorly in the body, close to the pharynx, when compared to other genera of the subfamily Geoplaninae, in which the ovaries are closer to the anterior end. The creeping sole is considerably thin, occupying about one third of the ventral side.

== Etymology ==
The name Xerapoa comes from Tupi xerapoa (sharp-pointed), referring to the spiny aspect of the anterior end in species with sensorial papillae.

== Species ==
The genus Xerapoa includes four described species:

- Xerapoa hystrix Froehlich, 1955
- Xerapoa pseudorhynchodemus (Riester, 1938)
- Xerapoa trina (Marcus, 1951)
- Xerapoa una Froehlich, 1955
