= Liana guasa =

Scientific classification
- Kingdom: Animalia
- Phylum: Platyhelminthes
- Order: Tricladida
- Family: Geoplanidae
- Subfamily: Geoplaninae
- Genus: Liana; Froehlich, 1978
- Species: L. guasa

Binomial name
- Liana guasa Froehlich, 1978

Species of flatworm

Liana is a genus of land planarians. It is monotypic, being represented by the single species Liana guasa, which occurs in Chile.

== Description ==
Liana was defined as land planarians with a broad and elongated body. The cutaneous musculature is strong dorsally and weak ventrally, where it is partially sunk into the mesenchyma. The sensory border has rare and minute sensory pits restricted to the anterior tip. The copulatory apparatus has a short and blunt penis papilla and the female canal enters the genital antrum ventrally.
