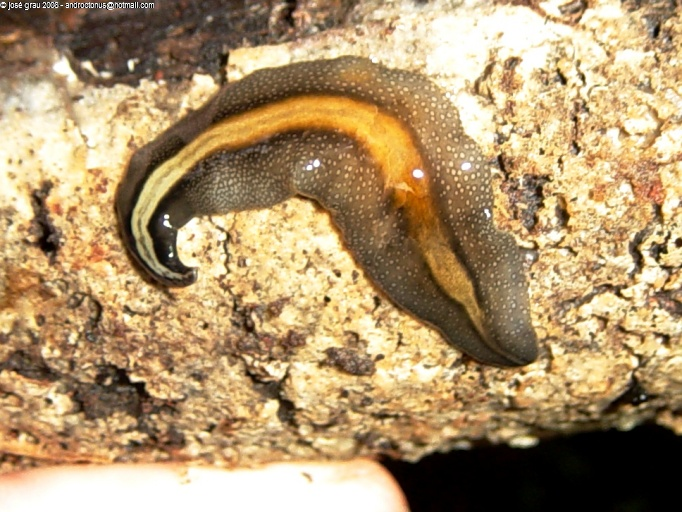
- Obama burmeisteri

Scientific classification
- Kingdom: Animalia
- Phylum: Platyhelminthes
- Order: Tricladida
- Family: Geoplanidae
- Subfamily: Geoplaninae

Tribes
- Adinoplanini; Geoplanini; Gusanini; Haranini; Inakayaliini; Myoplanini; Polycladini; Sarcoplanini; Timymini

= Geoplaninae =

Subfamily of flatworms

Geoplaninae is a subfamily of land planarians endemic to the Neotropical region. Members of this family are sometimes referred to as the Neotropical land planarians. However, one species, Obama nungara has been introduced in Europe.

== Description ==
The subfamily Geoplaninae was initially defined by Ogren and Kawakatsu (1990) for land planarians which have a broad creeping sole, mouth in the second half of the body, dorsal testes, subepithelial longitudinal musculature well developed and parenchymal longitudinal musculature absent or not well developed. The eyes contour the anterior region in a single row and posteriorly form several rows, which may spread onto the dorsum, and extend to the posterior end of the body. However, most, if not all, of these characteristics are not exclusive and cannot be considered a synapomorphy of the group. Some characteristics have also been reverted in some genera. Nevertheless, phylogenetic studies have revealed that Geoplaninae is indeed a monophyletic group.

== Genera ==
Currently the land planarians in the subfamily Geoplaninae are grouped into 9 tribes and 36 genera:

=== Adinoplanini ===
- Adinoplana Almeida & Carbayo,2022

=== Geoplanini ===
- Amaga Ogren & Kawakatsu, 1990
- Anophthalmoplana Negrete, Francavilla, Damborenea & Brusa, 2022
- Barreirana Ogren & Kawakatsu, 1990
- Cephaloflexa Carbayo & Leal-Zanchet, 2003
- Choeradoplana von Graff, 1896
- Cratera Carbayo et al., 2013
- Difroehlichia Leal-Zanchet & Marques, 2018
- Geobia Diesing, 1861
- Geoplana Stimpson, 1857
- Gigantea Ogren & Kawakatsu, 1990
- Imbira Carbayo et al., 2013
- Issoca C. G. Froehlich, 1955
- Luteostriata Carbayo, 2010
- Matuxia Carbayo et al., 2013
- Notogynaphallia Ogren & Kawakatsu, 1990
- Obama Carbayo et al., 2013
- Paraparaba Rossi, Boll & Leal-Zanchet, 2024
- Pasipha Ogren & Kawakatsu, 1990
- Piima Carbayo, 2020
- Pseudogeoplana Ogren & Kawakatsu, 1990
- Supramontana Carbayo & Leal-Zanchet, 2003
- Transandiplana Almeida & Carbayo,2022
- Winsoria Negrete et al., 2019
- Xerapoa C. G. Froehlich, 1955

=== Gusanini ===
- Gusana E. M. Froehlich, 1978

=== Haranini ===
- Harana Almeida & Carbayo,2022

=== Inakayaliini ===
- Inakayalia Negrete, Álvarez-Presas, Riutort & Brusa, 2020

=== Myoplanini ===
- Myoplana Almeida & Carbayo,2022

=== Polycladini ===
- Polycladus Blanchard, 1845

=== Sarcoplanini ===
- Liana E. M. Froehlich, 1978
- Mapuplana Grau, Almeida, Sluys & Carbayo, 2012
- Pichidamas Bulnes, Grau & Carbayo, 2018
- Sarcoplana Almeida & Carbayo,2022
- Wallmapuplana Negrete, Álvarez-Presas, Riutort & Brusa, 2020

=== Timymini ===
- Timyma E.M. Froehlich, 1978
