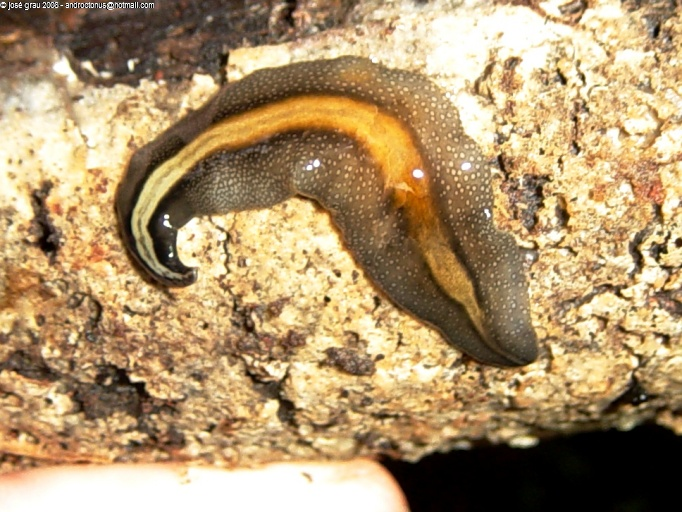
- Obama burmeisteri from the Atlantic rainforests of southern Brazil

Scientific classification
- Kingdom: Animalia
- Phylum: Platyhelminthes
- Order: Tricladida
- Superfamily: Geoplanoidea
- Family: Geoplanidae; Stimpson, 1857

Subfamilies
- See text

Synonyms
- Terricola Hallez, 1857

= Geoplanidae =

Family of flatworms

Geoplanidae is a family of flatworms known commonly as land planarians or land flatworms.

These flatworms are mainly predators of other invertebrates, which they hunt, attack and capture using physical force and the adhesive and digestive properties of their mucus. They lack water-retaining mechanisms and are therefore very sensitive to humidity variations of their environment.

Because of their strict ecological requirements, some species have been proposed as indicators of the conservation state of their habitats. They are generally animals with low vagility (dispersal ability) and with very specific habitat requirements, so they can be also used to accurately determine the distribution of biogeographic realms. Today the fauna of these animals is being studied to select conservation priorities in the Atlantic rainforest in Brazil.

At the other extreme, one species in this family, Platydemus manokwari has become an invasive species in both disturbed and wild habitats in the Pacific Islands, and has damaged the endemic land snail fauna. This species has been found in Europe (France) in 2013 for the first time, and in 2015 in New Caledonia, Wallis and Futuna Islands, Singapore, Solomon Islands, Puerto Rico (first record in the Caribbean), and Florida, USA.

== Description ==
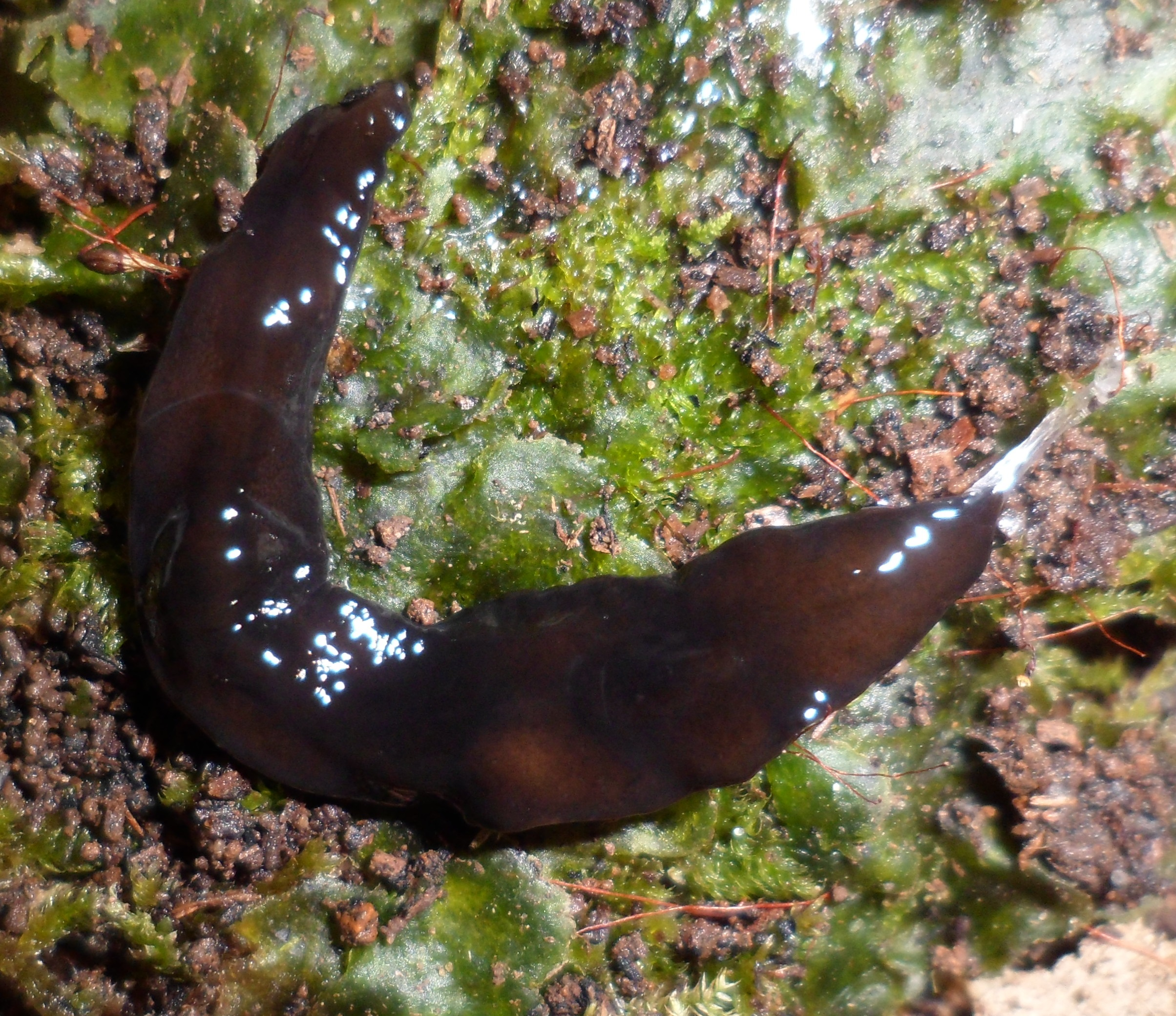
Obama anthropophila is a land planarian with dull colors.

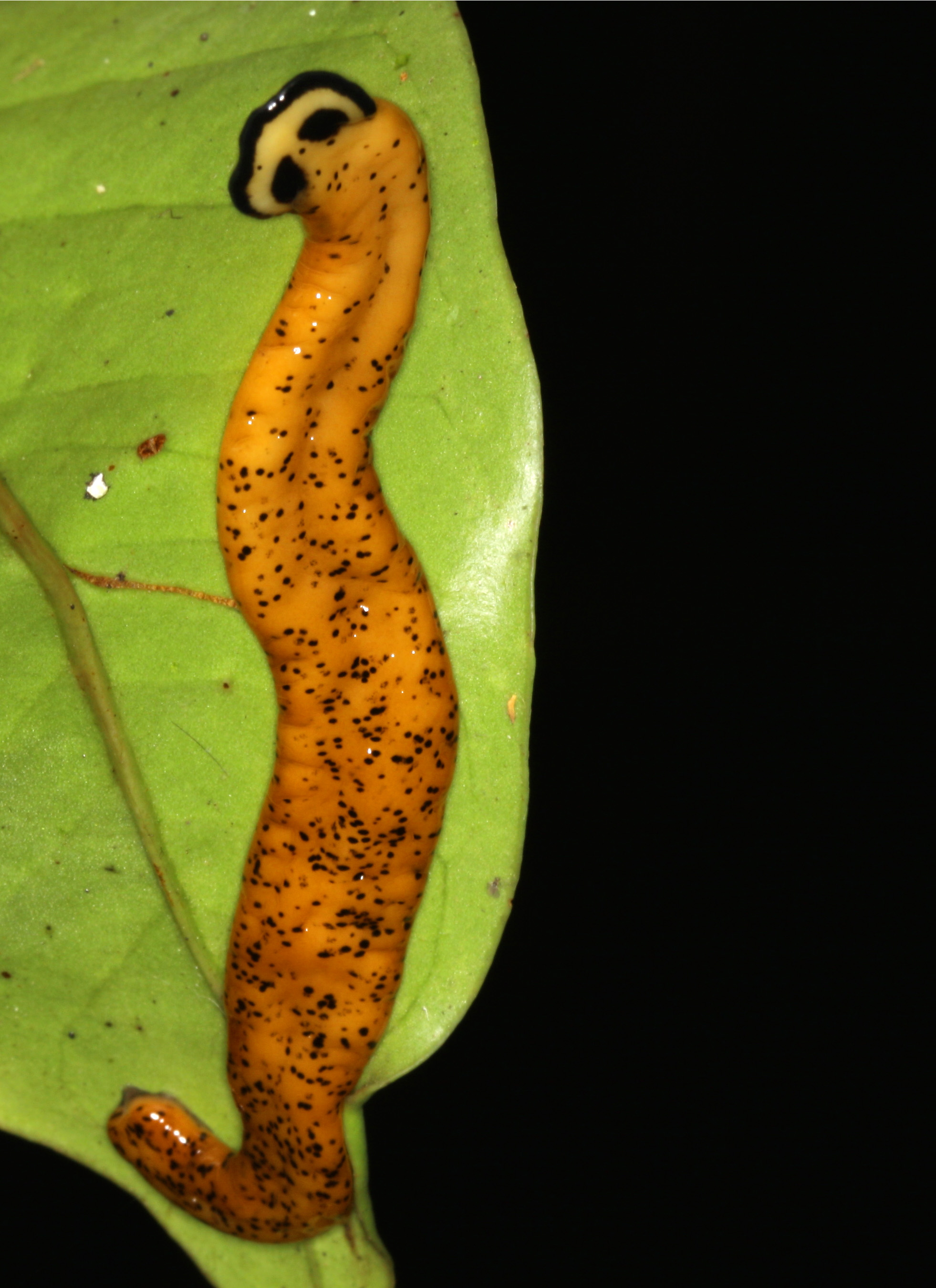
A colorful species of the subfamily Bipaliinae.

Land planarians are distinguished from their marine and freshwater relatives by their terrestrial habits, as well as by morphological distinctions. Some species have dull colors, including shades of brown and grey, that make them inconspicuous in their environment, but most species are marked by very colorful patterns. At first they may be confused with slugs or leeches, but they lack the anterior tentacles of slugs and the segmentation of leeches. Their size vary greatly, from a few millimeters in length to about one metre.

The most distinguishing feature that characterizes land planarians is the presence of a creeping sole, a highly ciliated region on the ventral epidermis that helps them to creep over the substrate. The creeping sole may be wide and flat, occupying most of the ventral surface, or narrow and pronounced, being easily distinguished from the rest of the ventral surface.

== Anatomy ==
=== Epidermis ===
The epidermis of land planarians is composed by a simple epithelium of cubic or columnar cells. The cells are ciliated only on a ventral region, called creeping sole, which the animal uses to glide over surfaces. Numerous secretory cells open throughout the epidermis, the most characteristic ones being the rhabditogen cells, which produce a secretion in the form of small rod-like structures, the rhabdites. Rhabditogen cells are very numerous on the dorsal epidermis, but rare on the ventral side.

=== Nervous system ===
The nervous system of land planarians has the longitudinal nerve cords reduced to one ventral pair that is located much deeper in the body than in other triclads. These ventral cords are usually connected by many comissures, so that they fuse into a single ventral nerve plate. Additionally, land planarians have a highly developed ventral nerve plexus just below the epidermis that is probably associated to the presence of a creeping sole.

Contrary to aquatic planarians, land planarians do not have a distinct brain, i.e., there is no clear frontal cluster of nerve cells other than the ventral nerve plate.

== Diversity ==
The family Geoplanidae is composed of five subfamilies:

- Bipaliinae
- Geoplaninae
- Microplaninae
- Rhynchodeminae
- Timyminae

Although there are over 830 known species of Geoplanidae in the world, the diversity of land planarians is still poorly known. The highest diversity occurs in tropical forests in South America, Asia and Australia. Europe and North America are relatively species-poor, while the diversity of Africa may be as high as that of other tropical regions, but is highly understudied.

== Habitat ==
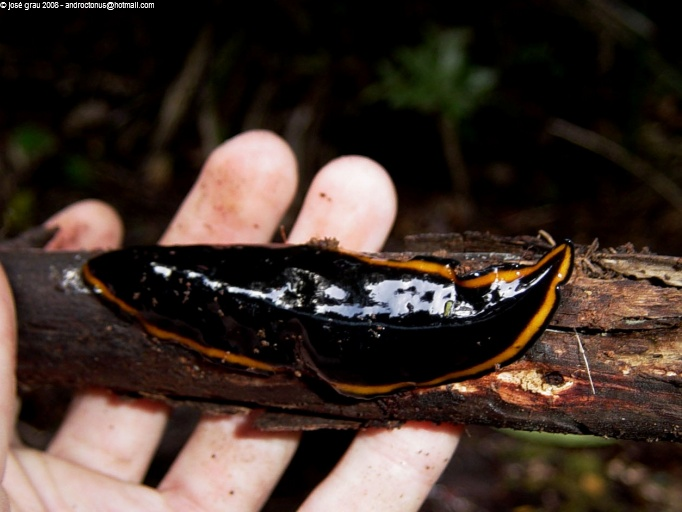
Polycladus gayi from the Valdivian rainforests of southern Chile

Most species of land planarians live at the soil of forests, especially in the leaf litter layer, but some may inhabit galleries constructed by other invertebrates or be found on vegetation, such as bromeliads. Despite being sensitive to dehydration, some species are well adapted to considerably dry environments, such as savannas.

During unfavorable conditions, such as dry seasons, land planarians tend to seek shelter by burrowing in the soil or building a cyst composed of soil particles united by mucus.

Some species are well adapted to human-disturbed environments and many of those have been introduced in areas outside of their native range. In some localities, such as the United Kingdom, the number of introduced land planarian species greatly surpass the number of described native species.

== Feeding and predatory behavior ==
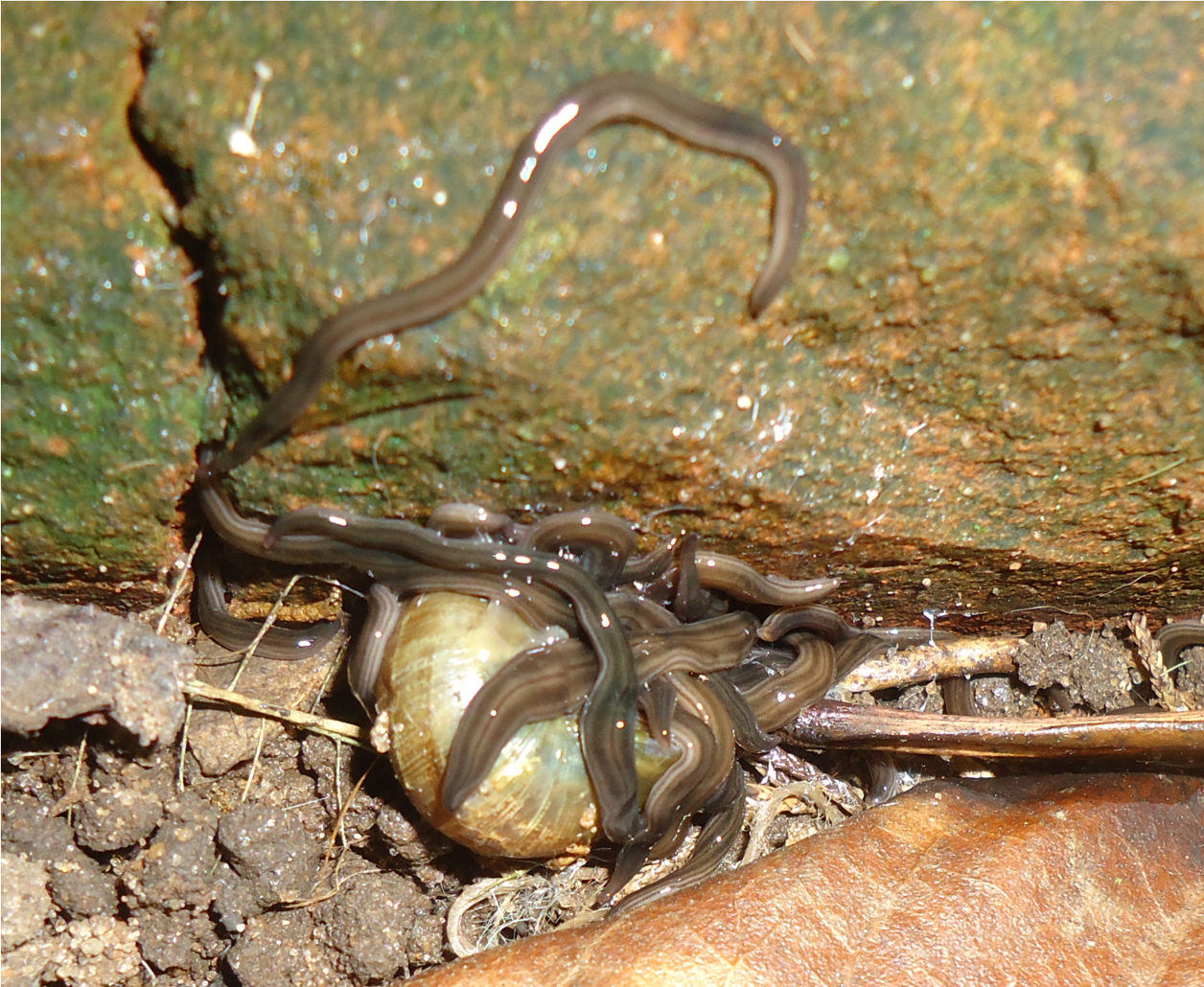
A group of land planarians of the species Endeavouria septemlineata feeding on a land snail, Bradybaena similaris

Land planarians are carnivorous and most species are active predators, but some are mainly scavengers.

All planarians feed through a muscular and eversible pharynx located slightly posteriorly to the middle of the body length and opening through a ventral mouth. The pharynx is an extensible tube-like organ bearing a complex muscular coat. It specializes as a penetration organ for those planarians that feed on arthropods; or as a grasping organ for those planarians that feed on other soft bodied invertebrates such as earthworms. All geoplanidae pharynxes are equipped with glandular secretions that externally digest and dissolve their prey.

As part of the soil ecosystem, land planarians feed mainly on other invertebrates, such as earthworms, snails, slugs, nemerteans, velvet worms, woodlice, millipedes, insects and arachnids. Some may even feed on other land planarians.

Some species of land planarians have become invasive pest species. The New Zealand flatworm Arthurdendyus triangulatus and the Australian flatworm Australoplana sanguinea alba have been introduced in the British Isles and are considered to be pest species because they prey upon earthworms and thus may negatively affect soil structure and fertility. Another species, Platydemus manokwari, has been used as an agent of biological pest control of the introduced giant African snail Achatina fulica in Hawaii, the Maldives, Irian Jaya, and Guam, but has become an even worse pest and today threatens several native snail populations in the Pacific.

Some land planarians show hunting behaviour, using chemical signals to detect their prey. Most land planarians have chemical sensory organs in the anterior part of the body, such as sensory pits and epidermal folds which serve as chemical radars for detecting their food. The mucus trails from the slime of slugs, snails and other planarians orient planarians towards their prey. Different species use different techniques for capturing and immobilizing their prey, such as entrapment with sticky mucus and immobilization by physical force.

Cannibalism has been observed in land planarians.

== Phylogeny and systematics ==
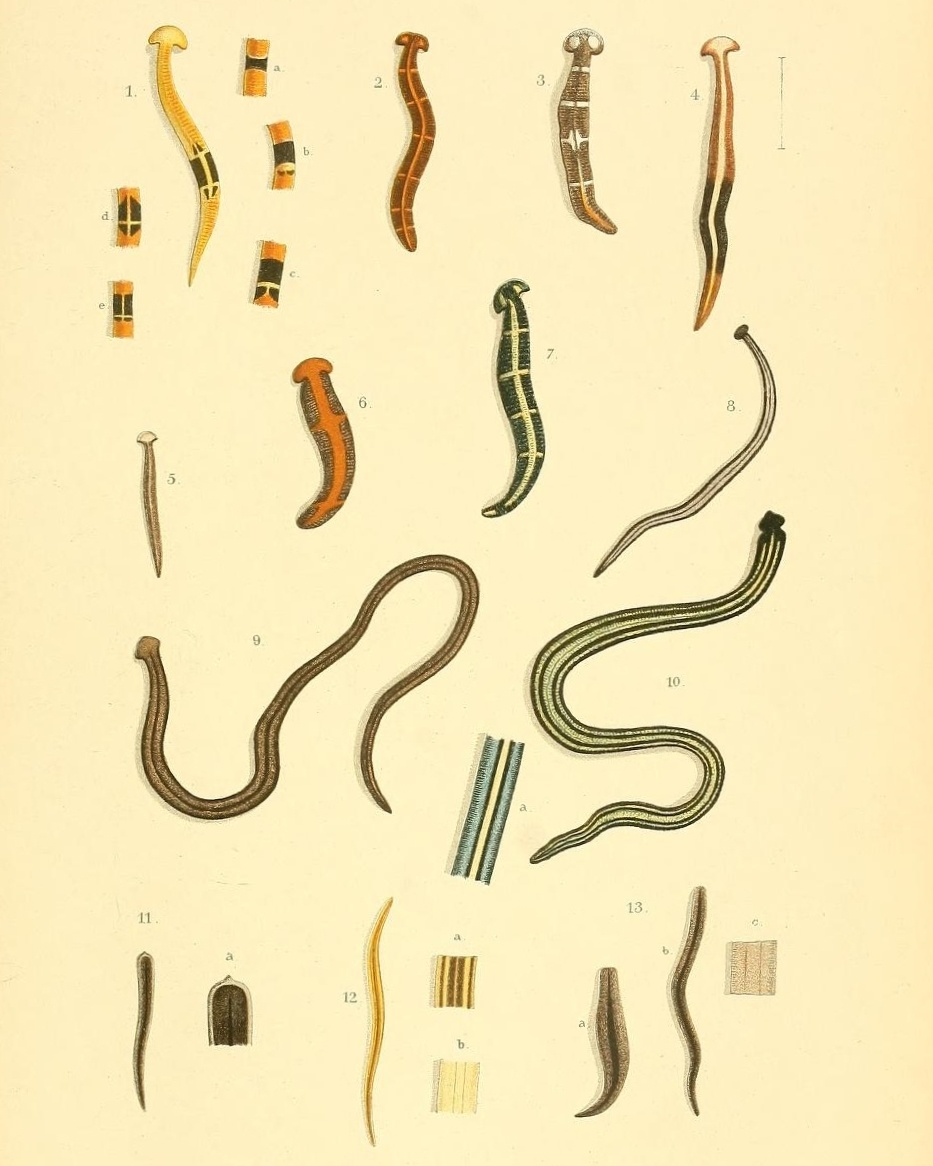
Assorted land planarians from Southeast Asia

Until very recently, land planarians were classified as a suborder within Tricladida, named Terricola. However, recent phylogenetic studies revealed that they are actually the sister-group of Dugesiidae, a family of freshwater planarians (at that time part of the suborder Paludicola). The most recent classification puts both land and freshwater planarians within a single suborder called Continenticola, with land planarians forming a single family, Geoplanidae.

The following phylogenetic supertree after Sluys et al., 2009 presents the current classification of planarians:

- Tricladida
  - Maricola
  - - Cavernicola
    - Continenticola
      - Planarioidea
        - Planariidae
        - - Kenkiidae
          - Dendrocoelidae
      - Geoplanoidea
        - Dugesiidae
        - Geoplanidae

In the former suborder Terricola, land planarians were separated into three families according to morphological features:

- Bipaliidae: head expanded in a spatula-like shape and multiple eyes;
- Rhynchodemidae: non-expanded head and a single pair of eyes. It included two subfamilies: Rhynchodeminae, with subepithelial longitudinal muscular fibers grouped into large bundles, and Microplaninae, with weaker subepithelial longitudinal muscular fibers not forming bundles;
- Geoplanidae: non-expanded head and multiple eyes. It included three subfamilies: Geoplaninae, with dorsal testicles and strong subepithelial longitudinal muscles, Caenoplaninae, with ventral testicles and strong subepithelial longitudinal muscles, and Pelmatoplaninae, with ventral testicles and weak subepithelial longitudinal muscles.

Recent phylogenetic analyses, however, revealed that Rhynchodeminae and Microplaninae are not closely related and that Caenoplaninae is closer to Rhynchodeminae than to Geoplaninae. The current classification of land planarian subfamilies is shown in the following phylogenetic tree after Álvarez-Presas et al., 2008. The old subfamilies Caenoplaninae and Pelmatoplaninae have been included as tribes Caenoplanini and Pelmatoplanini inside Rhynchodeminae. Note that Spathula and Romankenkius belong to the family Dugesiidae. Their relocation inside Geoplanidae needs further investigation.

- Geoplanoidea
  - Dugesiidae
  - Geoplanidae
    - Bipaliinae
    - - - Geoplaninae
        - - Caenoplaninae
          - Rhynchodeminae
      - - Microplaninae
        - (Spathula + Romankenkius)

== Image gallery ==
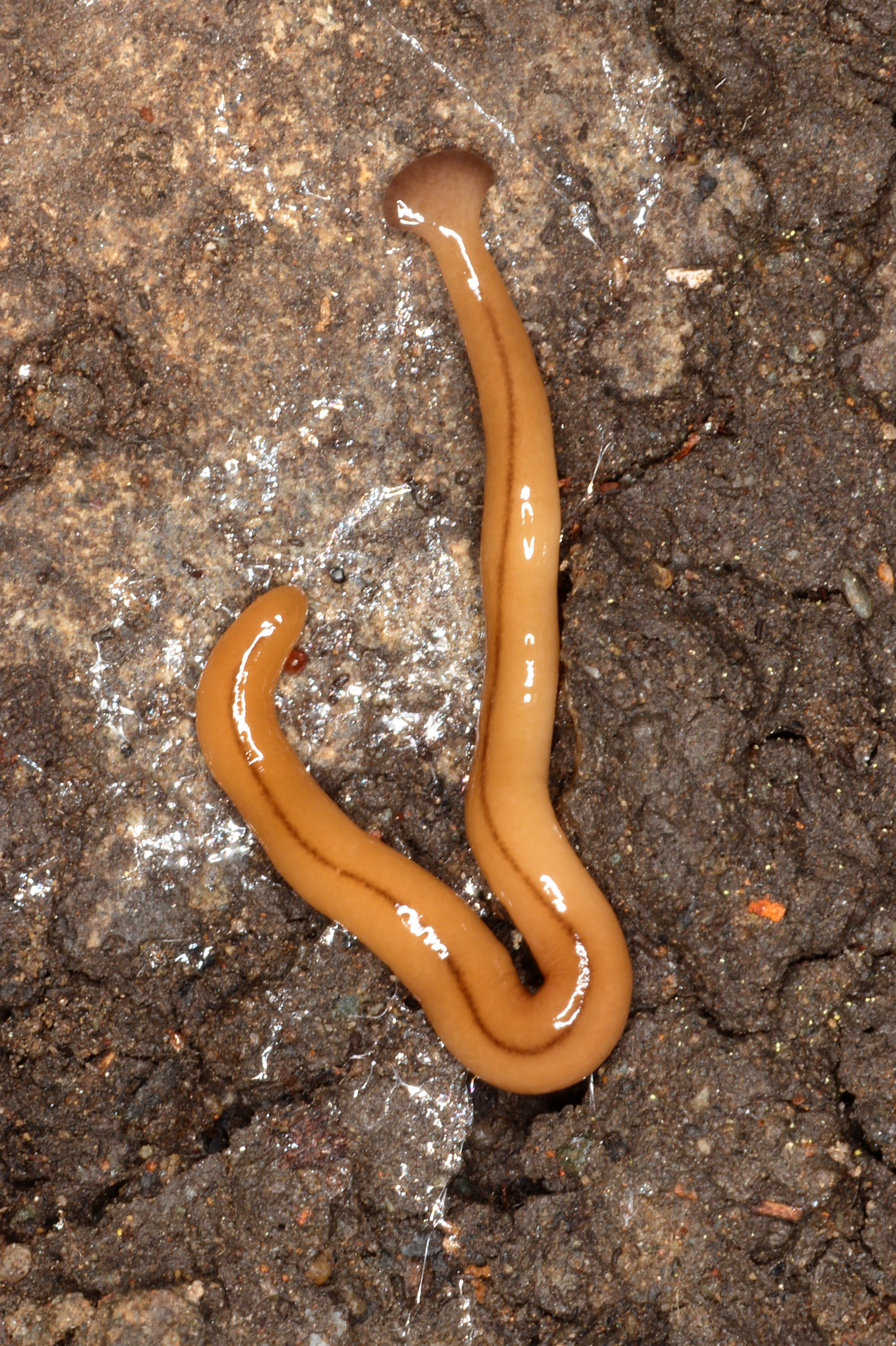
Bipalium adventitium close up under a rock, North California, USA.

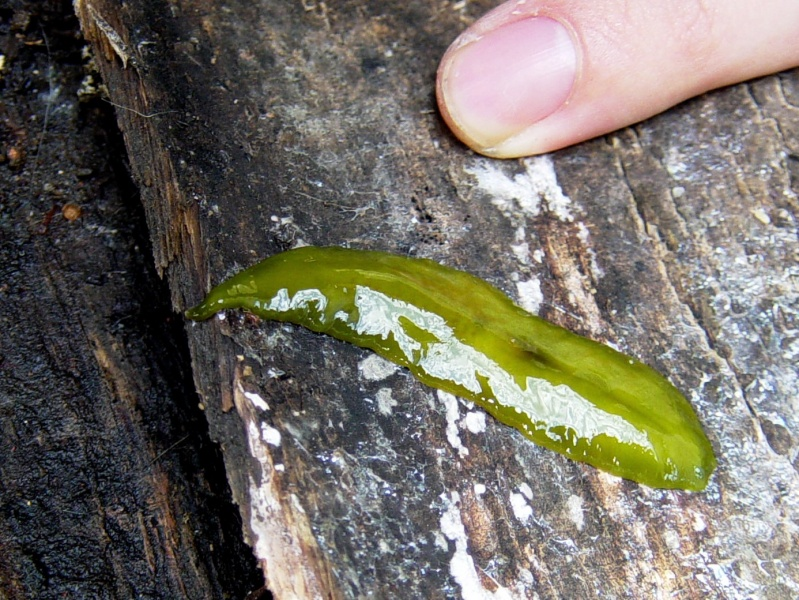
Obama ladislavii from a garden in Porto Alegre, southern Brazil.

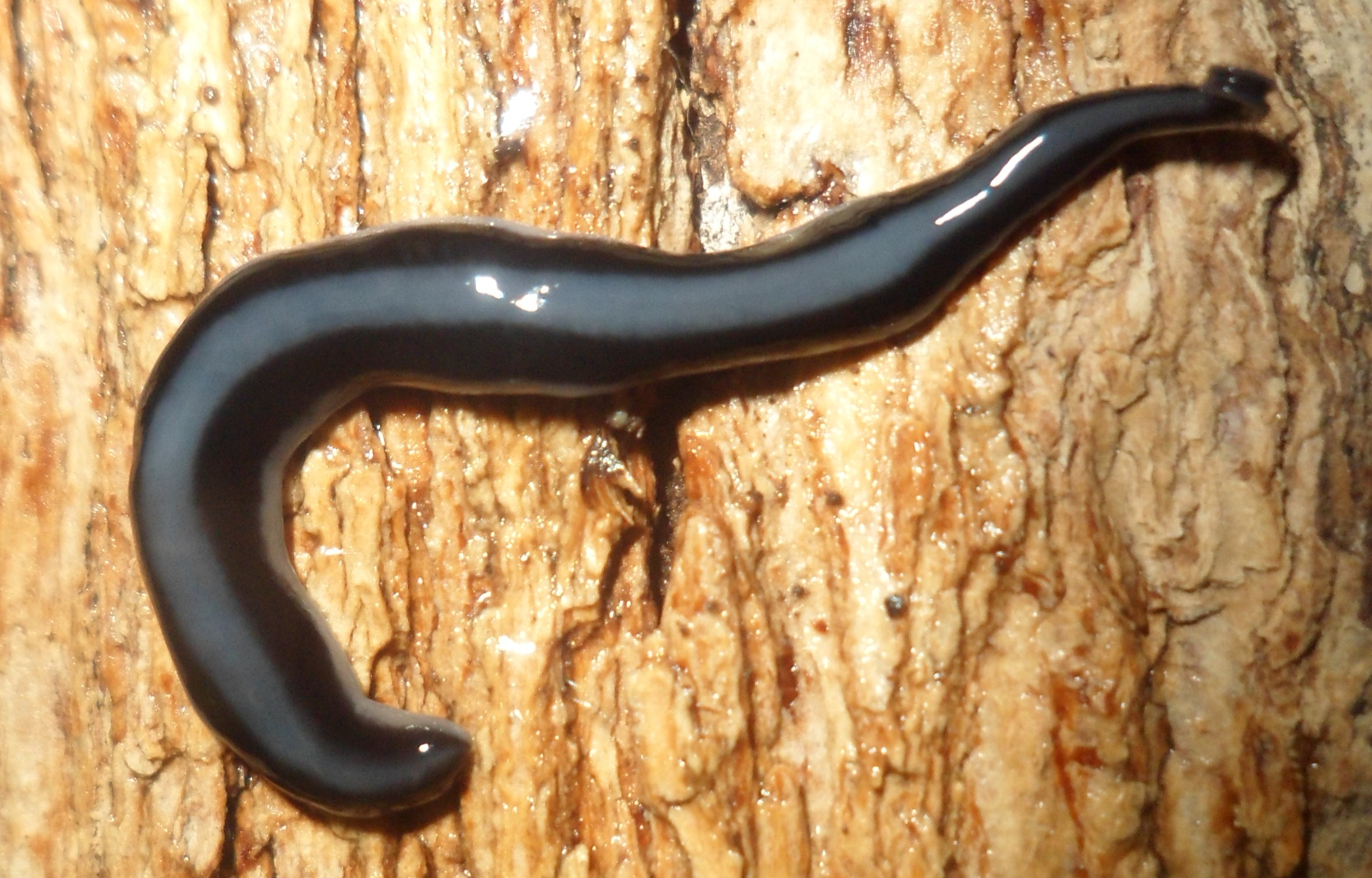
Cephaloflexa araucariana from the São Francisco de Paula National Forest, southern Brazil.

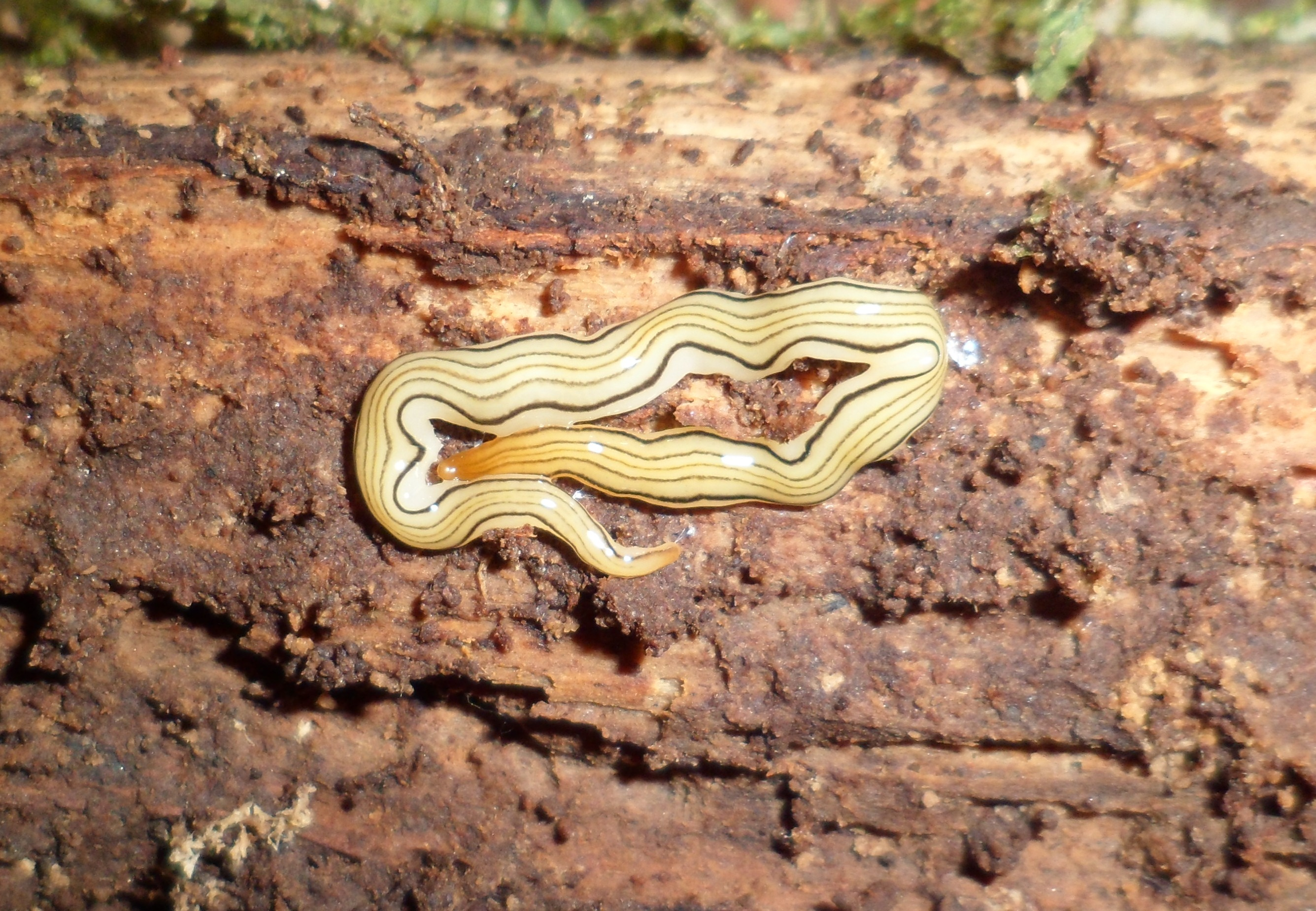
Luteostriata ernesti in the São Francisco de Paula National Forest.

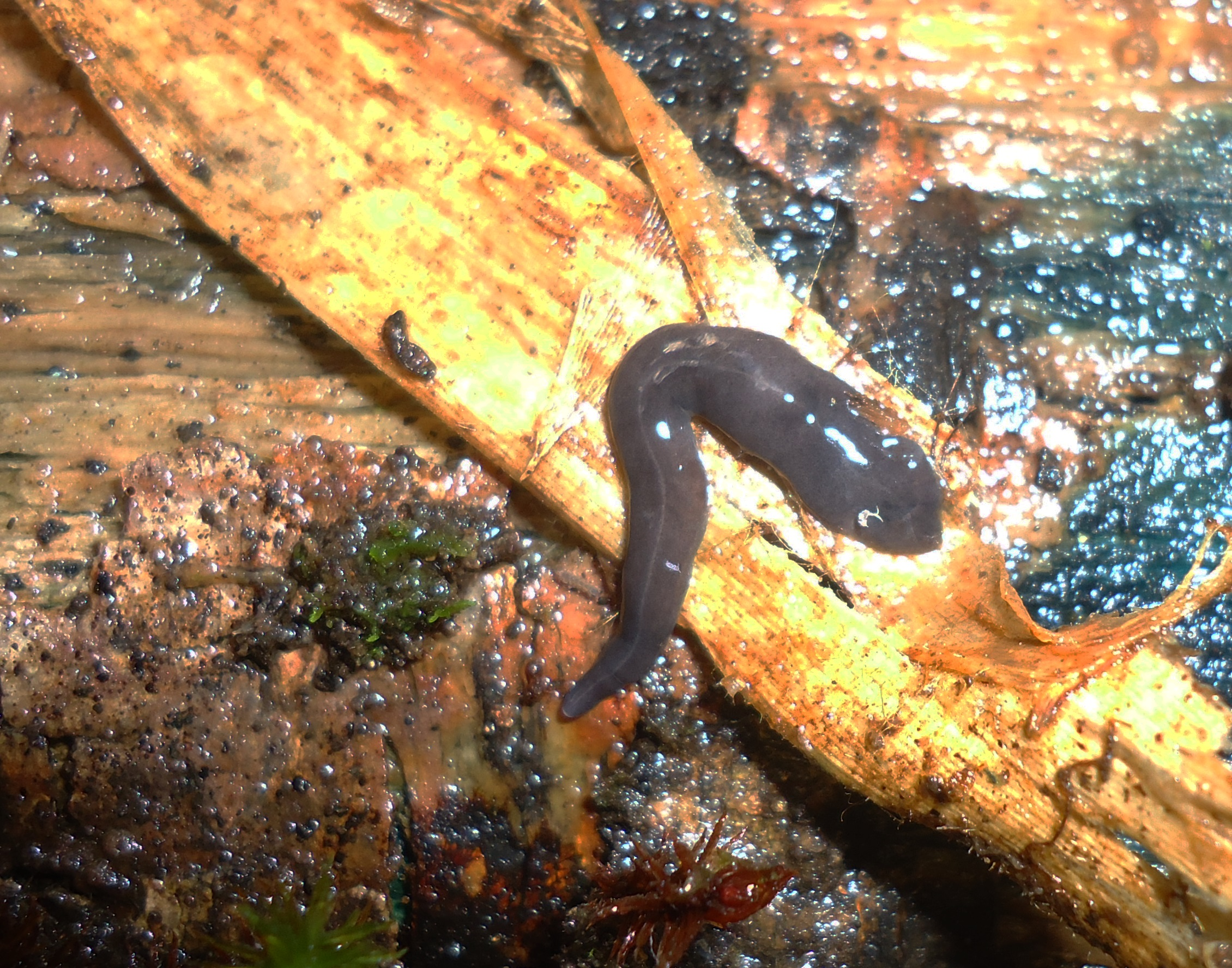
Notogynaphallia plumbea from an Araucaria moist forest in Paraná, Brazil.

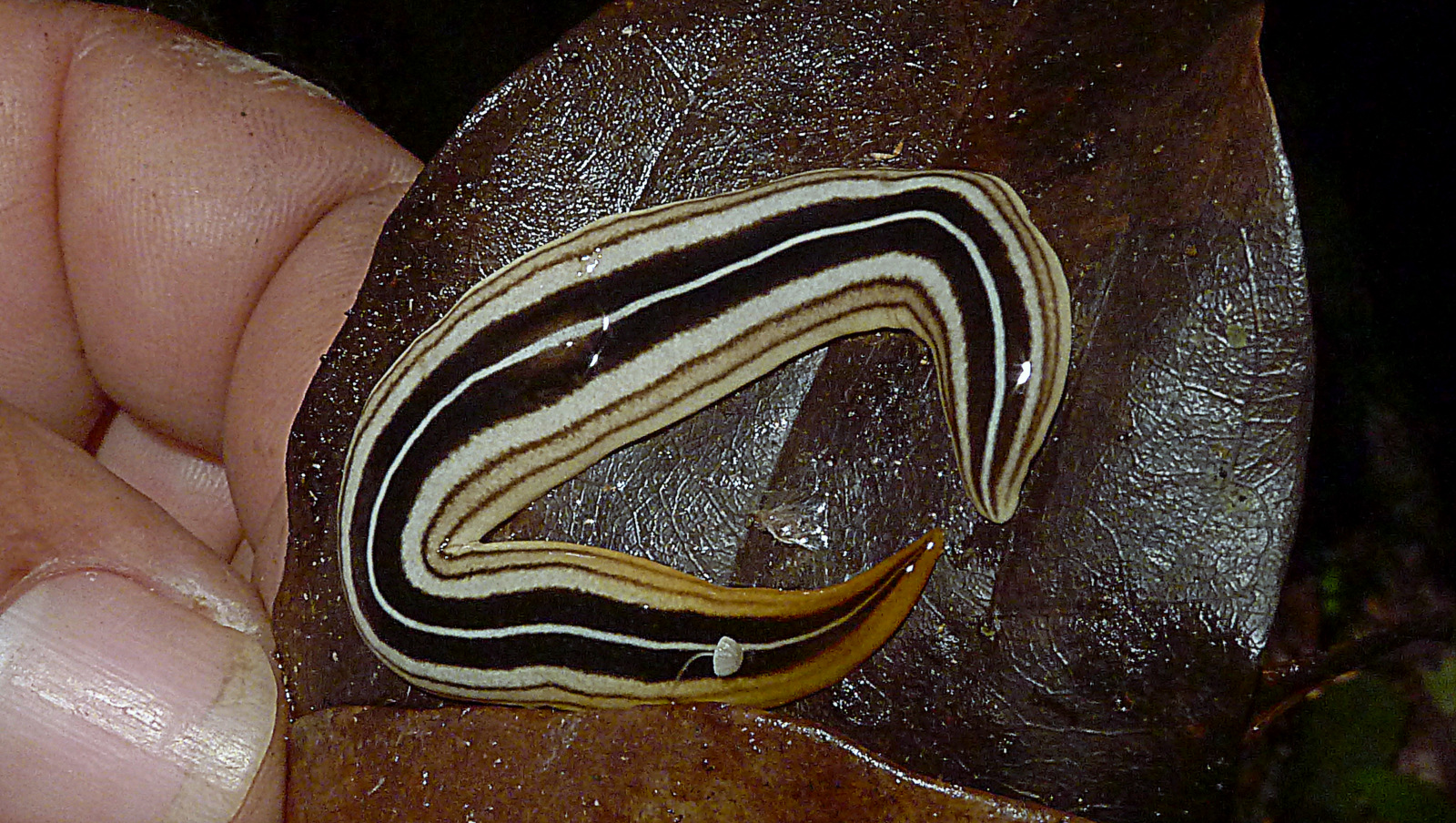
Unidentified land planarian from Bahia, Brazil.

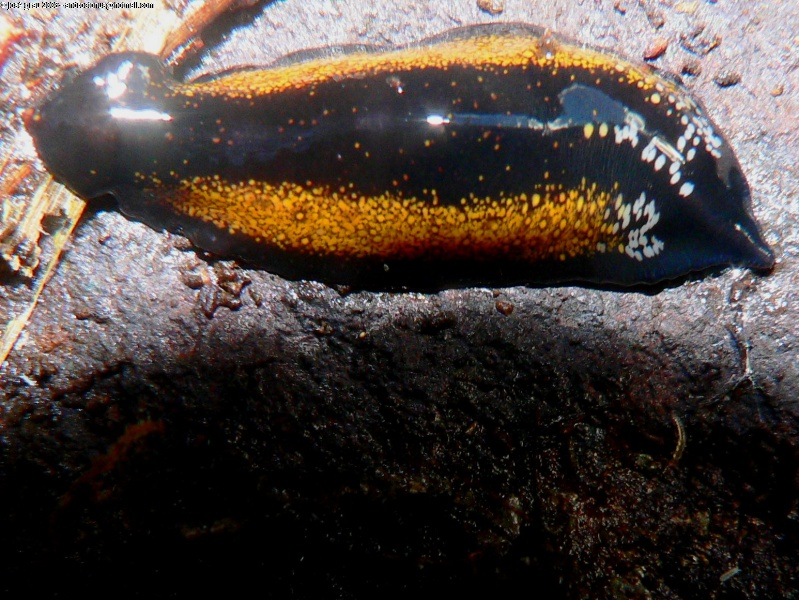
Unidentified land planarian from the Valdivian Rainforest in southern Chile.

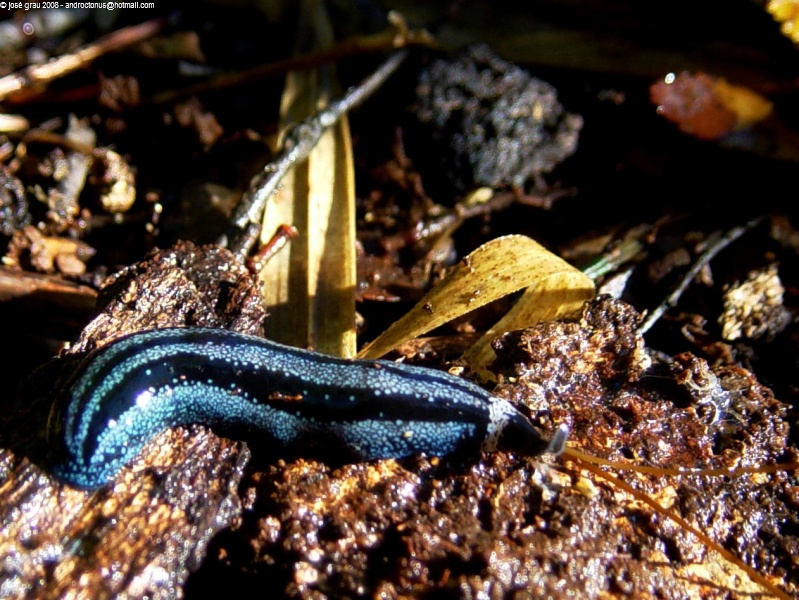
Pseudogeoplana reticulata from the Valdivian Rainforest.

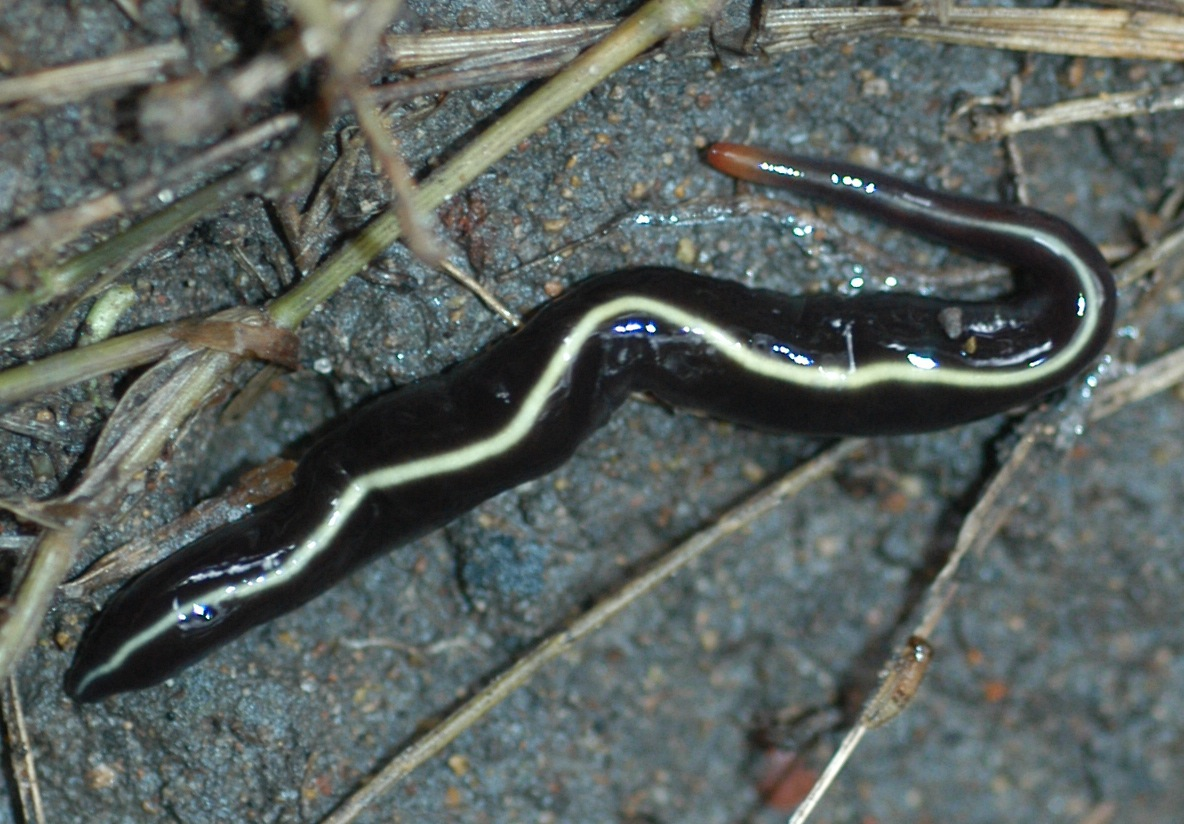
Caenoplana coerulea, the blue planarian.

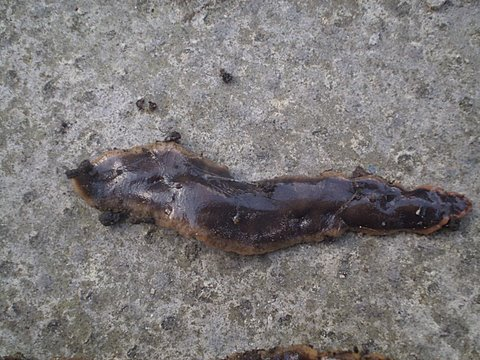
Arthurdendyus triangulatus, the New Zealand flatworm.

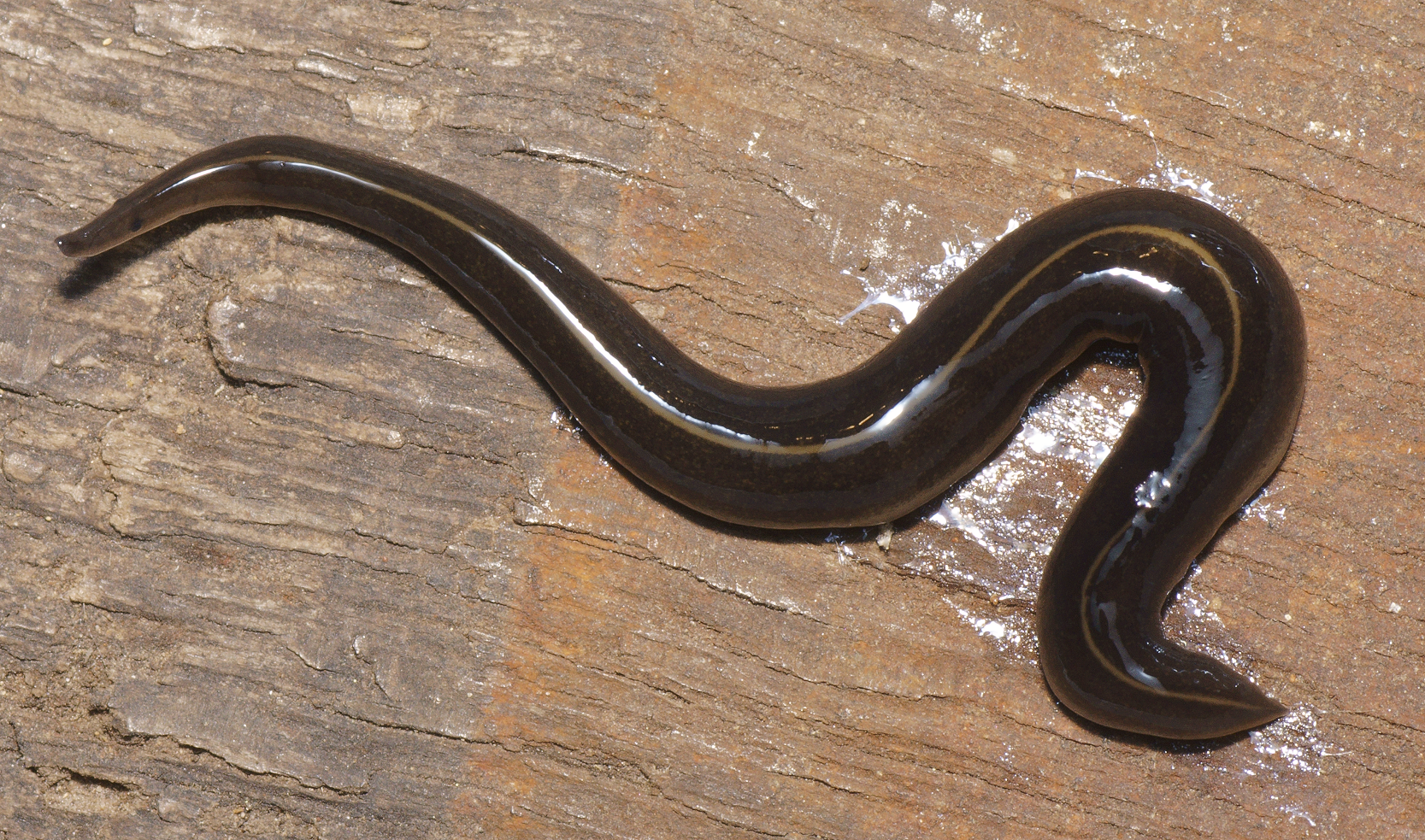
Platydemus manokwari in France.

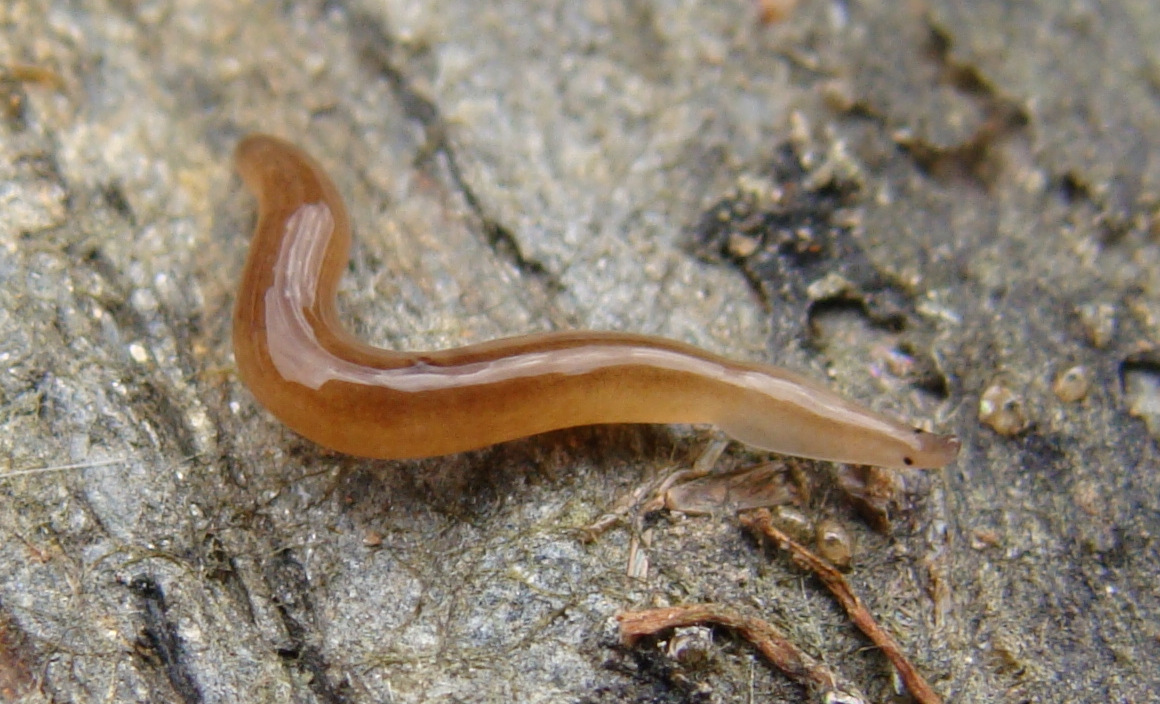
Rhynchodemus sylvaticus in the Iberian Peninsula.

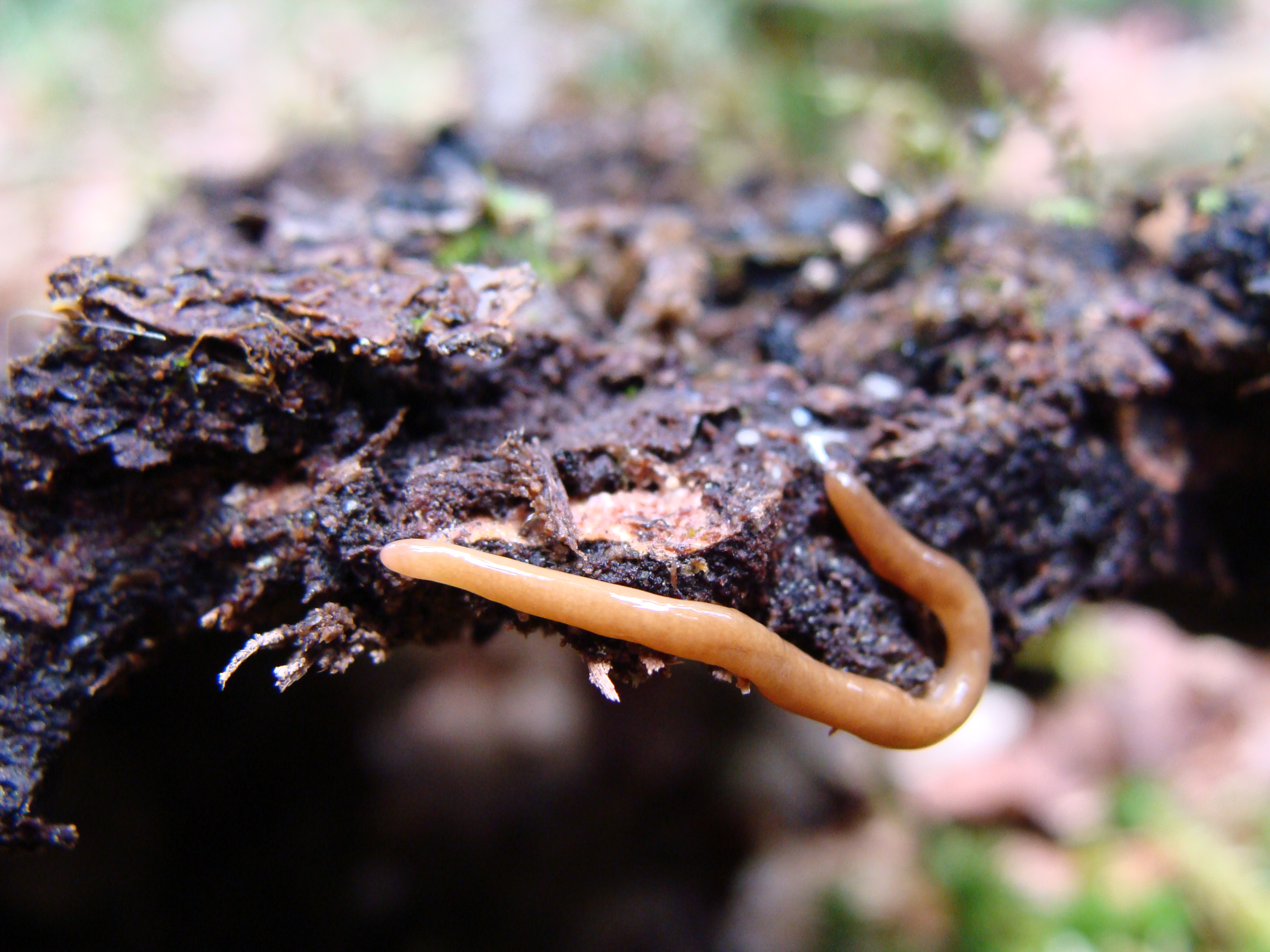
Microplana robusta in Portugal.

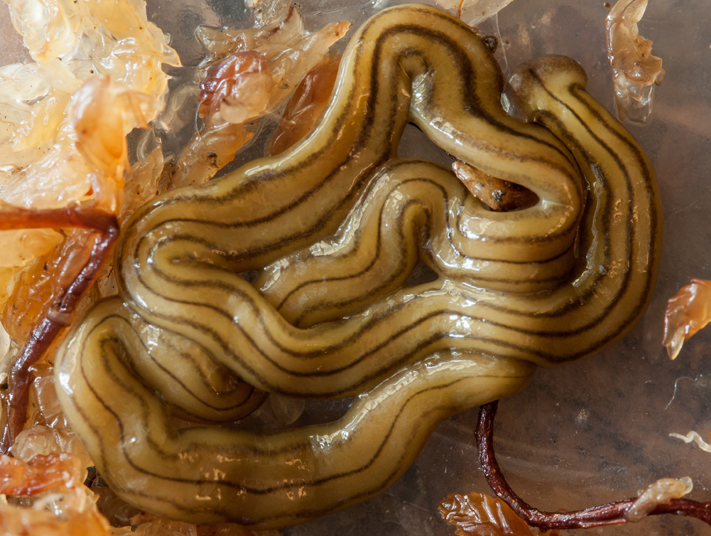
Diversibipalium multilineatum in Italy.

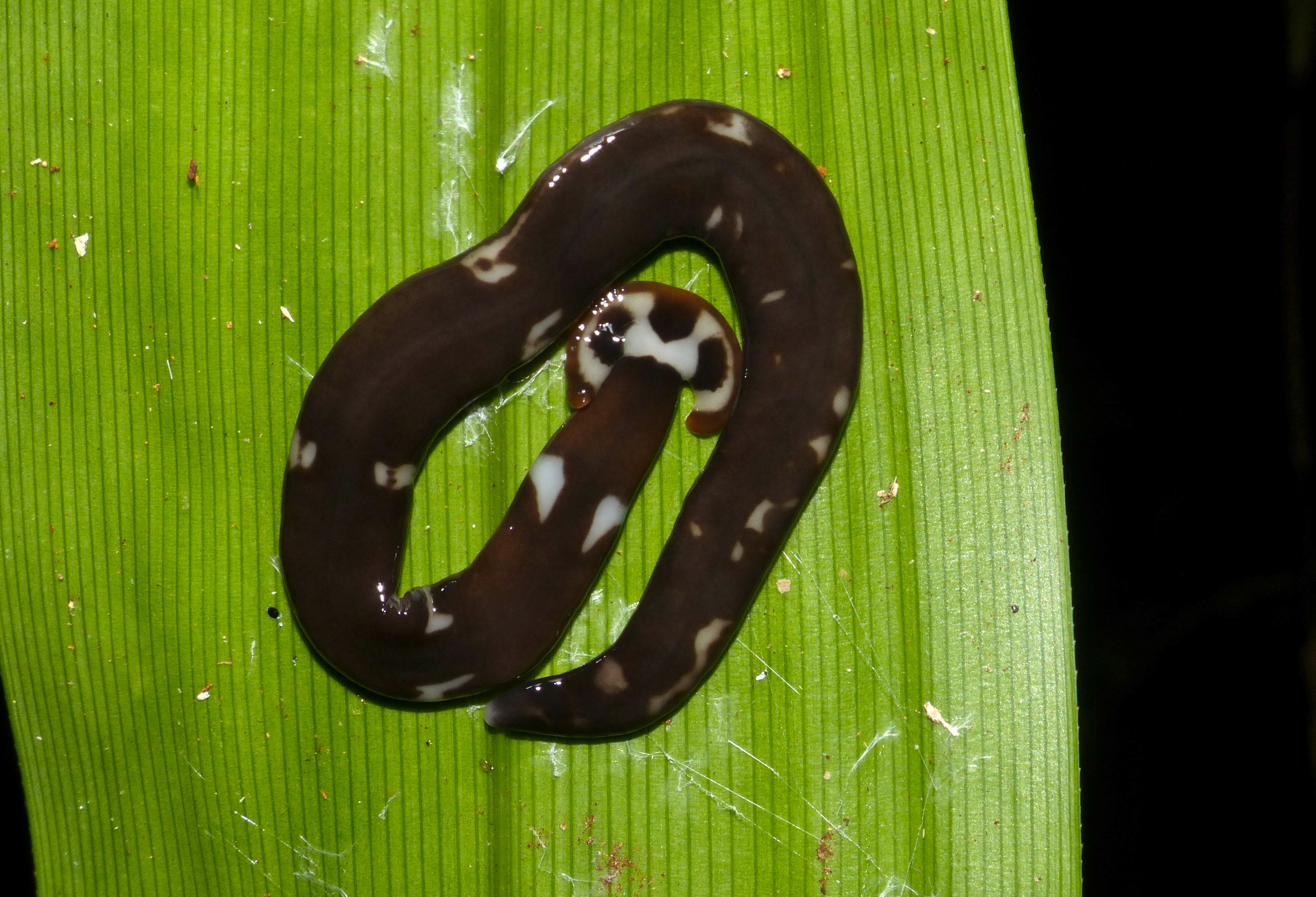
Species of subfamily Bipaliinae in Sarawak, Malaysia.

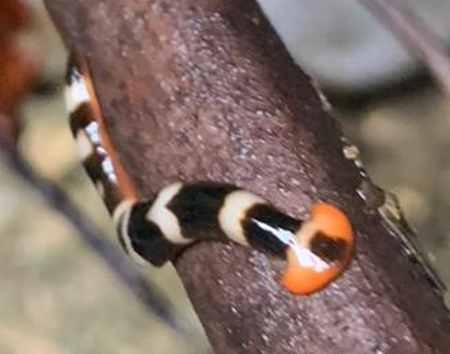
Diversibipalium rauchi in Thomson Nature Park, Singapore.

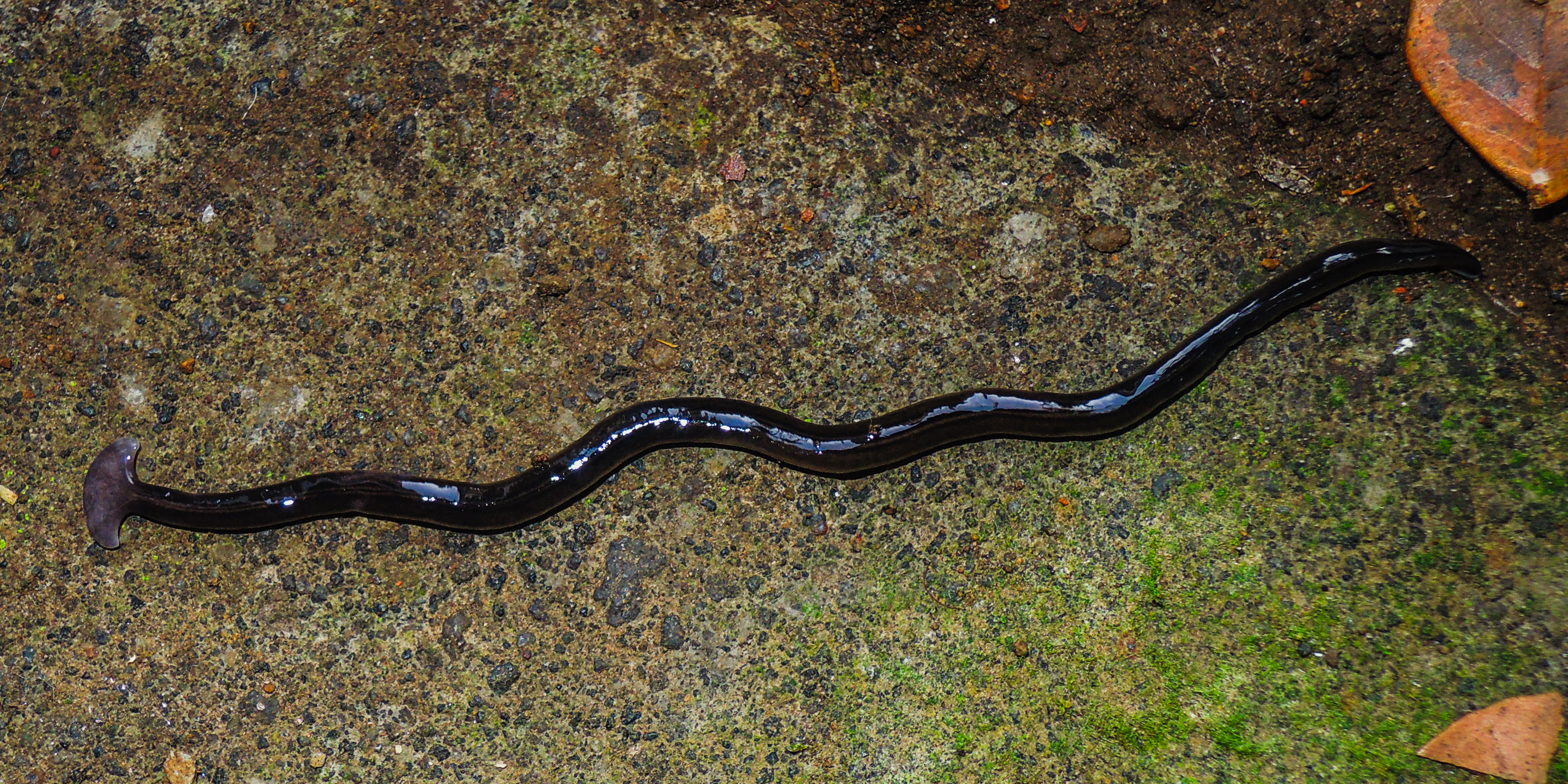
Bipalium javanum in Java, Indonesia.
