= Cratera taxiarcha =

Scientific classification
- Kingdom: Animalia
- Phylum: Platyhelminthes
- Order: Tricladida
- Family: Geoplanidae
- Genus: Cratera
- Species: C. taxiarcha

Binomial name
- Cratera taxiarcha (Marcus, 1951)

Synonyms
- Geoplana taxiarcha Marcus, 1951

Species of flatworm

Cratera taxiarcha is a species of land planarian belonging to the subfamily Geoplaninae. It is known from specimens found in Albert Löfgren State Park and Cantareira State Park in Brazil.

== Description ==
Cratera taxiarcha is a flatworm that can reach up to 70 mm in length and around 6 mm in width. The body is wide and slightly lanceolate, with a rounded front tip and pointed back tip. The dorsal side of the body has a white midline with scattered black spots, flanked on both sides by two paramedian black lines with irregular, spotted margins, made up of dense black spots. Additionally, there are two yellow marginal lines with black spots scattered within them. The ventral side of the body is a whitish color.

Aside from its size and coloration, it is distinguished from other members of Cratera by having dorsal eyes that initiate in the head region, a bifurcated and extrabulbar proximal portion of the prostatic vesicle that is detached from the penis bulb, a well-developed penis bulb that extends 0.5 mm anterior to the penis papilla, a strong muscular cylinder surrounding the ejaculatory duct with a diameter twice that of the duct, the dorsal portion of the male atrium being pierced by several cyanophil glands, the male atrium being twice as long as the female, and the lack of a common glandular ovovitelline duct.
