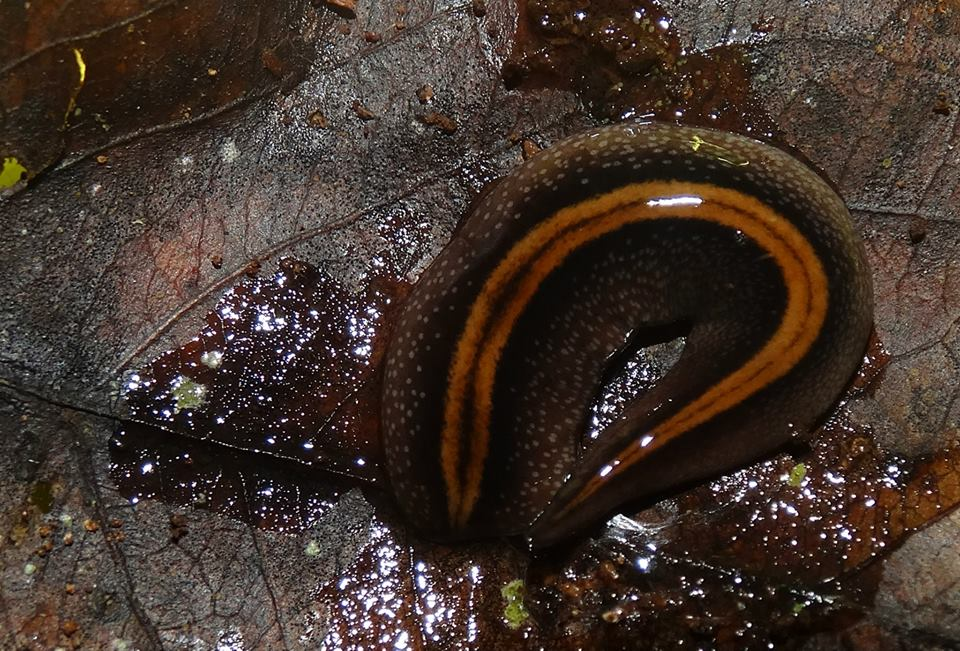

Scientific classification
- Kingdom: Animalia
- Phylum: Platyhelminthes
- Order: Tricladida
- Family: Geoplanidae
- Genus: Paraparaba
- Species: P. impositrix

Binomial name
- Paraparaba impositrix Rossi, Boll & Leal-Zanchet, 2024

Synonyms
- Geoplana multicolor sensu Marcus, 1951; Paraba multicolor (Graff, 1899) Carbayo et al., 2013

= Paraparaba impositrix =

Species of flatworm

Paraparaba impositrix is a species of land planarian belonging to the subfamily Geoplaninae. It is found in areas of Atlantic Forest of Brazil and Argentina.

== Description ==
Paraparaba impositrix has a dark-brown to black dorsal color with a ferruginous or brownish band, sometimes with a dark median stripe running inside it. It has many dorsal eyes surrounded by clear halos, which appear as light dots.

== Taxonomy ==
Ernst Marcus first described Paraparaba impositrix in 1951, but misidentified it as Geoplana multicolor, a species described by Ludwig von Graff in 1899. During the following decades, the species continued to be erroneously associated with Geoplana multicolor and even became the type-species of a new genus, Paraba, in 2013. A recent analysis of the original material used by von Graff to describe Geoplana multicolor revealed that they are not conspecific and von Graff's specimen actually has the diagnostic features of the genus Geoplana as currently defined. As a result, Paraba became a junior synonym of Geoplana and a new genus, Paraparaba was created for species previously in Paraba. The species described by Marcus thus also received a new name, Paraparaba impositrix.
