= Paraba aurantia =

Scientific classification
- Kingdom: Animalia
- Phylum: Platyhelminthes
- Order: Tricladida
- Family: Geoplanidae
- Genus: Paraparaba
- Species: P. aurantia

Binomial name
- Paraba aurantia Marques & Leal-Zanchet, 2022

Species of flatworm

Paraba aurantia is a species of land planarian belonging to the subfamily Geoplaninae. It is found within Brazil.

== Description ==
Paraba aurantia has an elongated body with parallel margins, with a rounded anterior tip and a pointed posterior tip. It can reach up to 30 mm in length. The dorsum is an orangish color with a wide black band running down the middle, not reaching the body's tips. The ventral side of the body is a pale yellow with orangish margins. The anterior tip is contoured by small brownish spots. The eyes, when monolobate, surround the anterior tip and run down the body margins, with bilobated eyes spread across the whole dorsum.

P. aurantia lacks a glandular margin. The pharynx is cylindrical in shape, and the esophagus is long. The prostatic vesicle is tubular and twisted; the distal portion of the vesicle is C-shaped. The female cavity is an oval-elongate shape with an ample lumen, lined by a layered epithelium.

== Etymology ==
The specific epithet is derived from the Latin aurantius, meaning tawny or orange-colored, in reference to the species' orangish dorsum.

== Distribution ==
Paraba aurantia is only known to be found in Atlantic semi-deciduous forests within the Brazilian municipalities of Bonito and Bodoquena in the state of Mato Grosso do Sul.
