= Paraba iguassuensis =

Scientific classification
- Kingdom: Animalia
- Phylum: Platyhelminthes
- Order: Tricladida
- Family: Geoplanidae
- Genus: Paraparaba
- Species: P. iguassuensis

Binomial name
- Paraba iguassuensis Peres, Rossi & Leal-Zanchet, 2020

Species of flatworm

Paraba iguassuensis is a species of land planarian belonging to the subfamily Geoplaninae. It is found within Brazil.

== Description ==
Paraba iguassuensis has an elongated body with parallel margins that can reach up to 28 mm in length. Both ends of the body are rounded. The dorsum is a dark brown-to-black color, with a light yellow or green stripe running down the middle, and greyish margins. The anterior tip may be reddish. The ventral side of the body is light brown or light grey.

The pharynx is cylindrical. The prostatic vesicle has a globose proximal portion with folded walls and a broad lumen, and a short tubular distal portion. The penis papilla is cylindrical, and the common glandular ovovitelline duct is long.

== Etymology ==
The specific epithet is derived from the type locality of the species, which is in the Iguassu River Drainage Basin.
