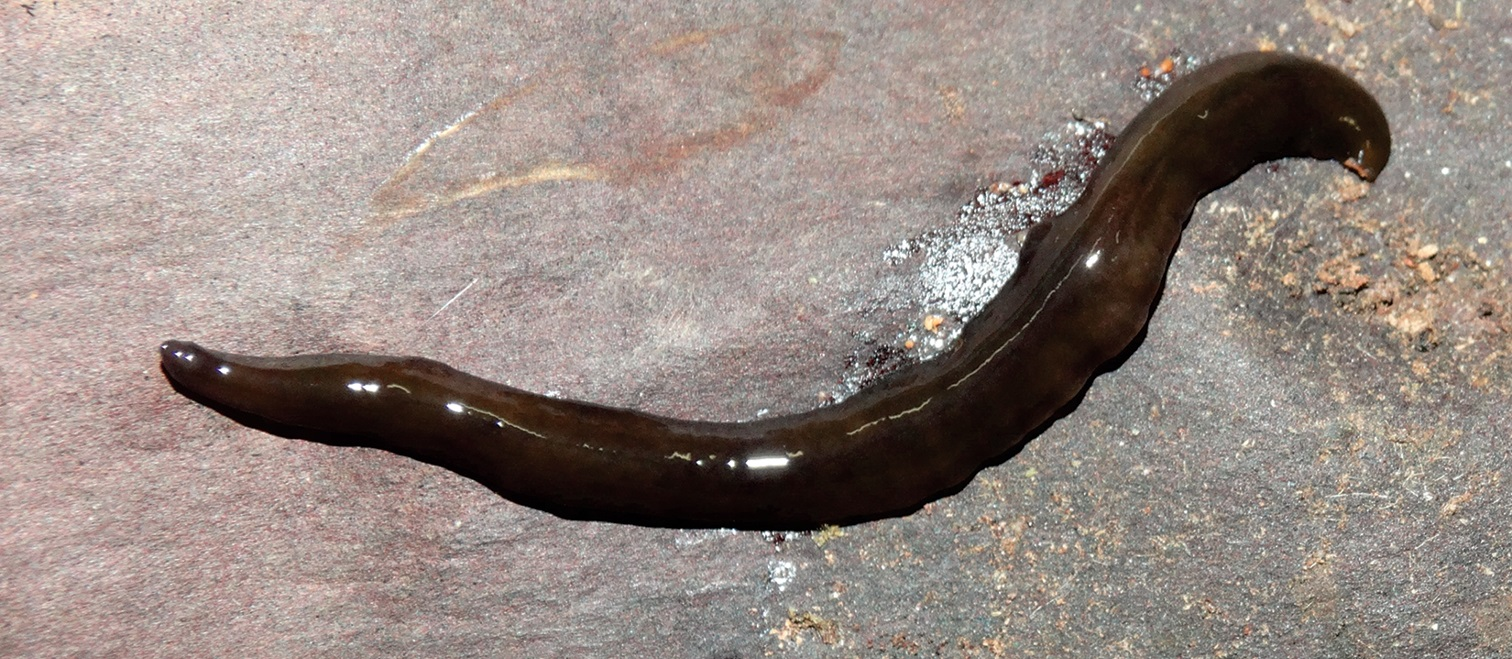

Scientific classification
- Kingdom: Animalia
- Phylum: Platyhelminthes
- Order: Tricladida
- Family: Geoplanidae
- Genus: Cratera
- Species: C. cryptolineata

Binomial name
- Cratera cryptolineata Rossi & Leal-Zanchet, 2017

= Cratera cryptolineata =

Species of flatworm

Cratera cryptolineata is a species of land planarian found in Brazil.

== Description ==
Cratera cryptolineata is a medium-sized land planarian with a lanceolate body, reaching about 50 millimetres (2.0 in) in length. The color of the dorsum is homogeneously dark brown with a thin median stripe occurring along the body that is only visible under the stereomicroscope. The ventral side is light brown.

The several eyes of C. cryptolineata are distributed marginally in the first millimeters of the body and posteriorly become dorsal, occupying around one third of the body width.

Aside from coloration, C. cryptolineata can be distinguished from other members of Cratera by the clear halos of its eyes, a cylindrical pharynx, an almost horizontal prostatic vesicle, and a conical, symmetrical penis papilla that occupies the distal portion of the female atrium.

== Etymology ==
The specific epithet cryptolineata comes from Greek κρυπτός (kryptos), hidden + Latin lineata, striped, and refers to the thin media stripe visible under the stereomicroscope.

== Distribution ==
Cratera cryptolineata is known only from the Três Barras National Forest, Santa Catarina, Brazil.
