= Cratera crioula =

Scientific classification
- Kingdom: Animalia
- Phylum: Platyhelminthes
- Order: Tricladida
- Family: Geoplanidae
- Genus: Cratera
- Species: C. crioula

Binomial name
- Cratera crioula (Froehlich, 1955) Carbayo et al., 2013

Species of flatworm

Cratera crioula is a species of land planarian belonging to the subfamily Geoplaninae. It is known from specimens found in Cantareira State Park, Brazil.

== Description ==
Cratera crioula is a flatworm that is, on average, around 40 mm long; it can reach up to 60 mm in length and 6 mm in width. The body is lanceolate, with parallel margins; the front end of the body is rounded, while the back end is pointed. The dorsal side of the body is covered in dark brownish-black spots, except for a thin median stripe and two submarginal stripes on each side of the body, which are a cream base color. The ventral side is a cream color as well, becoming greyish as it approaches the front end.

Aside from its size and coloration, it is distinguished from other members of Cratera by dorsal eyes initiating in the head region, the proximal portion of the prostatic vesicle being bifurcated, extrabulbar, and detached from the penis bulb, the penis bulb extending 0.5 mm anteriorly to the penis papilla, an ejaculatory duct that may be distally widened, the dorsal insertion of the penis papilla being slightly anterior to the ventral one, the penis papilla projecting into the female atrium, a male atrium that is twice as big as the female atrium, and the presence of a common glandular duct.

== Etymology ==
The specific epithet is likely derived from the Portuguese word crioula, meaning "Creole", though this is unspecified in the original description by Eudóxia Maria Froehlich.
