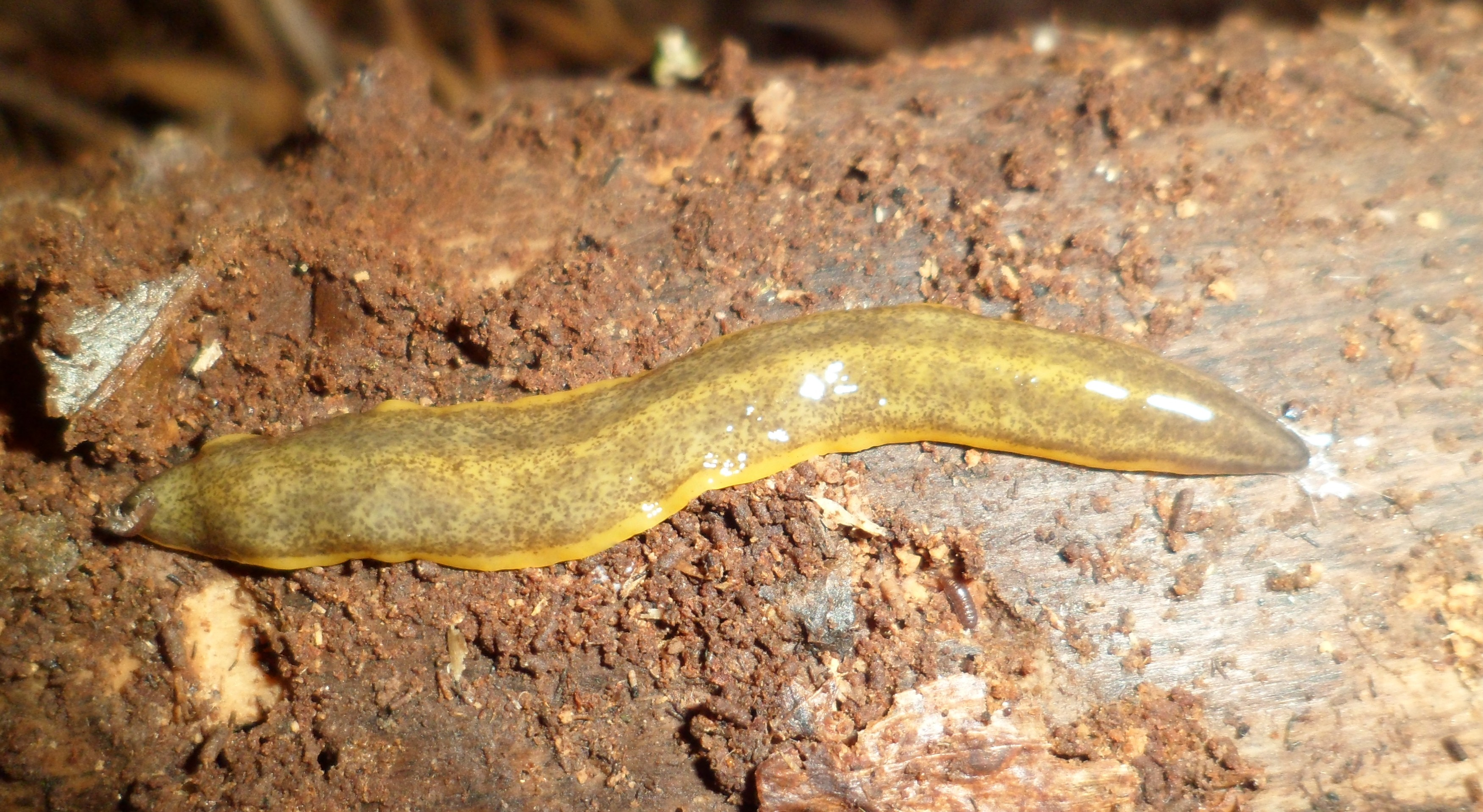
- In São Francisco de Paula National Forest

Scientific classification
- Kingdom: Animalia
- Phylum: Platyhelminthes
- Order: Tricladida
- Family: Geoplanidae
- Genus: Cratera
- Species: C. ochra

Binomial name
- Cratera ochra Rossi, Amaral, Ribeiro, Cauduro, Fick, Valiati & Leal-Zanchet, 2015

= Cratera ochra =

Species of flatworm

Cratera ochra is a species of land planarian in the subfamily Geoplaninae. It is found in Brazil.

== Description ==
Cratera ochra is a medium-sized land planarian with a lanceolate body, reaching up to 85 millimetres (3.3 in) in length. The dorsum is yellow-ochre in colour, covered with a dispersed greyish to greyish-brown pigmentation that forms two diffuse and irregular longitudinal bands, and two paramarginal longitudinal stripes that are slightly darker than the bands. The ventral side is pale-yellow.

The several eyes of C. ochra are distributed marginally in the first few millimetres of the body and posteriorly become dorsal, occupying around 40% of the body width on each side at the meddle third of the body.

Aside from its colouration and dorsal eyes, C. ochra is distinguished from other members of Cratera by a glandular margin with four or more types of glands, a cylindrical pharynx, an extrabulbar prostatic vesicle with an ample, expanded proximal portion and a tubular distal portion, and ovovitelline ducts that emerge dorsally from the middle of the ovaries and ascend anterior to the gonopore.

== Etymology ==
The specific epithet ochra refers to the yellow-ochre color of the animal's dorsum.

== Distribution ==
The habitat of C. ochra includes moist forests in northeast Rio Grande do Sul, southern Brazil, as well as plantations of Araucaria angustifolia and Pinus spp.
