= Paraba smaragdina =

Scientific classification
- Kingdom: Animalia
- Phylum: Platyhelminthes
- Order: Tricladida
- Family: Geoplanidae
- Genus: Paraparaba
- Species: P. smaragdina

Binomial name
- Paraba smaragdina Rossi, Negrete & Leal Zanchet, 2020

Species of flatworm

Paraba smaragdina is a species of land planarian belonging to the subfamily Geoplaninae. It is found within Brazil.

== Description ==
Paraba smaragdina has an elongated body with parallel margins that can reach up to 25 mm in length. Both ends of the body are rounded. The dorsum is a dark green-to-brown color, with a slightly reddish anterior tip. The ventral side of the body is light gray or light brown.

The pharynx is cylindrical. The prostatic vesicle has an oval, elongated proximal portion with folded walls and a narrow lumen, and a tubular, sinuous distal portion. The penis papilla is conical, and the common glandular ovovitelline duct is long. There is constriction between the male and female cavities.

== Etymology ==
The specific epithet is derived from the Latin smaragdus, meaning "emerald", in reference to the holotype's emerald green color.
