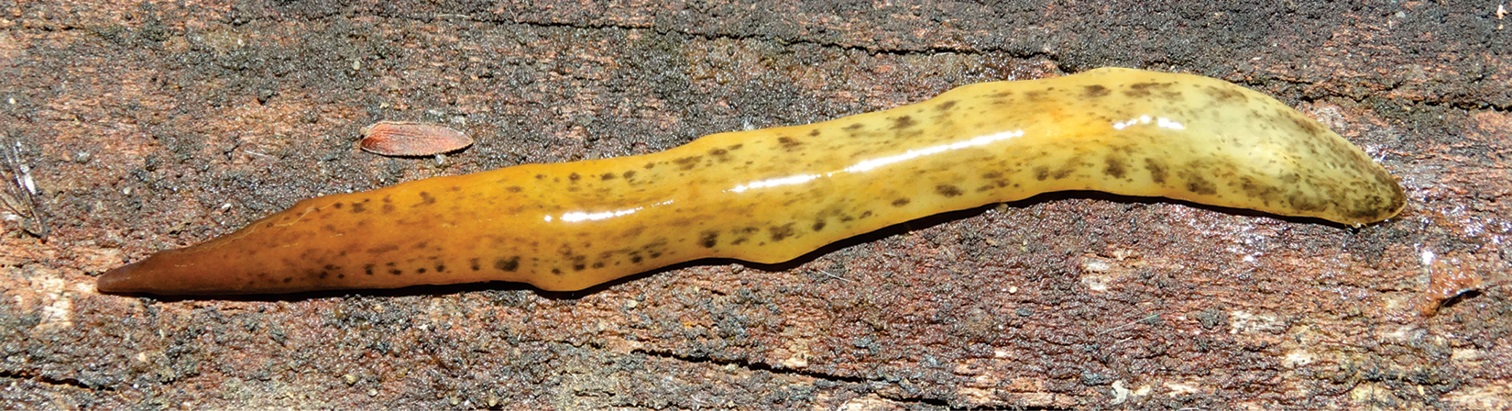

Scientific classification
- Kingdom: Animalia
- Phylum: Platyhelminthes
- Order: Tricladida
- Family: Geoplanidae
- Genus: Cratera
- Species: C. aureomaculata

Binomial name
- Cratera aureomaculata Rossi & Leal-Zanchet, 2017

= Cratera aureomaculata =

Species of flatworm

Cratera aureomaculata is a species of land planarian from Brazil.

== Description ==
Cratera aureomaculata is a medium-sized land planarian with an elongate body with parallel margins and slightly convex dorsal surface. It reaches about 50 mm (2.0 in) in length. The dorsum has a yellow background that is covered by brown pigmentation in the anterior region. There are blackish pigmentation forming irregular flecks over the dorsal surface, being larger laterally and becoming more concentrates towards the posterior tip. The venter is light grey with yellowish margins, becoming brownish with darker margins in the anterior region.

The several eyes of C. aureomaculata are distributed marginally in the first millimeters of the body and posteriorly become dorsal, occupying about one third of the body width on each side and becoming less numerous towards the anterior tip.

Aside from coloration, C. aureomaculata is distinguished from other members of the genus Cratera by having clear halos of its eyes, a cylindrical pharynx, a T-shaped, ventrally displaced prostatic vesicle, and a conical penis papilla that is symmetrical with the ventral insertion.

== Etymology ==
The specific epithet aureomaculata comes from Latin aureus, golden + maculata, spotted, flecked, thus meaning "golden flecked" and refers to the yellowish background color covered by irregular black flecks.

== Distribution ==
Cratera aureomaculata is known only from the Três Barras National Forest, Santa Catarina, Brazil.
