= Cratera obsidiana =

Scientific classification
- Kingdom: Animalia
- Phylum: Platyhelminthes
- Order: Tricladida
- Family: Geoplanidae
- Genus: Cratera
- Species: C. obsidiana

Binomial name
- Cratera obsidiana Amaral, Boll & Leal-Zanchet, 2019

Species of flatworm

Cratera obsidiana is a species of land planarian belonging to the subfamily Geoplaninae. It is known from specimens found in the Turvo State Park in Brazil.

== Description ==
Cratera obsidiana is a flatworm that can reach up to 40 mm in length. The body is elongate with parallel margins; the front tip is rounded and the back tip is pointed. The dorsal side of the body is a uniform black color, while the ventral side is a light grey.

Aside from its coloration, it is distinguished from other members of Cratera by having a posteriorly-shifted cylindrical pharynx and an extrabulbar prostatic vesicle with a T-shaped, dorsally oriented proximal portion.

== Etymology ==
The specific epithet is derived from the volcanic rock obsidian, as the glossy black color of the species resembles that of the stone.
