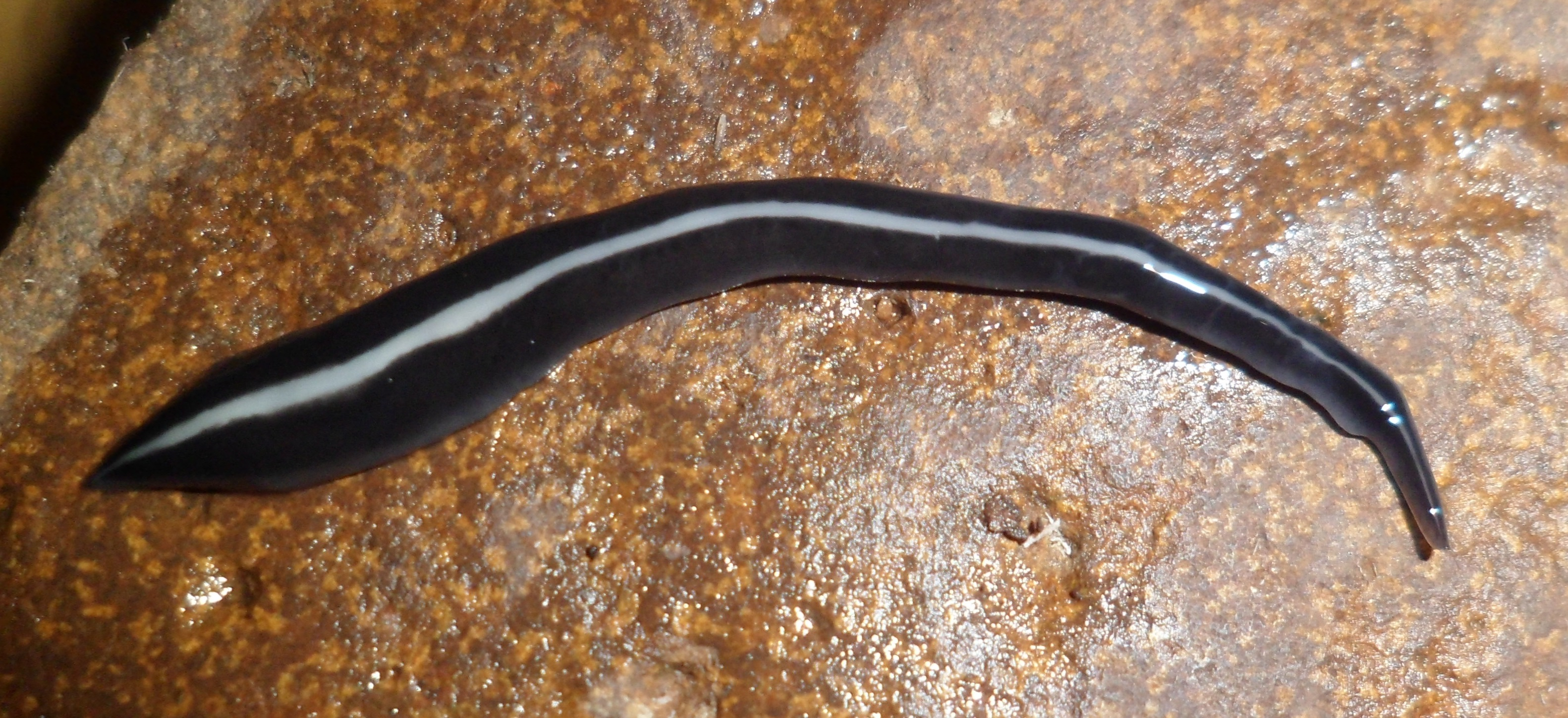
- Head on the right

Scientific classification
- Kingdom: Animalia
- Phylum: Platyhelminthes
- Order: Tricladida
- Family: Geoplanidae
- Genus: Paraparaba
- Species: P. franciscana

Binomial name
- Paraparaba franciscana (Leal-Zanchet & Carbayo, 2001)

Synonyms
- Geoplana franciscana Leal-Zanchet & Carbayo, 2001; Paraba franciscana Carbayo et al., 2013

= Paraparaba franciscana =

Species of flatworm

Paraparaba franciscana is a species of land planarian found in Brazil.

== Description ==
Paraba franciscana is a medium-sized land planarian with an elongated body reaching up to 80 millimetres (3.1 in) in length and 2 millimetres (0.079 in) in width while crawling. The dorsal surface has a homogeneously dark-grey to black color with a white median longitudinal stripe of about 8 to 12% of the body width. The ventral side is white to light-grey, usually with a median longitudinal light-grey stripe. The numerous eyes are distributed in a single row along the body margins in the first millimetres and posteriorly spread to the dorsum, usually occupying up to 30% of the body width on each side, but some eyes can be close to the median line.

== Etymology ==
The specific epithet franciscana makes references to the municipality of São Francisco de Paula, where the species was first found.

== Distribution ==
Paraparaba franciscana is known from areas covered by Araucaria moist forest in northeast Rio Grande do Sul, southern Brazil. It occurs in the São Francisco de Paula National Forest and in the Aparados da Serra National Park.
