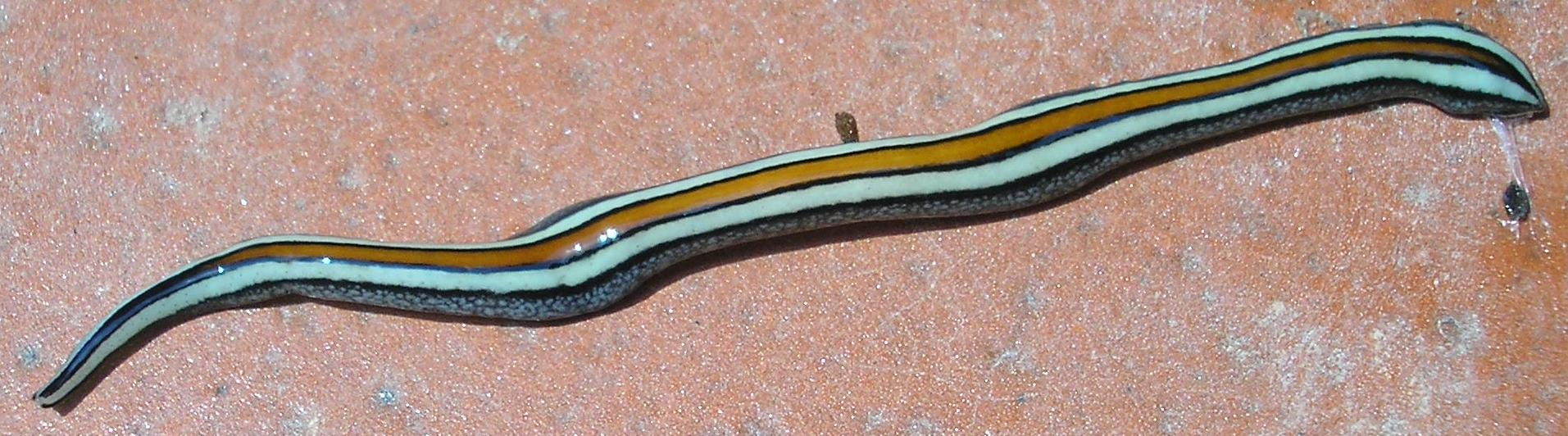
- Geoplana cambara

Scientific classification
- Kingdom: Animalia
- Phylum: Platyhelminthes
- Order: Tricladida
- Family: Geoplanidae
- Subfamily: Geoplaninae
- Genus: Geoplana; Stimpson, 1857

Type species
- Planaria vaginuloides Darwin, 1844

= Geoplana =

Genus of flatworms

Geoplana is a genus of land planarians from South America.

== Taxonomic history ==
The genus Geoplana was erected in 1857 by William Stimpson and included most land planarians with several eyes distributed along the body. Species with only two eyes were placed in the genus Rhynchodemus, while species with a crescent-shaped head were placed in Bipalium.

In the same year, apparently unaware of Stimpson's paper, the naturalist Max Schultze, based on published information and new species collected in Brazil by the naturalist Fritz Müller, also erected a genus named Geoplana, but included all land planarians in it. However, Stimpson's system prevailed.

During most of the 20th century, many new land planarian species, mostly from Australia and South America, were placed in Geoplana. In 1955, Eudóxia Maria Froehlich defined that Geoplana vaginuloides would be the type-species of Geoplana, as it was the first species listed by Stimpson.

In 1990, Robert E. Ogren and Masaharu Kawakatsu published a review of the classification of land planarians and divided Geoplana in four genera: Geoplana, Gigantea, Notogynaphallia and Pasipha. Geoplana retained all species with dorsal testes, a protrusible penis and a female canal entering the genital antrum dorsally. Species with ventral testes, without a protrusible penis or with a female canal entering the genital antrum ventrally were placed in other genera.

During the 21st century, molecular studies revealed that Geoplana sensu Ogren & Kawakatsu was still heterogeneous. A study published in 2013 by Carbayo et al., based on molecular data, divided Geoplana in 6 genera: Geoplana, Barreirana, Cratera, Matuxia, Obama, and Paraba. Only three species remained as Geoplana, along with several incertae sedis. By a revision of the three valid species, the number increased to thirteen, mostly by the discovery that the type-species, Geoplana vaginuloides was a complex of species.

== Current description ==
Currently, the genus Geoplana is characterized by having the features described by Ogren & Kawatasu (dorsal testes, a protrusible penis and a female canal entering the genital antrum dorsally) plus several others, such as a slender body with nearly parallel margins, a strongly convex dorsum, monolobulated eyes (i.e., simple and circular, with only one lobe), a strong muscle tube around the intestine, a very long and muscular penis papilla, and the lack of a prostatic vesicle.

== Species ==
There are currently only thirteen species certainly belonging to Geoplana:

- Geoplana apua Almeida & Carbayo, 2018
- Geoplana boraceia Almeida & Carbayo, 2018
- Geoplana cambara Almeida & Carbayo, 2018
- Geoplana cananeia Almeida & Carbayo, 2018
- Geoplana caraguatatuba Almeida & Carbayo, 2018
- Geoplana chita Froehlich, 1956
- Geoplana ibiuna Almeida & Carbayo, 2018
- Geoplana iporanga Almeida & Carbayo, 2018
- Geoplana mogi Almeida & Carbayo, 2018
- Geoplana paranapiacaba Almeida & Carbayo, 2018
- Geoplana piratininga Almeida & Carbayo, 2018
- Geoplana pulchella Schultze & Müller, 1857
- Geoplana vaginuloides (Darwin, 1844)

Also, there are several species currently considered incertae sedis:

- Geoplana alterfusca Hyman, 1962
- Geoplana arkalabamensis Ogren & Darlington, 1991
- Geoplana aymara du Bois-Reymond Marcus, 1951
- Geoplana beckeri Froehlich, 1959
- Geoplana bimbergi Fuhrmann, 1914
- Geoplana caleta E. M. Froehlich 1978
- Geoplana cantuta du Bois-Reymond Marcus, 1951
- Geoplana caucaensis Fuhrmann, 1914
- Geoplana caya du Bois-Reymond Marcus, 1951
- Geoplana chalona du Bois-Reymond Marcus, 1951
- Geoplana chilihua du Bois-Reymond Marcus, 1951
- Geoplana chiuna E. M. Froehlich, 1955b
- Geoplana chulpa du Bois-Reymond Marcus, 1951
- Geoplana crawfordi de Beauchamp, 1939
- Geoplana excellentissima Negrete, Brusa & Damborenea, 2012
- Geoplana fragai Froehlich, 1955b
- Geoplana fuhrmanni Hyman, 1962
- Geoplana gabriellae du Bois-Reymond Marcus, 1951
- Geoplana goetschi Riester, 1938
- Geoplana guacensis Fuhrmann, 1914
- Geoplana irua du Bois-Reymond Marcus, 1958
- Geoplana jandira Froehlich, 1955c
- Geoplana lama du Bois-Reymond Marcus, 1957
- Geoplana lambaya du Bois-Reymond Marcus, 1958
- Geoplana lareta du Bois-Reymond Marcus, 1958
- Geoplana mayori Fuhrmann, 1914
- Geoplana mirim E. M. Froehlich, 1972
- Geoplana mixopulla Ogren & Kawakatsu, 1990
- Geoplana multipunctata Fuhrmann, 1914
- Geoplana pavani Marcus, 1951
- Geoplana pichuna du Bois-Reymond Marcus, 1951
- Geoplana picta Froehlich, 1956a
- Geoplana placilla E. M. Froehlich, 1978
- Geoplana quagga Marcus, 1951
- Geoplana quenua du Bois-Reymond Marcus, 1958
- Geoplana quichua Marcus, 1951
- Geoplana regia E. M. Froehlich, 1955b
- Geoplana saima du Bois-Reymond Marcus, 1951
- Geoplana shapra du Bois-Reymond Marcus, 1957
- Geoplana takia du Bois-Reymond Marcus, 1951
- Geoplana talpa du Bois-Reymond Marcus, 1951
- Geoplana tamboensis Fuhrmann, 1914
- Geoplana toriba Froehlich, 1958
- Geoplana ubaquensis Fuhrmann, 1914
- Geoplana vicuna du Bois-Reymond Marcus, 1957
