= Paraba tata =

Scientific classification
- Kingdom: Animalia
- Phylum: Platyhelminthes
- Order: Tricladida
- Family: Geoplanidae
- Genus: Paraparaba
- Species: P. tata

Binomial name
- Paraba tata Bolonhezi, Lago-Barcia & Carbayo, 2020

Species of flatworm

Paraba tata is a species of land planarian belonging to the subfamily Geoplaninae. It is found within Brazil.

== Description ==
Paraba tata has a body about 22 mm in length with parallel margins, a rounded anterior, and a pointed posterior. The dorsum is a dark orange-brown color, with orange body margins. Across the length of the dorsum, aside from the extremities, there is a narrow clear gray stripe. The ventral side of the body is an ivory color.

== Etymology ==
The specific epithet is derived from a Tupi language word meaning "fire"; this is in reference to the dorsum's orangeish color.

== Distribution ==
P. tata is currently only known from type specimens found in Intervales State Park, near the municipality of Ribeirão Grande, São Paulo, Brazil.
