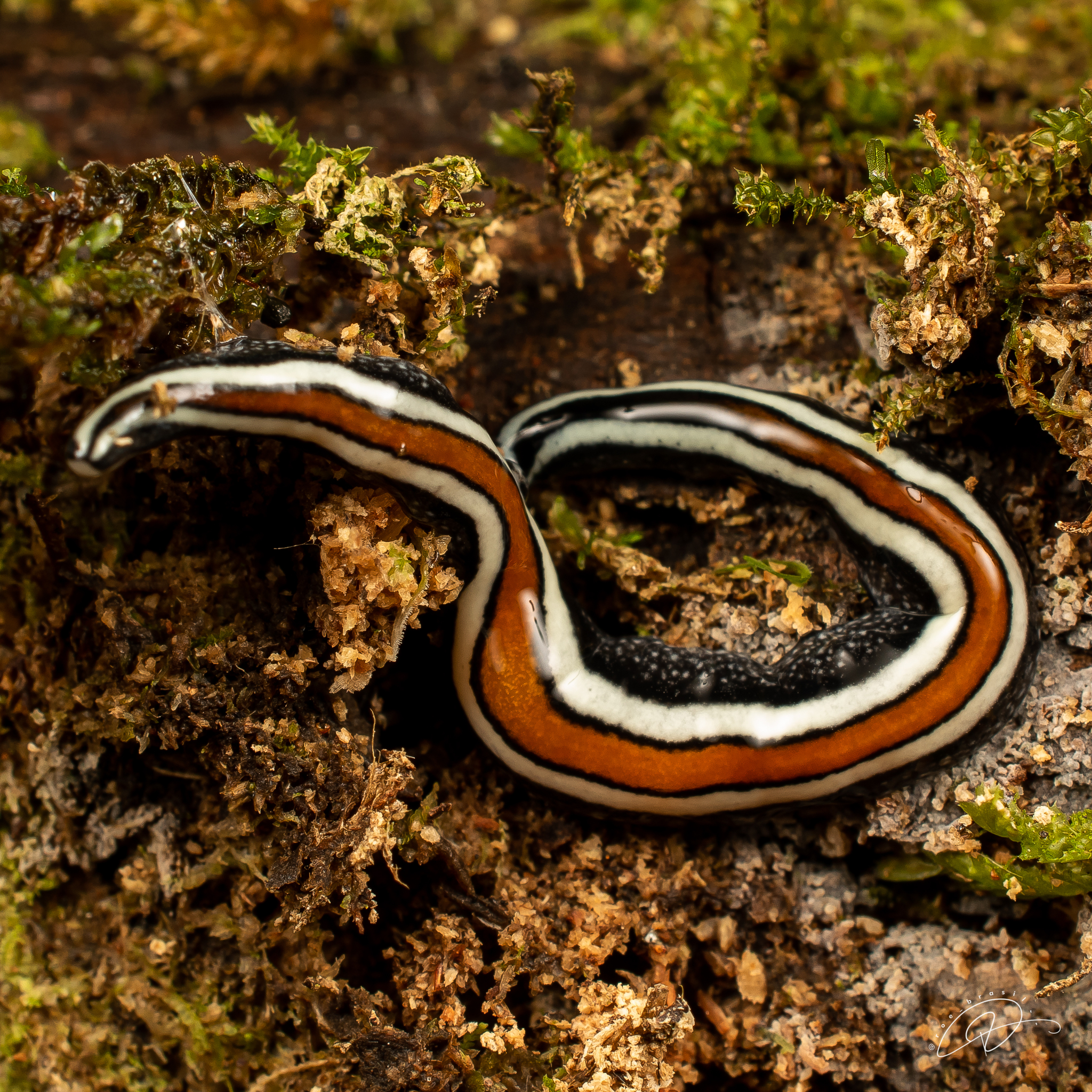

Scientific classification
- Kingdom: Animalia
- Phylum: Platyhelminthes
- Order: Tricladida
- Family: Geoplanidae
- Genus: Geoplana
- Species: G. paranapiacaba

Binomial name
- Geoplana paranapiacaba Almeida, Marques & Carbayo, 2019

= Geoplana paranapiacaba =

Species of flatworm

Geoplana paranapiacaba is a species of land planarian belonging to the subfamily Geoplaninae. It is known from specimens found in the Paranapiacaba district of Santo André, Brazil.

== Description ==
Geoplana paranapiacaba is a flatworm around 50 mm in length and 4 mm in width. The body has parallel margins; the front tip is rounded and the back tip is pointed. The dorsal side has an orange-ochre stripe running down the middle, bounded on each side by a black line; the line is bordered by a broader white line, which is in turn bordered by a black stripe, which is then bordered by a grey stripe with white mottling. A marginal thin black line borders the grey stripe. The ventral side is a whitish color with blackish margins.

Aside from its coloration, it is distinguished from other members of Geoplana by the diameter of the muscular cylinder surrounding the ejaculatory duct being 0.5 times that of the duct, and a female-to-male atrium length ratio of 3.5–4.

== Etymology ==
The specific epithet is derived from the type locality of Paranapiacaba.
