= Geoplana mogi =

Scientific classification
- Kingdom: Animalia
- Phylum: Platyhelminthes
- Order: Tricladida
- Family: Geoplanidae
- Genus: Geoplana
- Species: G. mogi

Binomial name
- Geoplana mogi Almeida, Marques & Carbayo, 2019

Species of flatworm

Geoplana mogi is a species of land planarian belonging to the subfamily Geoplaninae. It is found in areas within the Atlantic Forest in the municipalities of São Paulo and Mogi das Cruzes, Brazil.

== Description ==
Geoplana mogi is a flatworm around 50 millimetres (2.0 in) in length and 4 millimetres (0.16 in) in width. The body has parallel margins; the front tip is rounded and the back tip is pointed. The dorsal side has a medium orange-ochre band running down the middle, flanked on each side by a thin whitish stripe; the whitish stripe is bordered on the outside by a black line, which is flanked by a grey band mottled with white. A marginal black line borders the grey band. The marginal band is often hidden from plain dorsal view due to the shape of the body. The ventral side is a whitish color with blackish margins.

Aside from its coloration, it is distinguished from other members of Geoplana by having parenchymal muscle fibres that form a loose tube around the intestine, and the diameter of the muscular cylinder surrounding the ejaculatory duct being 1.3 times that of the duct.

== Etymology ==
The specific epithet, mogi, is derived from the type locality of Mogi das Cruzes, specifically the Tupi language name of the municipality.
