= Cratera tui =

Scientific classification
- Kingdom: Animalia
- Phylum: Platyhelminthes
- Order: Tricladida
- Family: Geoplanidae
- Genus: Cratera
- Species: C. tui

Binomial name
- Cratera tui Araujo, Carbayo, Riutort & Álvarez-Presas, 2020

Species of flatworm

Cratera tui is a species of land planarian belonging to the subfamily Geoplaninae. It is found in Serra da Bocaina National Park and Itatiaia National Park in Brazil.

== Description ==
Cratera tui is a flatworm around 45–70 mm in length and 7 mm in width. The body is slightly lanceolate, with parallel margins, a rounded front tip, and a pointed back tip. The body is widest at the pharynx, with a gradual narrowing towards the front and an abrupt narrowing towards the back tip. The dorsal side of the body has a melon yellow median stripe that is bordered on both sides by a jet black stripe. Outside of the jet black stripes are traffic white marginal stripes. The body margin is jet black. The front of the body fades into a carmine red color. The ventral side of the body is grey-white.

Aside from its coloration and length, it is distinguished from other members of Cratera by having marginal eyes, a cylindrical pharynx, a pharyngeal pouch that is 0.6 mm anterior to the prostatic vesicle, a penis papilla that is shorter than the male atrium, a relatively small distal dilation of the ejaculatory duct, a female atrium that is 2.5 times longer than the male, and the presence of a long common glandular ovovitelline duct.

== Etymology ==
The specific epithet is derived from the Tupi language word tui, "tiny, insignificant", in reference to the small size of the ejaculatory duct's distal dilation.
