= Cratera assu =

Scientific classification
- Kingdom: Animalia
- Phylum: Platyhelminthes
- Order: Tricladida
- Family: Geoplanidae
- Genus: Cratera
- Species: C. assu

Binomial name
- Cratera assu Araujo, Carbayo, Riutort & Álvarez-Presas, 2020

Species of flatworm

Cratera assu is a species of land planarian belonging to the subfamily Geoplaninae. It is known from specimens found in Serra da Bocaina National Park in Brazil.

== Description ==
Cratera assu is a flatworm around 50–65 mm in length and 3–3.5 mm in width. The body is elongate and slightly lanceolated, with a rounded front tip, and a pointed back tip. Widest at the pharynx, the body narrows towards the front and back. The dorsal side of the body can vary in color from chestnut brown to black-brown. In the front tenth of the body, there is a submarginal stripe that is yellow-orange or grayish in color; towards the back, this stripe is marginal. The submarginal stripe is inconspicuous in some individuals. Some individuals have a thin grayish midline. The ventral side of the body can range from sand yellow to light ivory in color.

Aside from its coloration and length, it is distinguished from other members of Cratera by having dorsal eyes, a bell-shaped pharynx, a horizontal penis papilla, a widened distal portion of the ejaculatory duct that occupies most of the penis papilla, and the lack of a common glandular ovovitelline duct.

== Etymology ==
The specific epithet is derived from the Tupi language word assu, "large", in reference to the large size of the ejaculatory duct's distal dilation.
