= Cratera boja =

Scientific classification
- Kingdom: Animalia
- Phylum: Platyhelminthes
- Order: Tricladida
- Family: Geoplanidae
- Genus: Cratera
- Species: C. boja

Binomial name
- Cratera boja Araujo, Carbayo, Riutort & Álvarez-Presas, 2020

Species of flatworm

Cratera boja is a species of land planarian belonging to the subfamily Geoplaninae. It is known from specimens found in Serra da Bocaina National Park in Brazil.

== Description ==
Cratera boja is a flatworm around 34 mm in length and 4–4.5 mm in width. The body is elongate, with parallel margins, a rounded front tip, and a pointed back tip. The dorsal side of the body is an olive gray base color, spotted with black patches. The patches concentrate in a median band that may be divided by a thin midline. The ventral side of the body is olive gray, turning gray at the front end.

Aside from its coloration and length, it is distinguished from other members of Cratera by having marginal eyes, a bell-shaped pharynx, the distal portion of the ejaculatory duct being widened to occupy around half of the penis papilla, a narrowing that separates the male and female atria, a postero-dorsally oriented penis papilla that is shorter than the male atrium, a prostatic vesicle with an inverted-U shape in a lateral view, several cyanophil cell necks that pierce the male atrium roof, a female atrium that is half the length of the male, and the lack of a common glandular ovovitelline duct.

== Etymology ==
The specific epithet is derived from the Tupi language word boja, "intermediate, middle", in reference to the intermediate size of the ejaculatory duct's distal dilation.
