= Imbiri =

Imbiri is a surname. Notable people with the surname include:

- Fandry Imbiri (born 1992), Indonesian footballer
- Steven Imbiri (born 1987), Indonesian footballer

== See also ==
- Cratera imbiri, species of land planarian
