= Geoplana iporanga =

Scientific classification
- Kingdom: Animalia
- Phylum: Platyhelminthes
- Order: Tricladida
- Family: Geoplanidae
- Genus: Geoplana
- Species: G. iporanga

Binomial name
- Geoplana iporanga Almeida, Marques & Carbayo, 2019

Species of flatworm

Geoplana iporanga is a species of land planarian belonging to the subfamily Geoplaninae. It is found in areas of the Atlantic Forest within Intervales State Park in Brazil.

== Description ==
Geoplana iporanga is a flatworm around 50 mm in length and 4 mm in width. The body has parallel margins; the front tip is rounded and the back tip is pointed. The dorsal side has a melon yellow band running down the middle, which is flanked on each side by a black band, which is in turn bordered by a white band. The white band is longitudinally halved by a black line which fades as it approaches the posterior end. The ventral side is a white color with blackish margins.

Along with its coloration, it can be distinguished from other members of Geoplana by a 2 mm anterior extension of the penis bulb from the penis papilla, sperm ducts that join inside the penis papilla, and a muscular cylinder around the ejaculatory duct with a diameter that is ten times that of the duct.

== Etymology ==
The specific epithet is derived from the municipality of Iporanga, which is within Intervales State Park, the species' type locality.
