= Cratera steffeni =

Scientific classification
- Kingdom: Animalia
- Phylum: Platyhelminthes
- Order: Tricladida
- Family: Geoplanidae
- Genus: Cratera
- Species: C. steffeni

Binomial name
- Cratera steffeni Rossi, Fontoura, Amaral & Leal-Zanchet, 2014

Species of flatworm

Cratera steffeni is a species of land planarian belonging to the subfamily Geoplaninae. It is found in Rio Grande do Sul, Brazil.

== Description ==
Cratera steffeni is a flatworm that can reach up to 70 mm in length and 4 mm in width. The body is elongate with parallel margins; the front tip is rounded and the back tip is pointed. The dorsal side of the body has a broad orange band flanked on either side by black paramarginal stripes. The dorsal base color is a pale yellow, which can be seen on the margins. The ventral side is a pale yellow as well.

Aside from its coloration and shape, it is distinguished from other members of Cratera by having dorsal eyes restricted to lateral bands, a conspicuous glandular margin with four types of secretory cells, a bell-shaped pharynx, a short esophagus, the anteriormost testes being posterior to the ovaries, sperm ducts that open laterally into the proximal portion of the prostatic vesicle, an extrabulbar, unpaired prostatic vesicle with a tubular distal portion and an ample proximal portion, ovovitelline ducts that emerge dorsolaterally from the back half of the ovaries and ascend laterally to the female atrium, a short common ovovitelline duct, a long, dorso-anteriorly curved vagina, equal atria lengths, and a lack of folds separating the male and female atria.

== Etymology ==
The specific epithet, steffeni, was given in honor of naturalist MSc. Clemente José Steffen S.J., for his "relevant contribution to the ethnobotany in southern Brazil".
