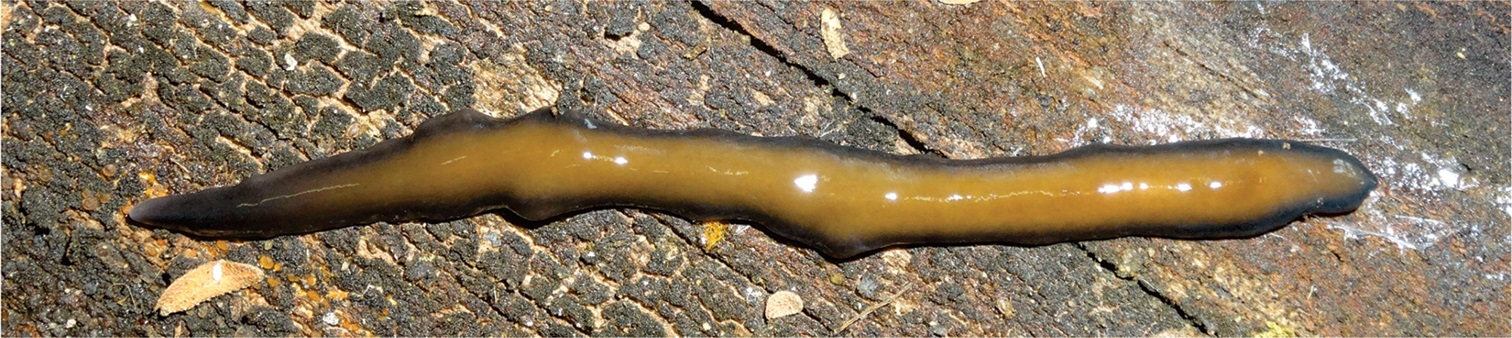

Scientific classification
- Kingdom: Animalia
- Phylum: Platyhelminthes
- Order: Tricladida
- Family: Geoplanidae
- Genus: Cratera
- Species: C. nigrimarginata

Binomial name
- Cratera nigrimarginata Rossi & Leal-Zanchet, 2017

= Cratera nigrimarginata =

Species of flatworm

Cratera nigrimarginata is a species of land planarian found in Brazil.

== Description ==
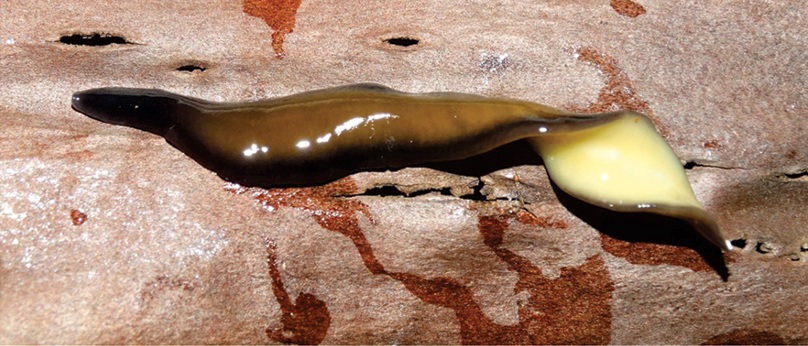
Specimen of C. nigrimarginata showing both dorsal and ventral sides.

Cratera nigrimarginata is a medium-sized land planarian with an elongate and flat body, with parallel margins, reaching about 60 millimetres (2.4 in) in length. The dorsum has a light-brownish color forming a broad band and is bordered by greyish or black margins. The venter is pale yellow.

The several eyes of C. nigrimarginata are distributed marginally in the first millimeters of the body and posteriorly become dorsal, occupying almost the whole dorsal surface on the anterior third of the body, becoming less numerous towards the anterior tip.

Aside from coloration, C. nigrimarginata can be distinguished from other members of Cratera by the clear halos and bilobed appearance of its eyes, a cylindrical pharynx, a prostatic vesicle with an unbranched and dilated proximal portion, the presence of infolds on the tip of the penis papilla that project into the ejaculatory duct, and cyanophil glands that evenly pierce the male atrium.

== Etymology ==
The specific epithet nigrimarginata comes from Latin niger, black + marginata, bordered, thus meaning "black-bordered" and refers to the black margins of the body.

== Distribution ==
Cratera nigrimarginata is known only a private reserve, the Araucaria Natural Heritage Private Reserve, in the municipality of General Carneiro, Paraná, Brazil.
