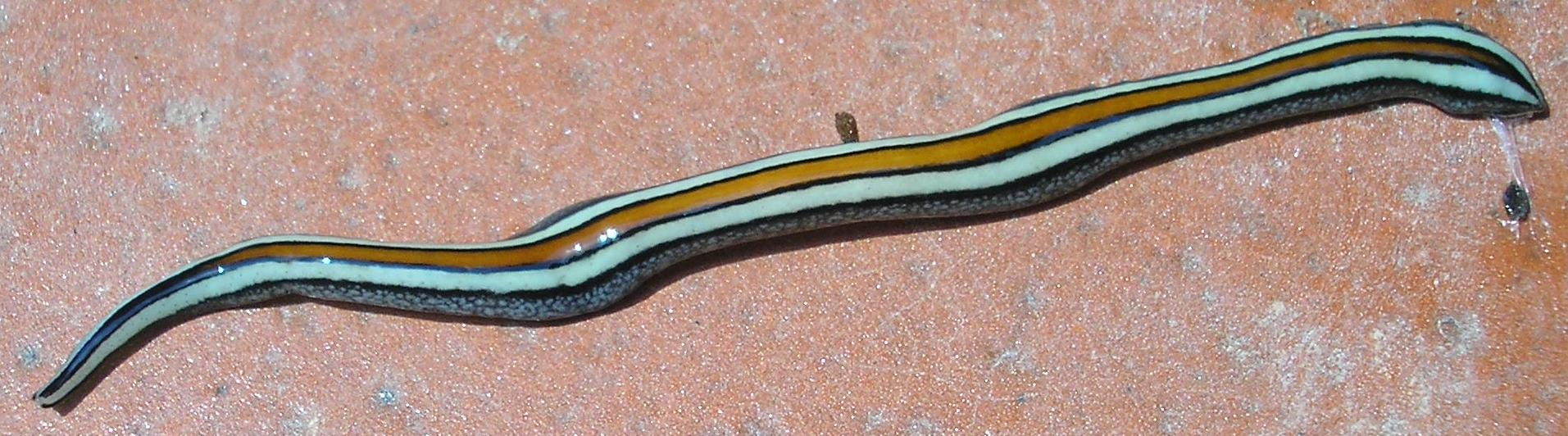
- Geoplana cambara

Scientific classification
- Kingdom: Animalia
- Phylum: Platyhelminthes
- Order: Tricladida
- Family: Geoplanidae
- Genus: Geoplana
- Species: G. cambara

Binomial name
- Geoplana cambara Almeida, Marques & Carbayo, 2019

= Geoplana cambara =

Species of flatworm

Geoplana cambara is a species of land planarian belonging to the subfamily Geoplaninae. It is found in areas of the Atlantic Forest within Saint-Hilaire/Lange National Park in Brazil.

== Description ==
Geoplana cambara is a flatworm around 43 mm in length and 3.5 mm in width. The body is elongate and has parallel margins; the front tip is rounded and the back tip is pointed. The dorsal side has an orange band running down the middle, which is flanked on each side by a thin black stripe. A broader white stripe borders this, which is in turn bordered by a black line. This line is flanked by a gray band mottled with white, which is bordered by a marginal black line. The ventral side is a cream color with black margins.

Along with its coloration, it can be distinguished from other members of Geoplana by a loose muscular tube of parenchymal fibres around the intestine, and a muscular cylinder surrounding the ejaculatory duct with a diameter 12 times that of the duct.

== Etymology ==
The specific epithet, cambara, is derived from the name of a river flowing near the type locality.
