= Cratera arucuia =

Scientific classification
- Kingdom: Animalia
- Phylum: Platyhelminthes
- Order: Tricladida
- Family: Geoplanidae
- Genus: Cratera
- Species: C. arucuia

Binomial name
- Cratera arucuia Lago-Barcia & Carbayo, 2018

Species of flatworm

Cratera arucuia is a species of land planarian belonging to the subfamily Geoplaninae. It is known from specimens found in Intervales State Park in Brazil.

== Description ==
Cratera arucuia is a flatworm around 43 mm in length and 3 mm in width. The body is thin, with parallel margins, a rounded front tip, and a pointed back tip. The dorsal side of the body is a whitish cream base color, with an irregular median stripe made of small orange spots. An interval of the cream base may separate the stripe from dark gray or black lateral stripes that are mottled with eye halos. A mottled, marginal stripe of gray is outside of the lateral stripes, separated by a whitish cream interval. The ventral side of the body is a whitish color.

Aside from its coloration, it is distinguished from other members of Cratera by having dorsal eyes that initiate in the head region, an ovoid and extrabulbar proximal section of the prostatic vesicle that is positioned dorsally above the penis bulb, a strongly developed penis bulb that extends 1.8 mm anterior to the penis, an ejaculatory duct that is not distally dilated, the presence of thick circular muscle surrounding the ejaculatory duct that is four times its diameter in the proximal region and twice in the distal, a penis papilla projecting into the female atrium, a male atrium that is 1.4 the length of the female, and the presence of a common glandular duct.

== Etymology ==
The specific epithet, arucuia, is derived from the Tupi language words aru, "back, opposite side", and cuia, "gourd", in reference to the dorsal location of the ovoid or gourd-like prostatic vesicle.
