= Cratera hina =

Scientific classification
- Kingdom: Animalia
- Phylum: Platyhelminthes
- Order: Tricladida
- Family: Geoplanidae
- Genus: Cratera
- Species: C. hina

Binomial name
- Cratera hina (Marcus, 1951)

Synonyms
- Geoplana hina Marcus, 1951

Species of flatworm

Cratera hina is a species of land planarian belonging to the subfamily Geoplaninae. It is known from specimens found in the Paranapiacaba Conservation Units Mosaic in Brazil.

== Description ==
Cratera hina is a flatworm that can reach up to 60 mm in length. The dorsal side of the body consists of a lateral black band on each side of the body and a median orange band. The frontal margin is black.

Aside from its size and coloration, it is distinguished from other members of Cratera by having a ciliated epidermis both dorsally and ventrally, dorsal eyes that initiate in the head region, a short penis bulb that extends very little anteriorly to the penis papilla, a bifurcated and extrabulbar proximal portion of the prostatic vesicle that is attached from the penis bulb, an ejaculatory duct that isn't distally dilated, a thick muscle tube surrounding the ejaculatory duct with a diameter triple that of the duct, an underlying muscularis of the penis papilla made up of two circular layers with a longitudinal layer in between, the dorsal insertion of the penis papilla being slightly anterior to the ventral one, a penis papilla that projects into the female atrium, the dorsal surface of the male atrium being pierced by several glands, and the lack of a common glandular duct.
