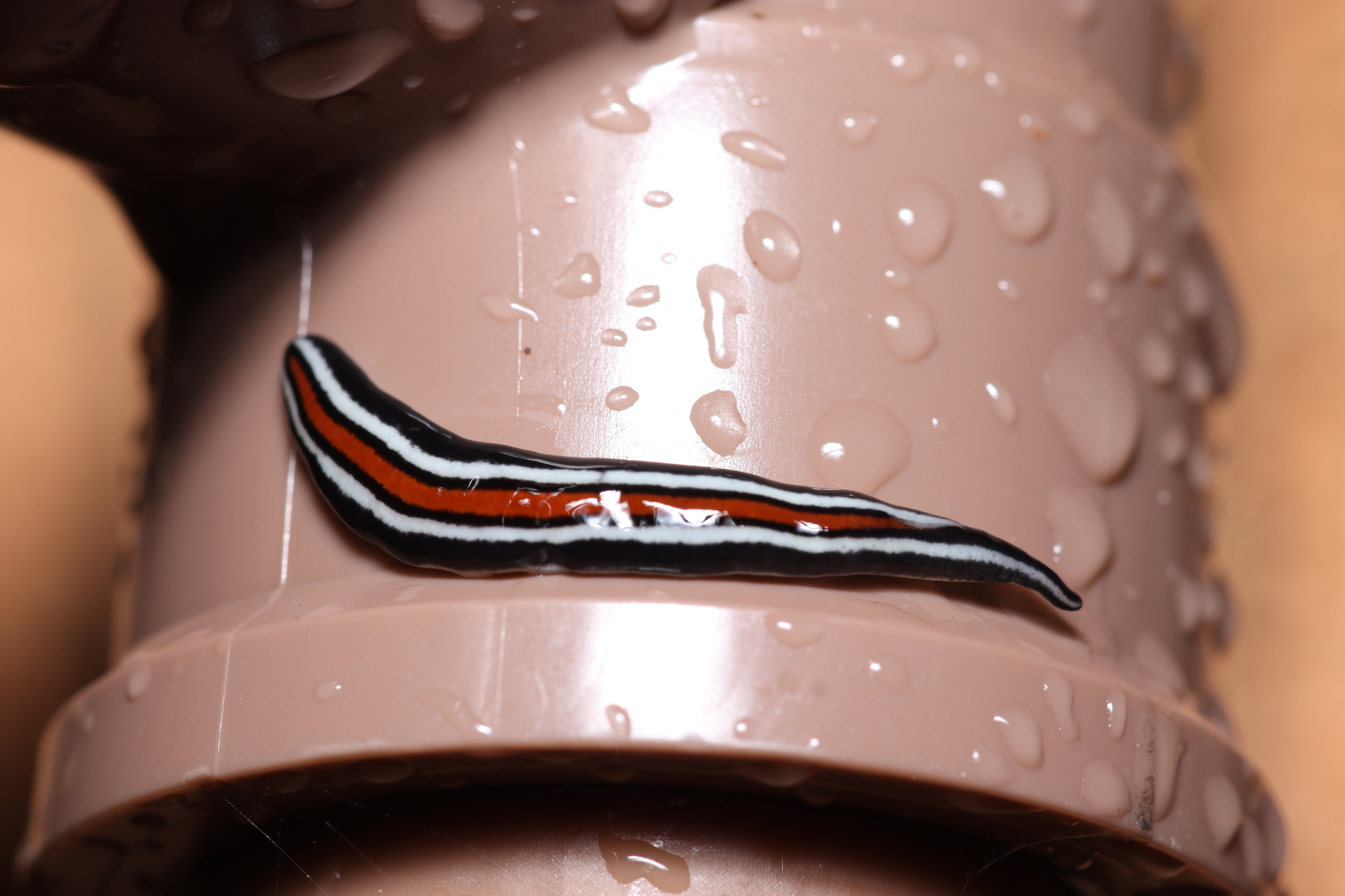

Scientific classification
- Kingdom: Animalia
- Phylum: Platyhelminthes
- Order: Tricladida
- Family: Geoplanidae
- Genus: Geoplana
- Species: G. piratininga

Binomial name
- Geoplana piratininga Almeida, Marques & Carbayo, 2019

= Geoplana piratininga =

Species of flatworm

Geoplana piratininga is a species of land planarian belonging to the subfamily Geoplaninae. It is found in areas within the Atlantic Forest in the municipalities of São Paulo and Mongaguá, Brazil.

== Description ==
Geoplana piratininga is a flatworm around 25 mm in length and 4 mm in width. The body is relatively short and has parallel margins; the front tip is rounded and the back tip is pointed. The dorsal side has a traffic-red band running down the middle, bounded on each side by a black stripe; the stripe is bordered by a white stripe, which is in turn bordered by a black band, which is then bordered by a thin marginal white line. The ventral side is a whitish color.

Aside from its coloration, it is distinguished from other members of Geoplana by having the dorsal and ventral insertions of the penis papilla at the same transverse plane, non-folded walls of the female atrium, and a female-to-male atrium length ratio of 2.

== Etymology ==
The specific epithet, piratininga, is derived from the historical Tupi language name of the type locality of São Paulo, Piratininga plains.
