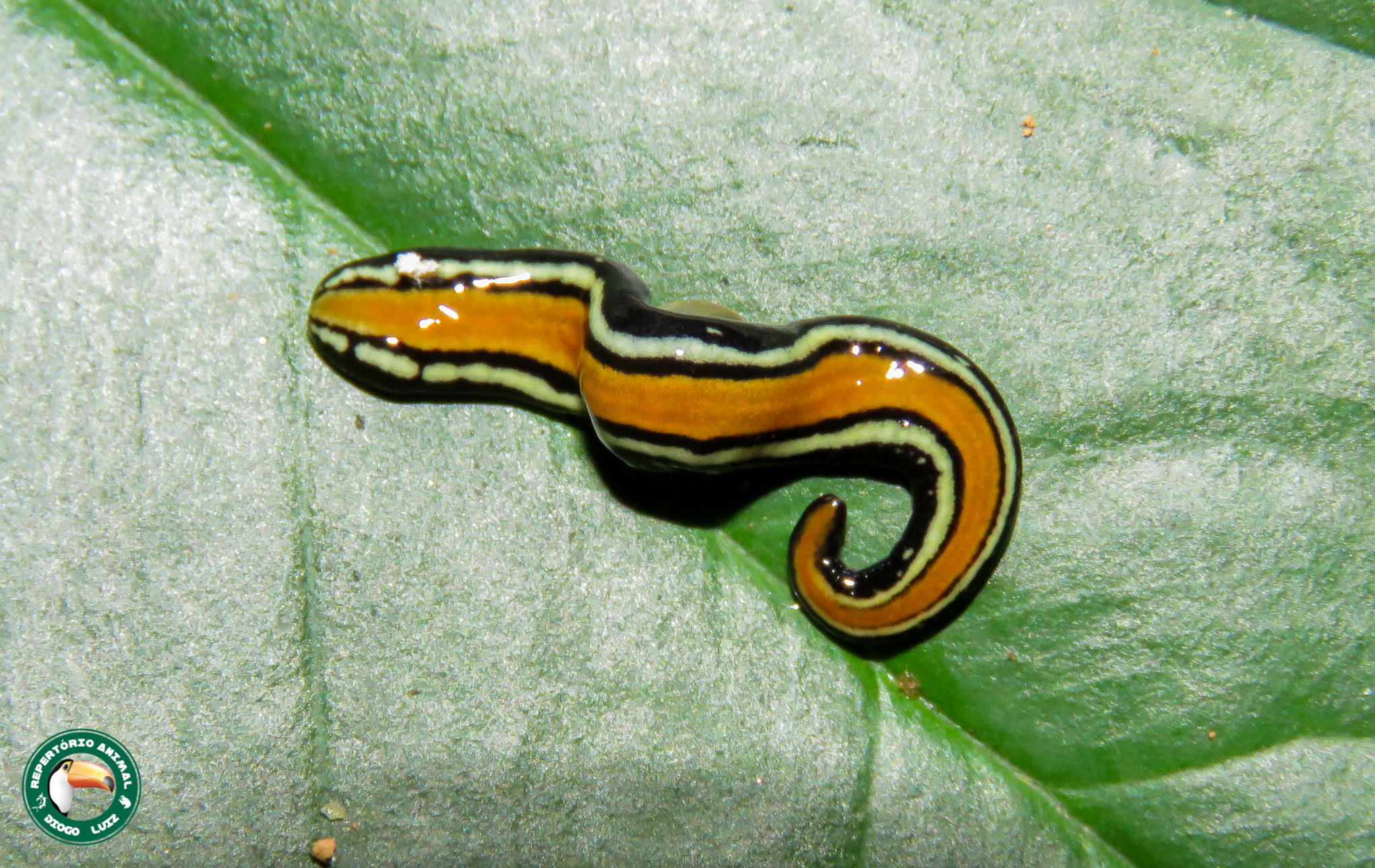

Scientific classification
- Kingdom: Animalia
- Phylum: Platyhelminthes
- Order: Tricladida
- Family: Geoplanidae
- Genus: Geoplana
- Species: G. apua

Binomial name
- Geoplana apua Almeida, Marques & Carbayo, 2019

= Geoplana apua =

Species of flatworm

Geoplana apua is a species of land planarian belonging to the subfamily Geoplaninae. It is found in areas within the Atlantic Forest in the municipalities of Nova Iguaçu and Teresópolis, Brazil.

== Description ==
Geoplana apua is a flatworm around 45 mm in length. The body has parallel margins; the front tip is rounded and the back tip is pointed. The dorsal side has a luminous orange band running down the middle, flanked on each side by a black stripe; the black stripe is bordered on the outside by a greenish-yellow stripe, which is bordered by a black band. The ventral side is a pale orange color.

Aside from its coloration, it is distinguished from other members of Geoplana by having two-layered musculature of the inner pharynx, a developed anteroventral region of the penis bulb, and a penis papilla with the dorsal insertion displaced anteriorly and very ventrally, as long as 18 times its diameter.

== Etymology ==
The specific epithet, apua, is derived from a Tupi language word meaning "mound", in reference to the hills where type specimens were collected.
