= Gigantea maupoi =

Scientific classification
- Kingdom: Animalia
- Phylum: Platyhelminthes
- Order: Tricladida
- Family: Geoplanidae
- Genus: Gigantea
- Species: G. maupoi

Binomial name
- Gigantea maupoi Carbayo, 2008

Species of flatworm

Gigantea maupoi is a species of land planarian belonging to the subfamily Geoplaninae. It is known from specimens collected near Medellín, Colombia.

== Description ==
Gigantea maupoi is a flatworm around 60–70 mm in length and 6 mm in width. The body is flat and lanceolated. The head is curled when crawling, the front end is rounded, and the back end is pointed. The dorsal side of the body is an olive green color, with light green borders that are black in the anterior region. In the anterior end, the mid-dorsal region is black; in the posterior, it is initially dark green before lightening at the region of the copulatory apparatus.

It can additionally be distinguished from other members of Gigantea via a sub-neural mesenchymal muscle layer that is only present in the head region, the presence of an esophagus, the inner musculature of the pharynx and esophagus being composed of a one-fiber-thick subepithelial layer and a circular layer interspersed with fibers, a long genital apparatus, equal atria lengths, and an oblique emergence of the penis papilla from the male atrium's dorsal wall. Additionally, the structure of the male accessory genital organs of G. maupoi distinguishes it from the rest of Geoplaninae, with each usually presenting with several canalicula.

== Etymology ==
The specific epithet, maupoi is derived from the name of the type specimen collector, Mauricio Andrés Muñoz Restrepo.
