= Gigantea urubambensis =

Scientific classification
- Kingdom: Animalia
- Phylum: Platyhelminthes
- Order: Tricladida
- Family: Geoplanidae
- Genus: Gigantea
- Species: G. urubambensis

Binomial name
- Gigantea urubambensis Negrete, Brusa & Carbayo, 2010

Species of flatworm

Gigantea urubambensis is a species of land planarian belonging to the subfamily Geoplaninae. It is known from specimens collected in rainforests of the Lower Urubamba River valley in Peru.

== Description ==
Gigantea urubambensis is a flatworm around 160 mm in length and 13 mm in width. The body is elongated and lanceolated, with a blunt posterior end. The dorsal side of the body has a yellow-orange band running down the middle, with two paramedian reddish stripes, two lateral black bands, and two marginal whitish stripes. The ventral side of the body is a light whitish gray color.

It can additionally be distinguished from other members of Gigantea via eyes that are initially marginal and uniserial encircling the front tip, becoming dorsal and pluriserial approaching the posterior with clear halos along the pigmented bands, a ciliated dorsal epithelium in the head region, a collar-type pharynx, very dorsal testes, a large, ventrally projected penis papilla extending from the roof of the male atrium, ovovitelline ducts posteriorly ascending to the female atrium, a wide female atrium, and the lack of a glandular margin, esophagus, prostatic vesicle, common glandular ovovitelline duct, and glandular ridges on the penis papilla.

== Etymology ==
The specific epithet, urubambensis is derived from the Urubamba River; the Lower Urubamba River Valley is the type locality of the species.
