= Gigantea gouvernoni =

Scientific classification
- Kingdom: Animalia
- Phylum: Platyhelminthes
- Order: Tricladida
- Family: Geoplanidae
- Genus: Gigantea
- Species: G. gouvernoni

Binomial name
- Gigantea gouvernoni Jones & Sterrer, 2005

Species of flatworm

Gigantea gouvernoni is a species of land planarian belonging to the subfamily Geoplaninae. It is known from specimens collected from the grounds of Government House, Bermuda.

== Description ==
Gigantea gouvernoni is a flatworm around 25 mm in length and 4 mm in width. The front tip of the body is rounded and the back tip is pointed. The dorsal side is a dark brown base color with a lighter brown line running down the middle; this line broadens over the pharynx. Irregular black markings are on the dorsal side. Larger black spots arranged in irregular rows to the level of the pharynx mark the locations of the dorsal testes. The ventral side is a light gray color.

It can additionally be distinguished from other members of Gigantea via its lack of glandular ridges, lack of dilation of the female antrum, and blunt, short, vertical penis.

== Etymology ==
The specific epithet was given in honor of Oliver Gouvernon, who found the type specimens of G. gouvernoni.
