= Geoplana cananeia =

Scientific classification
- Kingdom: Animalia
- Phylum: Platyhelminthes
- Order: Tricladida
- Family: Geoplanidae
- Genus: Geoplana
- Species: G. cananeia

Binomial name
- Geoplana cananeia Almeida, Marques & Carbayo, 2019

Species of flatworm

Geoplana cananeia is a species of land planarian belonging to the subfamily Geoplaninae. It is found in areas of the Atlantic Forest on Ilha do Cardoso within Cananéia, Brazil.

== Description ==
Geoplana cananeia is a flatworm around 66 mm in length and 5 mm in width. The body has parallel margins; the front tip is rounded and the back tip is pointed. The dorsal side has a yellow-orange band running down the middle, which is flanked on each side by a black stripe, which merges at the back end. A white stripe borders this, which is in turn bordered by a black stripe that merges into a gray band mottled with white, which fades towards the outer margin. The margin is bordered by a thin black stripe. The ventral side is a whitish color with black margins.

Along with its coloration, it can be distinguished from other members of Geoplana by a 1 mm anterior extension of the penis bulb from the penis papilla, stroma of the penis papilla that have necks of glands gathered in bundles that resemble an orange in cross-section, and a richly folded posterior-half wall of the female atrium.

== Etymology ==
The specific epithet is derived from the municipality of Cananéia, where the species' type locality is located.
