= Cratera picuia =

Scientific classification
- Kingdom: Animalia
- Phylum: Platyhelminthes
- Order: Tricladida
- Family: Geoplanidae
- Genus: Cratera
- Species: C. picuia

Binomial name
- Cratera picuia Lago-Barcia & Carbayo, 2018

Species of flatworm

Cratera picuia is a species of land planarian belonging to the subfamily Geoplaninae. It is known from specimens found in Saint-Hilaire/Lange National Park in Brazil.

== Description ==
Cratera picuia is a flatworm around 30 mm in length and 3 mm in width. The body is elongated, with parallel margins and a pointed back tip. The dorsal side of the body has two pearl-orange paramedian bands separated by an ivory midline band and two oyster-white marginal bands. Each marginal band is divided in half by black-gray spots that become denser towards the back of the body, forming irregular longitudinal stripes. The ventral side of the body is a white color.

Aside from its coloration, it is distinguished from other members of Cratera by having a canalicular prostatic vesicle located inside the penis bulb, and an ejaculatory duct that is not distally dilated.

== Etymology ==
The specific epithet, picuia, is derived from the Tupi language words py, "inside", and cuia, "gourd", in reference to the species' prostatic vesicle being located inside the penis bulb.
