= Cratera anamariae =

Scientific classification
- Kingdom: Animalia
- Phylum: Platyhelminthes
- Order: Tricladida
- Family: Geoplanidae
- Genus: Cratera
- Species: C. anamariae

Binomial name
- Cratera anamariae Carbayo & Almeida, 2015

Species of flatworm

Cratera anamariae is a species of land planarian belonging to the subfamily Geoplaninae. It is known from specimens found in Serra dos Órgãos National Park, Brazil.

== Description ==
Cratera anamariae is a flatworm around 4 cm in length and 1 cm in width. The body is lanceolate; both ends of the body are pointed. The dorsal side of the body is a luminous or sulfur yellow color, with two black paramedian stripes running across it. The stripes thin at the ends of the body and join at the front. The area between the stripes has been observed to be a light pink or cream color. The front margins are black. Two submarginal black-brown stripes have been observed in some specimens. The ventral side is a cream color, becoming darker along the margins of the front end.

It is distinguished from other members of Cratera by its coloration and stripes, a cylindrical pharynx with the dorsal and ventral insertion in the same transverse plane, and a female atrium that narrows in the front.

== Etymology ==
The specific epithet, anamariae, was given in honor of Ana Maria Leal-Zanchet of Unisinos, for her "contribution to the knowledge of the triclads".
