= Geoplana pulchella =

Scientific classification
- Kingdom: Animalia
- Phylum: Platyhelminthes
- Order: Tricladida
- Family: Geoplanidae
- Genus: Geoplana
- Species: G. pulchella

Binomial name
- Geoplana pulchella Müller, 1856

Species of flatworm

Geoplana pulchella is a species of land planarian belonging to the subfamily Geoplaninae. It is found in areas of the Atlantic Forest within the state of Santa Catarina, such as in Blumenau, Paulo Lopes, and Alfredo Wagner, in Brazil.

== Description ==
Geoplana pulchella is a flatworm around 30 mm in length and 3 mm in width. The body is elongate and has parallel margins; the front tip is rounded and the back tip is pointed. The front third of the dorsal side of the body is a pure orange color, while the rest of the dorsal side has a light grey band running down the middle, flanked on each side by a black band. The entire dorsal side is speckled with white. The front third of the ventral side is a traffic white color, while the rest is squirrel grey.

Along with its coloration, it can be distinguished from other members of Geoplana by a 1 mm anterior extension of the penis bulb from the penis papilla, papilla with a length 7–9 times its diameter with a thin tip, and a conspicuous circular muscle fibre mass around the posterior female atrium.
