= Cratera paraitinga =

Scientific classification
- Kingdom: Animalia
- Phylum: Platyhelminthes
- Order: Tricladida
- Family: Geoplanidae
- Genus: Cratera
- Species: C. paraitinga

Binomial name
- Cratera paraitinga Araujo, Carbayo, Riutort & Álvarez-Presas, 2020

Species of flatworm

Cratera paraitinga is a species of land planarian belonging to the subfamily Geoplaninae. It is known from specimens found in the Boracéia Biological Station in Brazil.

== Description ==
Cratera paraitinga is a flatworm that can reach up to 76 mm in length and 7 mm in width. The body is slightly lanceolate, with a rounded front tip. The body is widest at the pharynx, narrowing gradually towards the front and abruptly towards the back tip. The dorsal side of the body has a melon yellow median stripe that's bordered on either side by a jet black stripe; the stripes have a white band on the outside. The body margins are jet black. The front margins of the body fade into a carmine red color. The ventral side is a grey white color that fades into orange brown at the front of the body.

Aside from its coloration and length, it is distinguished from other members of Cratera by having marginal eyes, a cylindrical to bell-shaped pharynx, a pharyngeal pouch 2 mm anterior to the prostatic vesicle, relatively large distal dilation of the ejaculatory duct, a penis papilla as long as the male atrium, a female atrium that is 2.4 times longer than the male, and the presence of a long common glandular ovovitelline duct.

== Etymology ==
The specific epithet is derived from the former name of Salesópolis, São José do Paraitinga, the type locality of the species.
