= Cratera joia =

Scientific classification
- Kingdom: Animalia
- Phylum: Platyhelminthes
- Order: Tricladida
- Family: Geoplanidae
- Genus: Cratera
- Species: C. joia

Binomial name
- Cratera joia (Froehlich, 1956) Carbayo et al., 2013

Synonyms
- Geoplana (Geoplana) joia Froehlich, 1956

Species of flatworm

Cratera joia is a species of land planarian belonging to the subfamily Geoplaninae. It is known from specimens found in Serra do Mar State Park in Brazil.

== Description ==
Cratera joia is a flatworm that can reach up to 40 mm in length, and 5 mm in width. It has parallel body margins; both ends of the body are pointed. The dorsal side of the body is dark, aside from the front tip, which is rust-colored on both sides. Additionally, a rust-colored midline and two marginal lines run down the dorsum.

Aside from its size and coloration, it is distinguished from other members of Cratera by having an epidermis that is ciliated both dorsally and ventrally, eyes over the entire dorsal side, pear-shaped sensory pits, an unsharpened glandular margin, a bifurcated and extrabulbar proximal portion of the prostatic vesicle that is attached to the penis bulb, a penis bulb extending 0.6 mm anteriorly to the penis papilla, an ejaculatory duct that can be slightly dilated distally, the dorsal insertion of the penis papilla being slightly anterior to the ventral, a penis papilla that projects into the female atrium, the distal dorsal section of the penis papilla being lined with a higher, sinuous epithelium that is pierced by several cyanophil glands, and the presence of a common glandular duct.
