= Geoplana ibiuna =

Scientific classification
- Kingdom: Animalia
- Phylum: Platyhelminthes
- Order: Tricladida
- Family: Geoplanidae
- Genus: Geoplana
- Species: G. ibiuna

Binomial name
- Geoplana ibiuna Almeida, Marques & Carbayo, 2019

Species of flatworm

Geoplana ibiuna is a species of land planarian belonging to the subfamily Geoplaninae. It is found in areas of the Atlantic Forest within Ibiúna and Santana de Parnaíba, Brazil.

== Description ==
Geoplana ibiuna is a flatworm around 40–50 mm in length and 3 mm in width. The body has parallel margins; the front tip is rounded and the back tip is pointed. The dorsal side has an orange-ochre band running down the middle, bounded on each side by a black stripe, which joins at the back end; this is then bordered by a white stripe, which is in turn bordered by a black band, which is bordered by a white marginal line. The ventral side is a whitish color.

Along with its coloration, it can be distinguished from other members of Geoplana by the strong anterior displacement of the penis papilla's dorsal insertion and the richly folded posterior wall of the female atrium.

== Etymology ==
The specific epithet is derived from one of the type localities, Ibiúna.
