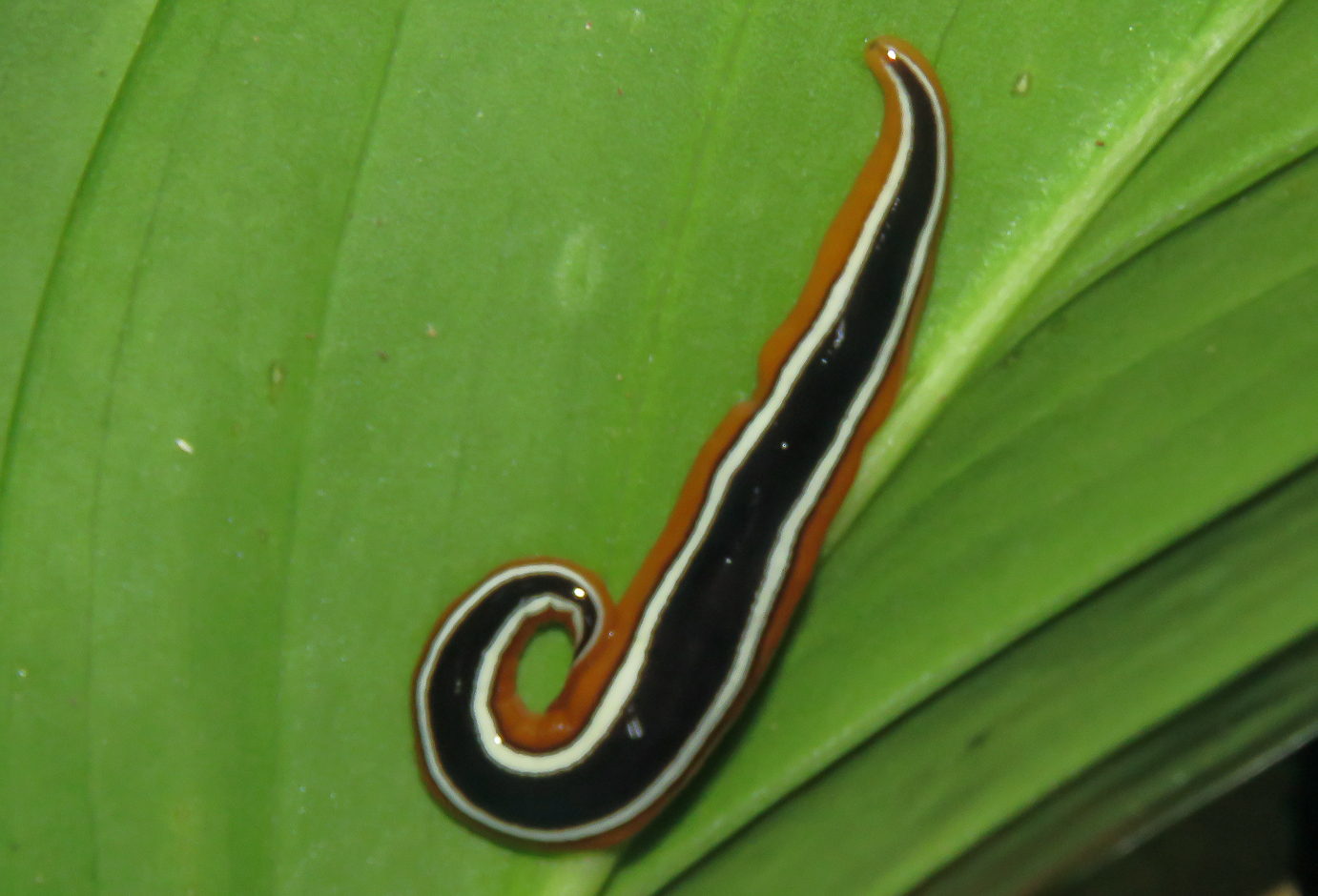

Scientific classification
- Kingdom: Animalia
- Phylum: Platyhelminthes
- Order: Tricladida
- Family: Geoplanidae
- Genus: Geoplana
- Species: G. vaginuloides

Binomial name
- Geoplana vaginuloides (Darwin, 1844)

Synonyms
- Planaria vaginuloides Darwin, 1844

= Geoplana vaginuloides =

Species of flatworm

Geoplana vaginuloides is a species of land planarian belonging to the subfamily Geoplaninae. It is found in areas within the Atlantic Forest in the municipalities of Rio de Janeiro and Teresópolis, Brazil.

== Description ==
Geoplana vaginuloides is a flatworm around 70 mm in length and 4 mm in width. The body is elongate with parallel margins; the front tip is rounded and the back tip is pointed. The dorsal side has a black band running down the middle of the body, flanked on either side by a white-yellow stripe; outside of the yellow stripe is a thin black line, bordered by a reddish-iron colored band. The underlying base color is a saffron yellow. The ventral side is a grey color; at the head, the margins darken.

Aside from its coloration, it is distinguished from other members of Geoplana by the penis papilla having the dorsal insertion displaced anteriorly and ventrally, at the same level as the ventral insertion, so that the root of the penis papilla points to the dorsum.
