= Geoplana caraguatatuba =

Scientific classification
- Kingdom: Animalia
- Phylum: Platyhelminthes
- Order: Tricladida
- Family: Geoplanidae
- Genus: Geoplana
- Species: G. caraguatatuba

Binomial name
- Geoplana caraguatatuba Almeida, Marques & Carbayo, 2019

Species of flatworm

Geoplana caraguatatuba is a species of land planarian belonging to the subfamily Geoplaninae. It is known from specimens found in Atlantic Forest within Caraguatatuba, Brazil.

== Description ==
Geoplana caraguatatuba is a flatworm around 60 mm in length and 4 mm in width. The body has parallel margins; the front tip is rounded and the back tip is pointed. The dorsal side has an orange-ochre band running down the middle, bounded on each side by a black line, which joins at the back end; the line is bordered by a white stripe, which is in turn bordered by a black stripe that merges into a grey band with white mottling. A black line borders the margin. The ventral side is a whitish color with black margins.

Along with its coloration, it can be distinguished from other members of Geoplana by the penis bulb extending anteriorly 0.8 mm from the penis papilla and the walls of the female atrium not being folded.

== Etymology ==
The specific epithet is derived from the type locality of Caraguatatuba.
