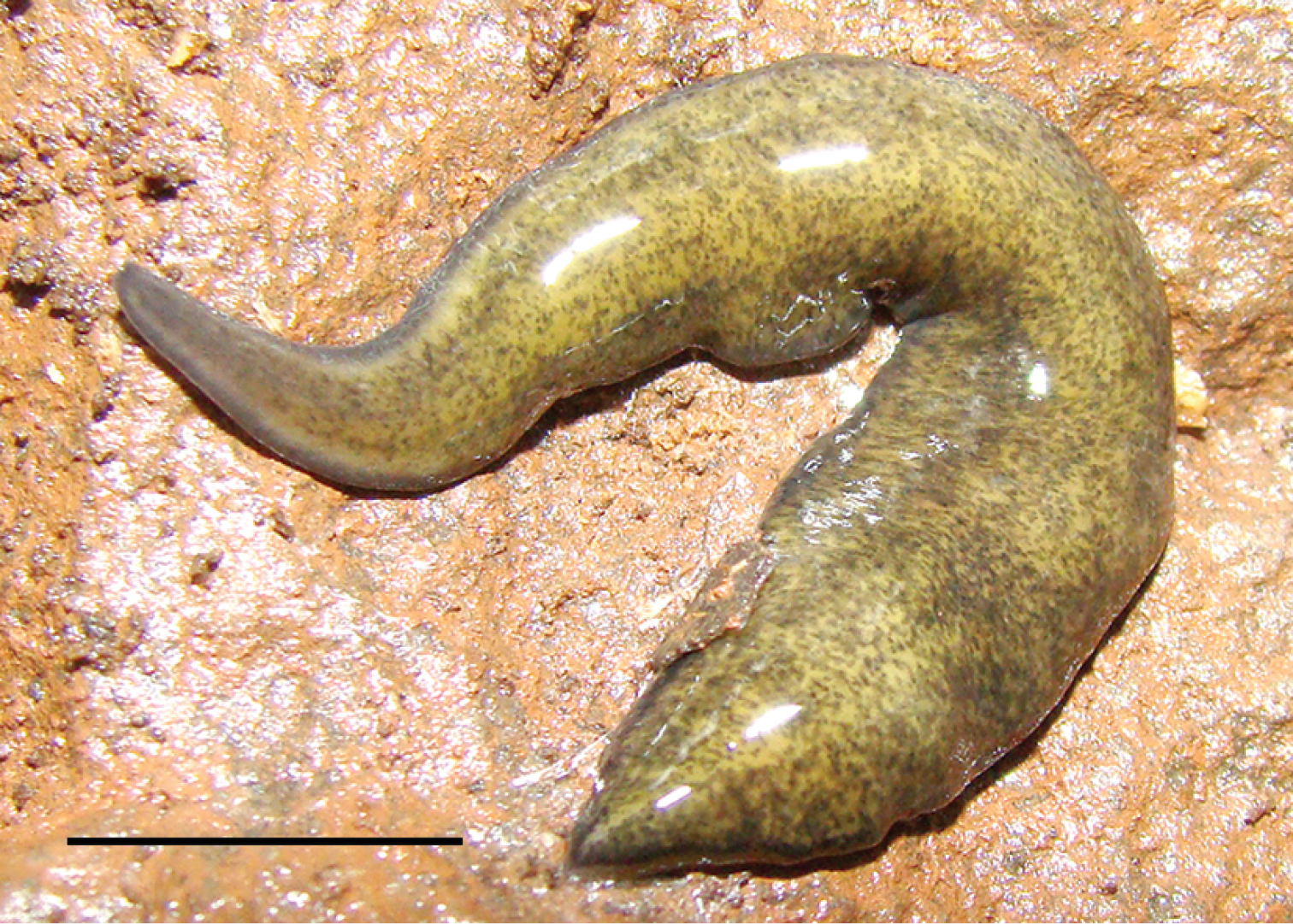

Scientific classification
- Kingdom: Animalia
- Phylum: Platyhelminthes
- Order: Tricladida
- Family: Geoplanidae
- Genus: Cratera
- Species: C. viridimaculata

Binomial name
- Cratera viridimaculata Negrete & Brusa, 2016

= Cratera viridimaculata =

Species of flatworm

Cratera viridimaculata is a species of land planarian found in Argentina.

== Description ==
Cratera viridimaculata is a medium-sized land planarian with a lanceolate body, reaching about 50 millimetres (2.0 in) in length. The color of the dorsum is light olive green covered with dark gray fine spots. The ventral side is whitish and the margins on both dorsal and ventral sides are gray.

The several eyes of C. viridimaculata are distributed marginally in the first millimeters of the body and posteriorly become dorsal, occupying around 30% of the body width just before the region of the pharynx.

Aside from its coloration and dorsal eyes, C. viridimaculata is distinguished from other members of Cratera by the presence of a glandular margin, a cylindrical pharynx, and an extrabulbar, tubular, C-shaped prostatic vesicle with a proximal bifurcated portion.

== Etymology ==
The specific epithet viridimaculata comes from Latin viridis, green + maculata, spotted, and refers to the dorsal pigmentation of the body.

== Distribution ==
Cratera viridimaculata is found in the Interior Atlantic Forest, Misiones province, Argentina, an area covered by subtropical forests. It occurs in two natural reserves, Esmeralda Provincial Park and the San Antonio Strict Nature Reserve.
