= Cratera cuarassu =

Scientific classification
- Kingdom: Animalia
- Phylum: Platyhelminthes
- Order: Tricladida
- Family: Geoplanidae
- Genus: Cratera
- Species: C. cuarassu

Binomial name
- Cratera cuarassu Carbayo & Almeida, 2015

Species of flatworm

Cratera cuarassu is a species of land planarian belonging to the subfamily Geoplaninae. It is known from specimens found in Desengano State Park, Brazil.

== Description ==
Cratera cuarassu is a flatworm around 11 cm in length and 0.6 cm in width. It has parallel body margins. The front end of the body is rounded, while the back end is pointed. The dorsal side of the body is a black-blue color, with a submarginal zinc-yellow stripe on each side of the body, running almost from end to end. The ventral side is a light ivory color, becoming a brown-beige at the front end.

It is distinguished from other members of Cratera by its coloration along with the peculiar shape of the male organs; specifically, a short, wide penis papilla that projects vertically downwards from the male atrium roof, and the possession of a large intra-penial cavity.

== Etymology ==
The specific epithet, cuarassu, is derived from the Tupi language words cuara, "hole, cave", and assu, "large"; this is in reference to the species' large intra-penial cavity.
