= Cratera imbiri =

Scientific classification
- Kingdom: Animalia
- Phylum: Platyhelminthes
- Order: Tricladida
- Family: Geoplanidae
- Genus: Cratera
- Species: C. imbiri

Binomial name
- Cratera imbiri Araujo, Carbayo, Riutort & Álvarez-Presas, 2020

Species of flatworm

Cratera imbiri is a species of land planarian belonging to the subfamily Geoplaninae. It is known from specimens found in Campos do Jordão State Park in Brazil.

== Description ==
Cratera imbiri is a flatworm around 26–38 mm in length and 2.5 mm in width. The body has parallel margins and rounded tips. The dorsal side of the body has a sulfur yellow median stripe that's bordered on either side by a khaki grey band. The body margins are a cream color. The front of the body fades into a coral red color on both the dorsal and ventral side. The rest of the ventral side of the body is cream.

Aside from its coloration and length, it is distinguished from other members of Cratera by having marginal eyes, a cylindrical pharynx with the dorsal insertion posteriorly shifted at about a fifth of the pharynx's length, a pharyngeal pouch that is very close to the prostatic vesicle, the epithelium of the penis papilla being underlain by a circular muscle fiber layer, a female atrium that is 3.2 times longer than the male and gradually narrows at its posterior, and the presence of a long common glandular ovovitelline duct.

== Etymology ==
The specific epithet is derived from the former name of Campos do Jordão State Park, Vila de São Matheus do Imbiri, the type locality of the species.
