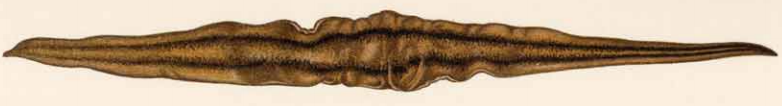
- Gigantea gigantea

Scientific classification
- Kingdom: Animalia
- Phylum: Platyhelminthes
- Order: Tricladida
- Family: Geoplanidae
- Subfamily: Geoplaninae
- Genus: Gigantea; Ogren & Kawakatsu, 1990

Type species
- Geoplana gigantea von Graff, 1899

= Gigantea (flatworm) =

Genus of flatworms

Gigantea is a genus of land planarians from the Neotropical realm.

== Description ==
Species of Gigantea have a large, broad and flat body. The copulatory apparatus has a permanent penis and the ovovitelline ducts enter the female atrium from below. This definition, however, is incomplete regarding the anatomical features currently considered in the definition of planarian genera and Gigantea is certainly a heterogeneous genus.

== Etymology ==
The name Gigantea (Latin for "giant") comes from the specific epithet, gigantea, of the type-species, originally described as Geoplana gigantea due to its large size.

== Species ==
Currently, there are 14 species assigned to the genus Gigantea:

- Gigantea bistriata (Hyman, 1962)
- Gigantea cameliae (Furhmann, 1912)
- Gigantea chiriquii (Hyman, 1962)
- Gigantea gigantea (von Graff, 1899)
- Gigantea gouvernoni Jones & Sterrer, 2005
- Gigantea idaia (Du Bois-Reymond Marcus, 1951)
- Gigantea maupoi Carbayo, 2008
- Gigantea montana (Hyman, 1939)
- Gigantea picadoi (de Beauchamp, 1912)
- Gigantea ronaldsluysi Carbayo, 2023
- Gigantea sandersoni (Prudhoe, 1949)
- Gigantea unicolor (Hyman, 1955)
- Gigantea urubambensis Negrete, Brusa & Carbayo, 2010
- Gigantea vongunteni (Fuhrmann, 1914)
