= Albert Löfgren State Park =

State park in São Paulo, Brazil

- Parque Estadual Alberto Löfgren
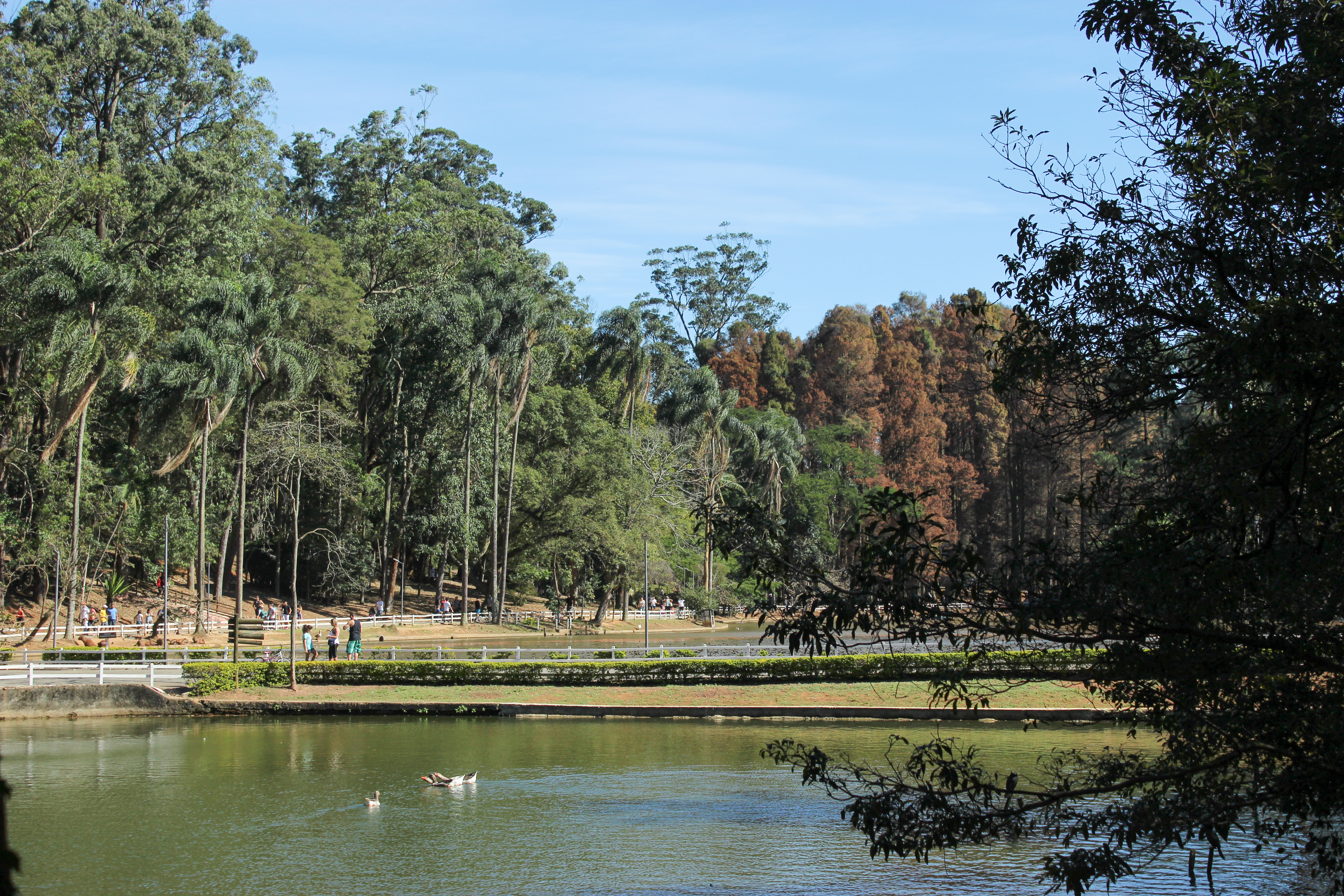
- Central Lake in the park

- Location within Brazil
- Nearest city: São Paulo, São Paulo
- Coordinates: 23.462565°S 46.637074°W
- Area: 174 hectares (430 acres)
- Designation: State park
- Created: 1896

The Albert Löfgren State Park (Portuguese: Parque Estadual Alberto Löfgren), commonly known as the São Paulo Forest Gardens (Portuguese: Horto Florestal de São Paulo) is a state park in the state of São Paulo, Brazil.

== Location ==
The Albert Löfgren State Park is in the north of the city of São Paulo, adjoining the Cantareira State Park. It has an area of 174 hectares (430 acres). About 35 hectares (86 acres) of the park are public space. It is open every day from 6am to 6pm. The park gets about 720,000 visitors each year.

== History ==
The area was expropriated by the Engenho da Pedra Branca in 1896 to hold a botanical garden. The Swedish naturalist and botanist Albert Löfgren created the park and was the first director, from 1907 to 1909. The garden became the base for the Forest Service, today the Forest Institute of the São Paulo Secretariat of the Environment. Pines planted when the park was founded can still be seen in the Albert Löefgren Arboretum.

== Facilities ==
The park has a stage for events, picnic area, playground, changing room, jogging track, sports court, soccer fields, exercise equipment, drinking water, lakes and toilets. It contains an environmental education center, the Summer Palace of the state government and the headquarters of the state military police and forest police. The Octavio Vecchi Museum, or Wood Museum, was inaugurated in 1931. It has the largest collection of different woods in Latin America. The wood samples have engravings of the leaves and fruit of the tree they came from. The floor and ceiling are also made of wood samples. There is a monument marking the Tropic of Capricorn, which passes through the park. There are no snack bars in the park, but there are places to eat around the main entrance.

Vegetation includes exotic species such as eucalyptus, pinheiro-do-brejo (Taxodium distichum) and cryptomeria, as well as native trees such as pau-brasil (Caesalpinia echinata), carvalho-nacional (Quercus faginea), pau-ferro (Libidibia ferrea) and jatobá (Hymenaea courbaril). Fauna include robust capuchin monkeys, Brazilian squirrel (Sciurus aestuans), opossums (Didelphis), toucans, storks, herons, rufous-collared sparrow (Zonotrichia capensis) and kingfishers.

== Sources ==
- Costa, Tainá (30 June 2016), Horto Florestal (in Portuguese), City of São Paulo, archived from the original on 2014-05-02
- "Horto Florestal de São Paulo ou Parque Estadual Albert Löfgren", Áreas Verdes das Cidades (in Portuguese), 21 June 2012
