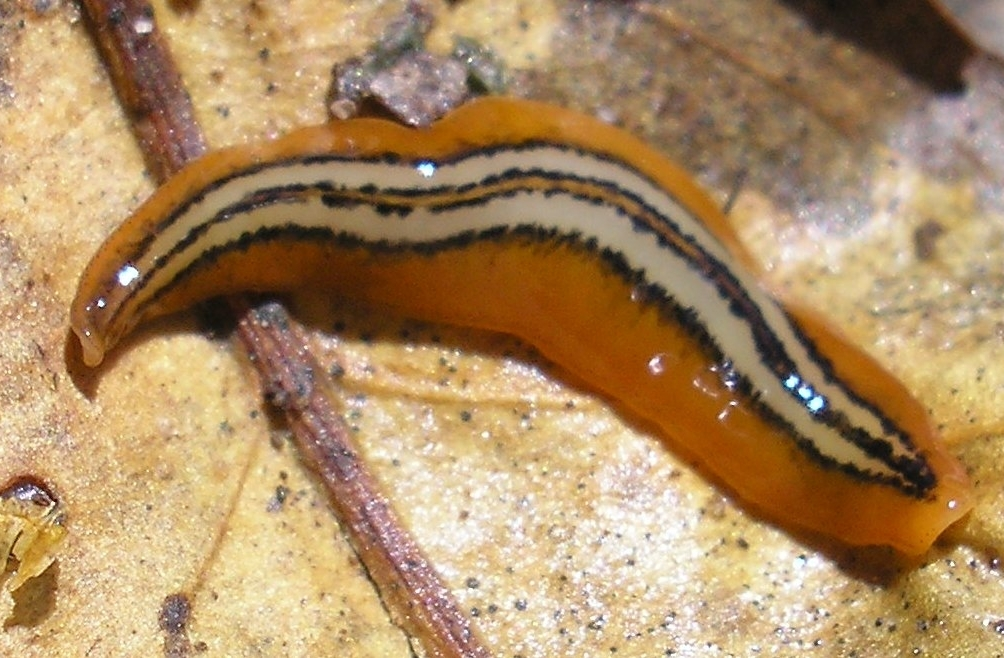
- Cratera pseudovaginuloides

Scientific classification
- Kingdom: Animalia
- Phylum: Platyhelminthes
- Order: Tricladida
- Family: Geoplanidae
- Subfamily: Geoplaninae
- Genus: Cratera; Carbayo et al., 2013

Type species
- Geoplana pseudovaginuloides Riester, 1938

= Cratera (flatworm) =

Genus of flatworms

Cratera is a genus of land planarians belonging to the family Geoplanidae found in South America.

== Description ==
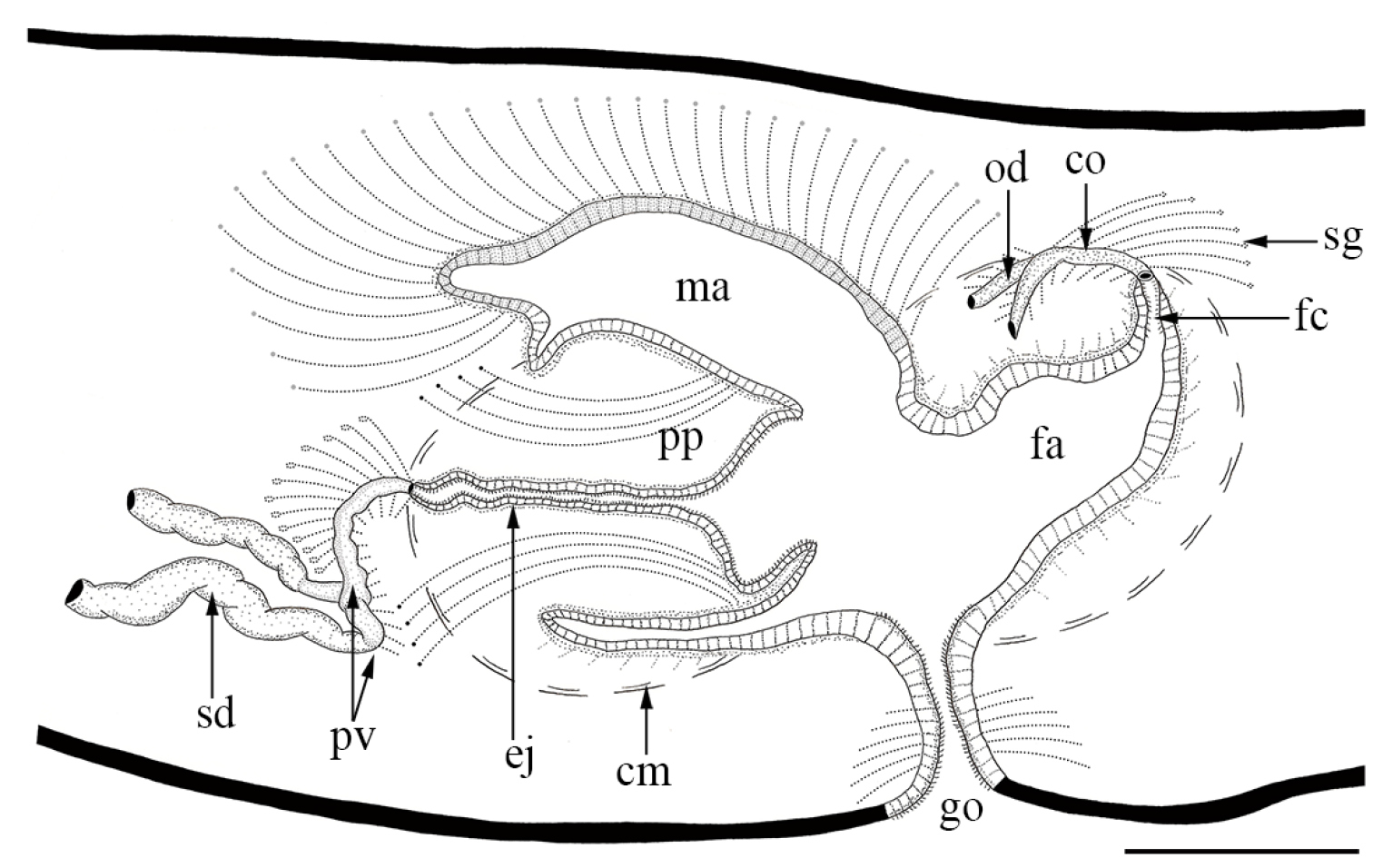
Sagittal view of the copulatory apparatus of Cratera viridimaculata showing the expanded cavity at the final portion of the ejaculatory duct (ej) in the penis papilla (pp).

The genus Cratera is characterized by having a leaf-shaped body. Most species are between 3 and 7 cm long. The hundreds of eyes distributed along the body are monolobulated, i.e., simple and circular. The copulatory apparatus has a permanent conical penis occupying the entire male cavity. The final portion of the ejaculatory duct, the channel that guides sperm through the penis, has an expanded cavity that resembles a volcanic crater. It is very similar to the related genus Obama, the main difference being the presence of trilobulated eyes in the latter.

== Etymology ==
The name Cratera is derived from the Latin word crater and refers to the cavity in the penis that resembles a volcanic crater.

== Species ==
There are 24 species assigned to the genus Cratera:

- Cratera anamariae Carbayo & Almeida, 2015
- Cratera arucuia Lago-Barcia & Carbayo, 2018
- Cratera assu Araujo, Carbayo, Riutort & Álvarez-Presas, 2020
- Cratera aureomaculata Rossi & Leal-Zanchet, 2017
- Cratera boja Araujo, Carbayo, Riutort & Álvarez-Presas, 2020
- Cratera crioula (E. M. Froehlich, 1955)
- Cratera cryptolineata Rossi & Leal-Zanchet, 2017
- Cratera cuarassu Carbayo & Almeida, 2015
- Cratera hina (Marcus, 1951)
- Cratera imbiri Araujo, Carbayo, Riutort & Álvarez-Presas, 2020
- Cratera joia (Froehlich, 1956)
- Cratera nigrimarginata Rossi & Leal-Zanchet, 2017
- Cratera ochra Rossi, Amaral, Ribeiro, Cauduro, Fick, Valiati & Leal-Zanchet, 2015
- Cratera obsidiana Amaral, Boll & Leal-Zanchet, 2019
- Cratera paraitinga Araujo, Carbayo, Riutort & Álvarez-Presas, 2020
- Cratera picuia Lago-Barcia & Carbayo, 2018
- Cratera pseudovaginuloides (Riester, 1938)
- Cratera steffeni Rossi, Fontoura, Amaral & Leal-Zanchet, 2014
- Cratera tamoia (E. M. Froehlich, 1955)
- Cratera taxiarcha (Marcus, 1951)
- Cratera tui Araujo, Carbayo, Riutort & Álvarez-Presas, 2020
- Cratera viridimaculata Negrete & Brusa, 2016
- Cratera yara (E. M. Froehlich, 1955)
