= Cantareira State Park =

State park in São Paulo, Brazil

- Parque Estadual da Cantareira
- IUCN category II (national park)
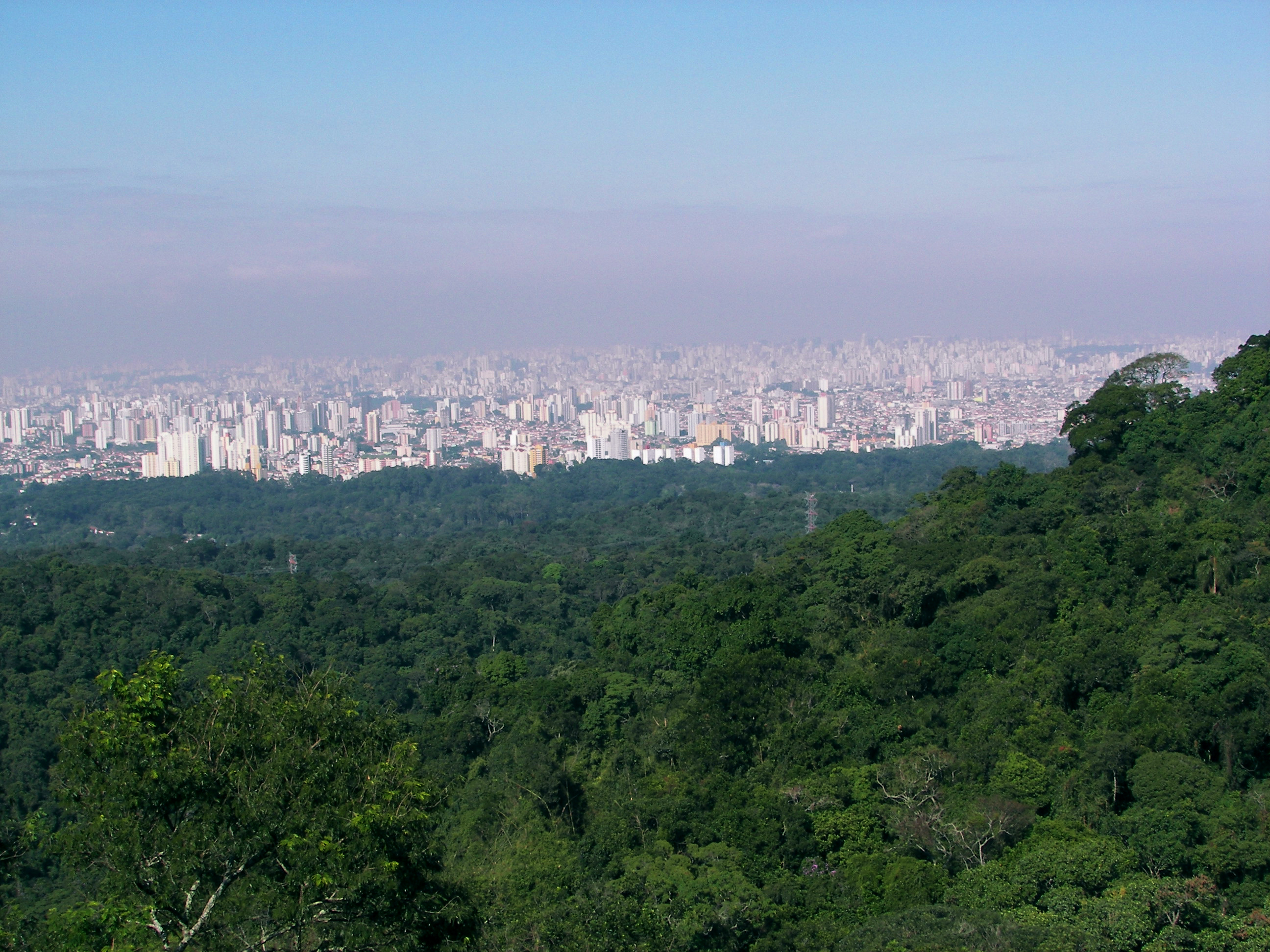
- São Paulo from the Pedra Grande center in the park

- Location within Brazil
- Nearest city: São Paulo, São Paulo
- Coordinates: 23.401389°S 46.59°W
- Area: 7,916.52 hectares (19,562.1 acres)
- Designation: State park
- Created: 29 August 1962

The Cantareira State Park (Portuguese: Parque Estadual da Cantareira) is a state park in the Serra da Cantareira mountain range, in the state of São Paulo, Brazil. It protects an area of Atlantic Forest to the north of the city of São Paulo. In October 1994, UNESCO declared it part of the São Paulo City Green Belt Biosphere Reserve. The park covers 7,916.52 hectares (19,562.1 acres), being part of Serra da Cantareira, the largest urban green area in the country (64,800 hectares) and one of the largest in the world.

== Location ==
The Cantareira State Park is divided between the municipalities of São Paulo: 4,278.50 hectares (10,572.4 acres), Guarulhos: 2,674.33 hectares (6,608.4 acres), Mairiporã: 798.00 hectares (1,971.9 acres) and Caieiras: 149.17 hectares (368.6 acres) in the state of São Paulo. It has a total area of 7,916.52 hectares (19,562.1 acres). It holds an important remnant of Atlantic Forest. It adjoins the 174 hectares (430 acres) Albert Löfgren State Park to the south. It protects an area of the Serra da Cantareira that provides an important part of the city's water supply.

There are four visitor centers: Pedra Grande, Engordador, Águas Claras and Cabuçu. The Pedra Grande center has a lookout over the city at 1,010 metres (3,310 ft) of altitude. The park is open for scheduled school groups during the week, and to the general public on weekends. It is an important leisure alternative for the surrounding communities. It is used extensively for research, and is considered by BirdLife International as an important area for bird conservation in Brazil.

== Environment ==
The park is mostly covered in dense montane rainforest in various stages of regeneration that started at the end of the 19th century when the land was acquired for the water supply of the city of São Paulo. Most of the forest is in the middle stage of regeneration. There are few significant areas of forest in advanced or mature stages. Of the flora, 678 species have been identified in 338 genera and 120 families. 650 species are angiosperms (Magnoliophyta), one is a gymnosperm (Pinophyta) and 27 are pteridophytes (Pteridophyta).

There are an estimated 866 species of fauna in the park. There are 388 species of vertebrates of which 97 are mammals, 233 are birds, 28 are amphibians, 20 are reptiles and 10 are fish. 478 species of invertebrates have been recorded including 91 of bees, 303 arachnids, 62 of ants and 22 species of culicidae.

The urban areas that surround the park and the roads that cut through it result in waste disposal in the park and other forms of degradation.

== History ==
Studies as early as 1852 indicated that springs in the mountains to the north of São Paulo could be used to avoid any problems with water supply for the city. By 1870 the city had 20,000 people. The Cantareira Company was founded in 1878 to supply a city expected to have 60,000 inhabitants by the end of the century. The 1892 census showed there were 120,000 inhabitants. The governor of the state cancelled the Cantareira Company's contract, bought its properties in the mountains and expanded the protected area to support construction of a series of dams: Cuca, Olaria, Itagussu, Divisa, Manino, Bispo, Guaraú, Cassununga and Engordador.

By 1899 the population had grown to 240,000 inhabitants, and the protected area had been defined as a "forest reserve". State law 6.884 of 1962 transformed it into the Cantareira State Park. The state park was created on 29 August 1962, confirmed by decree 41,626 of 30 January 1963. State law 10.228 of 24 September 1968 provided for the creation of the Cantareira Tourist State Park. UNESCO recognized the park on 9 June 1994 as the nucleus of the Biosphere Reserve of the Green Belt of the City of São Paulo. The consultative council was created on 1 April 2003. As of 2009 the park was receiving about 60,000 visitors each year. As of 2016 the Cantareira water system, now operated by Sabesp, was one of the largest in the world, serving about 8.8 million people with 33,000 liters of water per second.

== Sources ==
- Costa, Tainá (30 June 2016), Horto Florestal (in Portuguese), City of São Paulo, archived from the original on 2014-05-02
- Leonel, Cristiane (June 2009), Plano de Manejo do Parque Estadual da Cantareira: Resumo Executivo (PDF) (in Portuguese), SEMA/SP
- Parque Estadual da Cantareira (in Portuguese), SAP: Sistema Ambiental Paulista, archived from the original on 2016-09-16
- Sistema de áreas protegidas do Contínuo da Cantareira (in Portuguese), Fundação Florestal
