= Três Barras National Forest =

National florest of three bars on federal level, localized in Tres Barras (SC)

- Floresta Nacional de Três Barras
- IUCN category VI (protected area with sustainable use of natural resources)
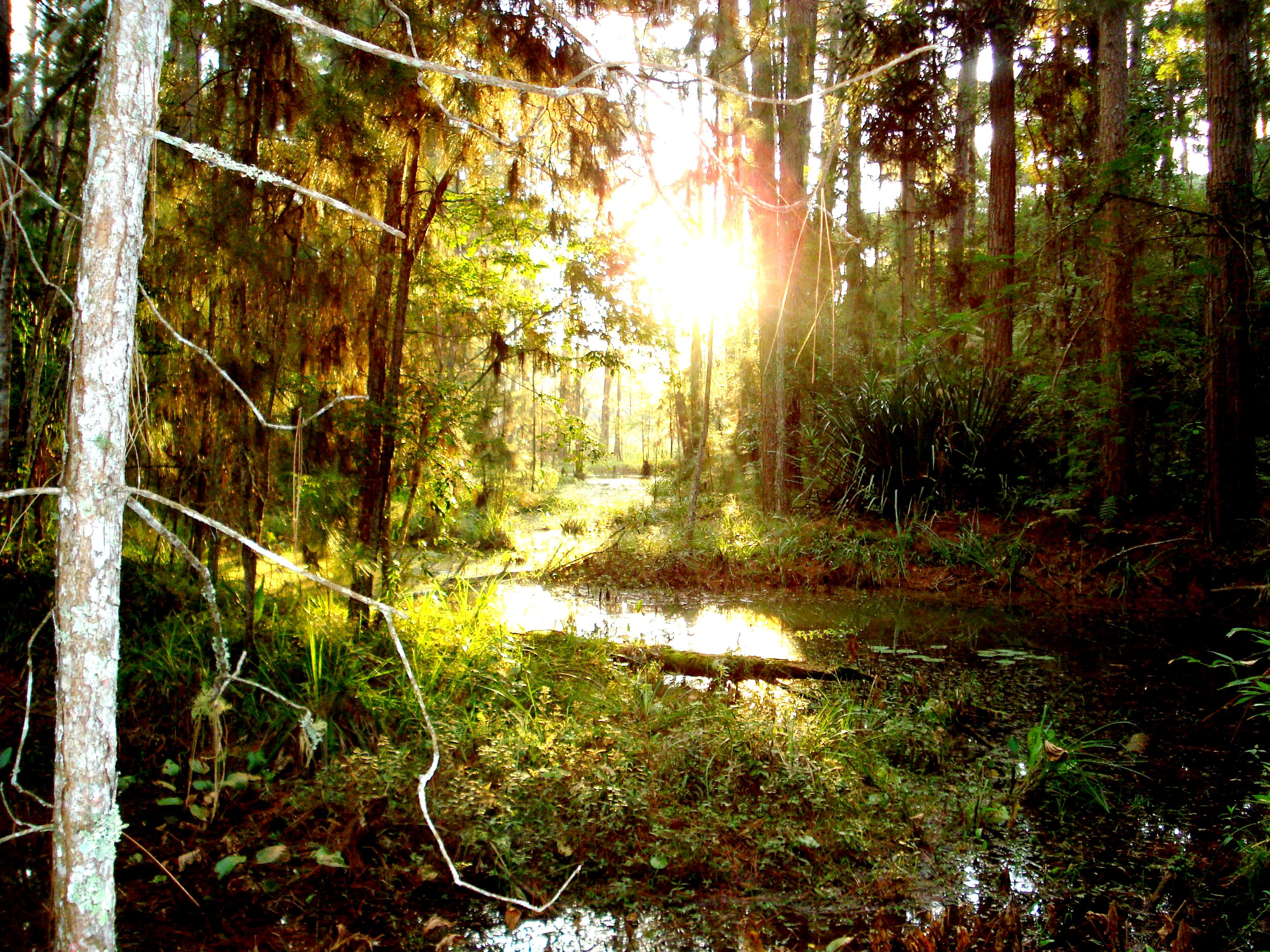
- Plantation of Pinus elliottii in the Três Barras National Forest

- Location within Brazil
- Nearest city: Três Barras
- Coordinates: 26°13′10″S 50°18′18″W
- Area: 4,385.33 hectares (10,836.4 acres)
- Designation: National forest
- Established: 1944
- Governing body: Chico Mendes Institute for Biodiversity Conservation

The National Forest of Três Barras is a Federal Conservation Unit of sustainable use, managed by the Chico Mendes Institute for Biodiversity Conservation - ICMBio, in the municipality of Três Barras, Santa Catarina, Brazil.

== History ==
The National Pine Institute (Instituto Nacional do Pinho), a federal agency concerned with pine trees, created in 1944 the Rio dos Pardos Forest Station, which later became the Joaquim Fiuza Ramos Forest Park in Três Barras, aiming to implement a reforestation plan, especially with Araucaria angustifolia. With the extinction of the National Pine Institute in 1967, the area passed to the Brazilian Institute of Forest Development when the cultivation of Pinus elliottii had already begun (1327 ha between 1957 and 1981). In 1968, the area was named Floresta Nacional de Três Barras (Três Barras National Forest) by the ordinance 560 of the Brazilian Institute of Forest Development.

After the extinction of the Brazilian Institute of Forest Development in 1989, the area started to be managed by the Brazilian Institute of Environment and Renewable Natural Resources. Currently, it is managed by the Chico Mendes Institute for Biodiversity Conservation - (ICMBio), a federal organization created in 2007.

== Characterization of the area ==
The Três Barras National Forest occupies an area of 4383.33 ha. It is a unit of federal conservation for sustainable use in the category National Forest. It aims to promote multiple and sustainable use of natural resources and scientific research, highlighting methods for the sustainable exploitation of the native flora.

== Visitation ==
The Três Barras National Forest receives a mean of 4 thousand visitors per year, who use the Conservation Unit for research, environmental education, leisure, tourism for nature contemplation and historical heritage. The visitors include students of private and public school, as well as university students, researchers and general public.
