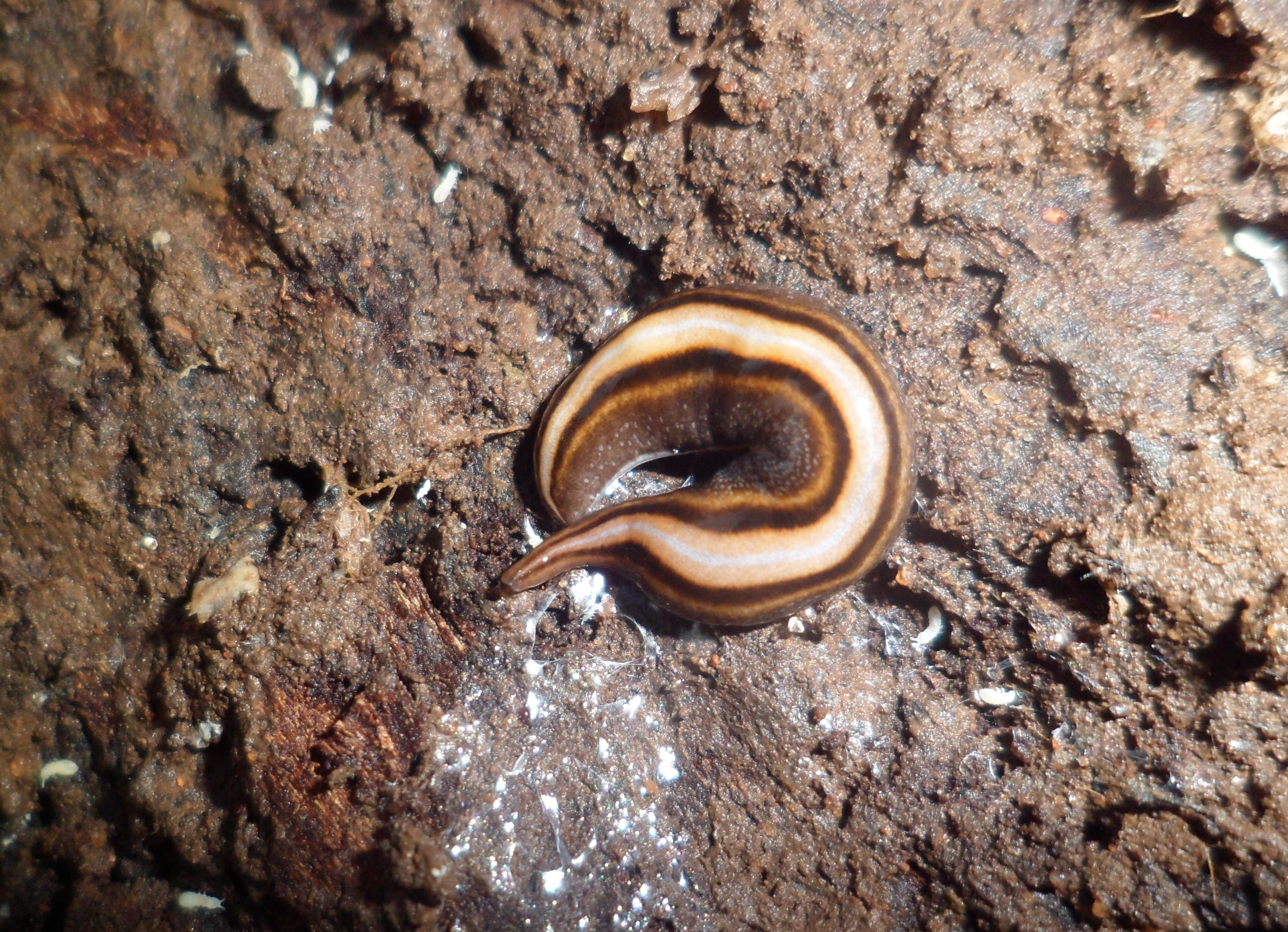
- Paraparaba hortulana

Scientific classification
- Kingdom: Animalia
- Phylum: Platyhelminthes
- Order: Tricladida
- Family: Geoplanidae
- Subfamily: Geoplaninae
- Genus: Paraparaba; Rossi, Boll & Leal-Zanchet, 2024

Type species
- Geoplana rubidolineata Baptista & Leal-Zanchet, 2005

= Paraparaba =

Genus of flatworms

Paraparaba is a genus of land planarians from South America.

== Description ==
Species of the genus Paraparaba have a slender body with nearly parallel margins while creeping. The largest specimens may reach about 8 cm in length. Both sides of the body are slightly convex. The pharynx is cylindrical and the prostatic vesicle is extrabulbar. The copulatory apparatus has a permanent, protrusible, conical penis occupying the entire male cavity, which is unfolded, and the female cavity is rounded and filled with a multilayered epithelium.

== Taxonomy ==
Species in the genus Paraparaba were first assigned to a genus named Paraba, of which the chosen type species was Geoplana multicolor Graff, 1899. However, this was based on specimens that are not conspecific with the holotype of Geoplana multicolor. An analysis of the holotype indicated that it matches the definition of the genus Geoplana and not Paraba. This made Paraba become a junior synonym of Geoplana and the new name Paraparaba was chosen to include species previously in Paraba.

== Etymology ==
Paraparaba means multicolored, with many colors in the Tupi language. It is formed by a reduplication of the word Paraba meaning variegated, and alludes to the name of the species Geoplana multicolor, which was originally chosen as the type species of Paraba. The name could also be interpreted as coming from Greek para, beside, plus the name of the former genus Paraba.

== Species ==
The following species are recognised in the genus Paparaba:

- Paraparaba aurantia Marques & Leal-Zanchet, 2022
- Paraparaba bresslaui (Schirch, 1929)
- Paraparaba caapora (Froehlich, 1958)
- Paraparaba cassula (E. M. Froehlich, 1955)
- Paraparaba franciscana (Leal-Zanchet & Carbayo, 2001)
- Paraparaba gaucha (Froehlich, 1959)
- Paraparaba goettei (Schirch, 1929)
- Paraparaba hortulana Rossi & Leal-Zanchet, 2023
- Paraparaba iguassuensis Peres, Rossi & Leal-Zanchet, 2020
- Paraparaba incognita (Riester, 1938)
- Paraparaba impositrix Rossi, Boll & Leal-Zanchet, 2024
- Paraparaba pankaru Amaral & Leal-Zanchet, 2019
- Paraparaba phocaica (Marcus, 1951)
- Paraparaba piriana (Almeida & Carbayo, 2012)
- Paraparaba preta (Riester, 1938)
- Paraparaba pseudogaucha Rossi & Leal-Zanchet, 2023
- Paraparaba rubidolineata (Baptista & Leal-Zanchet, 2005)
- Paraparaba smaragdina Rossi, Negrete & Leal-Zanchet, 2020
- Paraparaba suva (Froehlich, 1959)
- Paraparaba tapira (Froehlich, 1958)
- Paraparaba tata Bolonhezi, Lago-Barcia & Carbayo, 2020
- Paraparaba tingauna (Kishimoto & Carbayo, 2012)
- Paraparaba viricornuta Rossi & Leal-Zanchet, 2023
