= Ana Maria Leal-Zanchet =

Brazilian zoologist and academic

- Born: 20 January 1966 (age 60); Natal, Brazil
- Education: Universidade do Estado do Rio Grande do Norte; Pontifical Catholic University of Rio Grande do Sul; University of Tübingen
- Known for: Research on land planarians
- Scientific career
- Fields: Zoology
- Workplaces: University of Vale do Rio dos Sinos

Ana Maria Leal-Zanchet (born 20 January 1966) is a Brazilian zoologist and academic.

== Academic career ==
Leal-Zanchet obtained her first academic degree at the Universidade do Estado do Rio Grande do Norte. She subsequently earned a master's degree in zoology from the Pontifical Catholic University of Rio Grande do Sul.

Between 1991 and 1995, she undertook doctoral studies in Special Zoology at the University of Tübingen in Germany, where she received her doctorate in 1995.

Following her doctorate, Leal-Zanchet took up a teaching position at the University of Vale do Rio dos Sinos (UNISINOS) in Brazil.

=== Research ===
At UNISINOS, Leal-Zanchet leads a research group dedicated to land planarians (Planárias) and a histology laboratory.

Her research focuses on the systematics, functional morphology, and ecology of planarians.

The work of her research group has contributed to the first descriptions of more than 40 species. Among the taxa described through this research are the land planarian species Cratera aureomaculata and Cratera nigrimarginata, as well as the genera Difroehlichia and Supramontana.
