= Ejaculatory duct =

Male anatomical structures

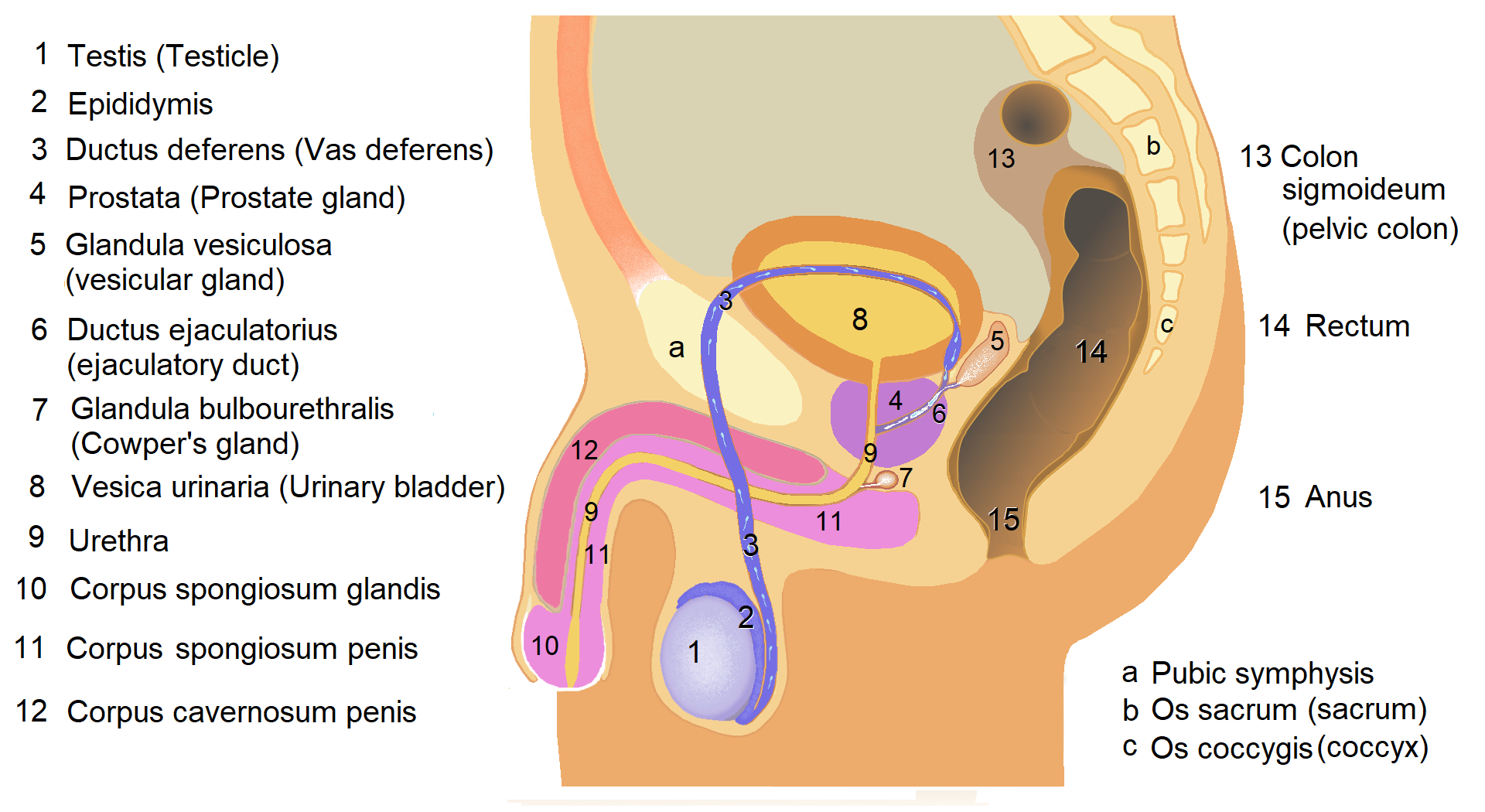
- Male anatomy

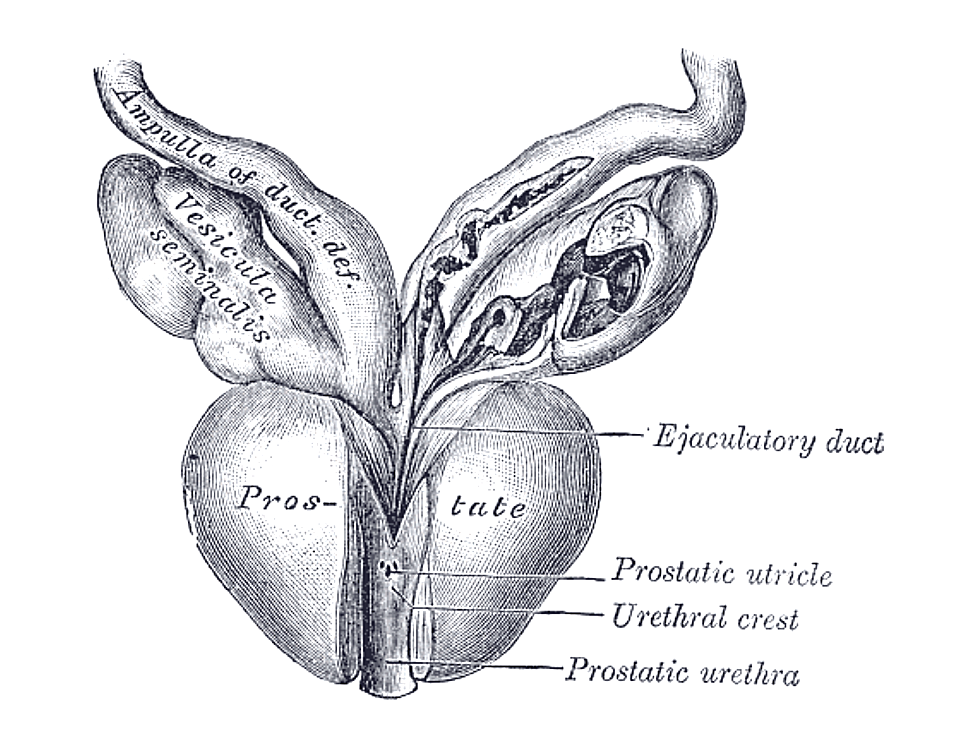
- Vesiculae seminales and ampullæ of ductus deferentes, seen from the front. The anterior walls of the left ampulla, left seminal vesicle, and prostatic urethra have been cut away.

Details
- Artery: Inferior vesical artery, middle rectal artery

Identifiers
- Latin: ductus ejaculatorius (pl.: ductus ejaculatorii)
- MeSH: D004543
- TA98: A09.3.07.001
- TA2: 3636
- FMA: 19325

The ejaculatory ducts (ductus ejaculatorii) are paired structures in the male reproductive system. Each ejaculatory duct is formed by the union of the vas deferens with the duct of the seminal vesicle. They pass through the prostate, and open into the urethra above the seminal colliculus. During ejaculation, semen passes through the prostate gland, enters the urethra and exits the body via the urinary meatus.

== Function ==
=== Ejaculation ===
Ejaculation occurs in two stages, the emission stage and the expulsion stage. The emission stage involves the workings of several structures of the ejaculatory duct; contractions of the prostate gland, the seminal vesicles, the bulbourethral gland and the vas deferens push fluids into the prostatic urethra. The semen is stored here until ejaculation occurs. Muscles at the base of the penis contract in order to propel the seminal fluid trapped in the prostatic urethra through the penile urethra and expel it through the urinary meatus. The ejaculate is expelled in spurts, due to the movement of the muscles propelling it. These muscle contractions are related to the sensations of orgasm for the male.

Sperm are produced in the testes and enter the ejaculatory ducts via the vas deferens. As they pass by the seminal vesicles, a fluid rich in fructose combines with the sperm. This addition nourishes the sperm in order to keep them active and motile. Seminal fluid continues down the ejaculatory duct into the prostate gland, where an alkaline prostatic fluid is added. This addition provides the texture and odor associated with semen. The alkalinity of the prostatic fluid serves to neutralize the acidity of the female vaginal tract in order to prolong the survival of sperm in this harsh environment. Semen is now a fructose-rich, alkaline fluid containing sperm as it enters the bulbourethral glands below the prostate. The bulbourethral glands secrete a small amount of clear fluid into the urethra before the ejaculate is expelled. The functions of this fluid are not entirely known but are suggested to aid in lubricating the male urethra in preparation for the semen during ejaculation. The amount of semen produced and expelled during ejaculation corresponds to the length of time that the male is sexually aroused before ejaculation occurs. Generally, the longer the period of arousal, the larger the amount of seminal fluid.

Ejaculation and orgasm may occur simultaneously, however they are not coupled, in that one may occur without the other. For example, a man may have a dry orgasm (termed retrograde ejaculation); there is no expulsion of ejaculate however the man still experiences orgasm. Also, paraplegics may ejaculate seminal fluid but not experience the sensation of orgasm.

== Clinical relevance ==
=== Ejaculatory duct obstruction ===
Ejaculatory duct obstruction is an acquired or congenital pathological condition in which one or both ejaculatory ducts are obstructed. In the case that both ejaculatory ducts are obstructed, this illness presents with the symptoms of aspermia and male infertility.

=== Benign prostatic hyperplasia ===
Surgery to correct benign prostatic hyperplasia may destroy these ducts resulting in retrograde ejaculation. Retrograde ejaculation empties the seminal fluid formed in the emission phase into the bladder of the male instead of expelling it through the urethra and out the tip of the penis. This results in a dry orgasm, where orgasm may still be experienced but without expulsion of semen from the ejaculatory ducts.

== Additional images ==
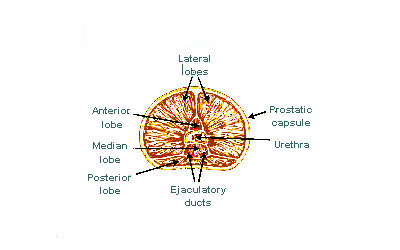
Lobes of prostate

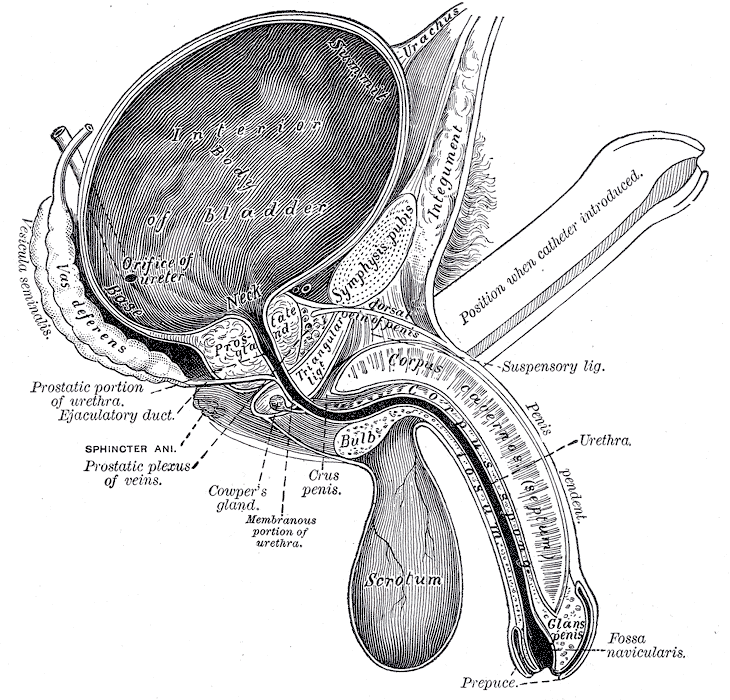
Vertical section of bladder, penis and urethra

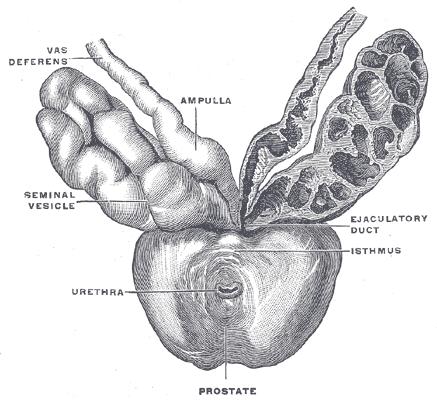
Prostate with seminal vesicles and seminal ducts, viewed from in front and above

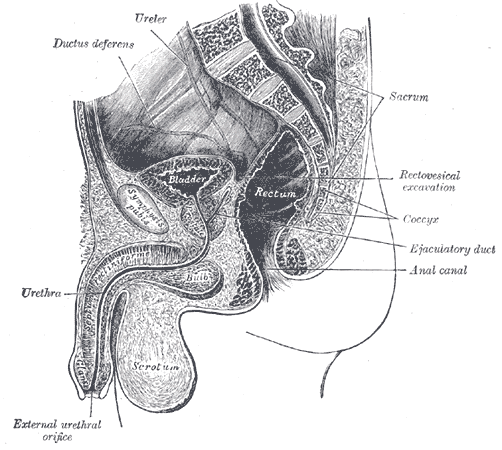
Median sagittal section of male pelvis

Dissection of prostate showing ejaculatory ducts opening into the prostatic urethra

== See also ==
- Excretory duct of seminal gland
- Seminal vesicles
- Prostate
