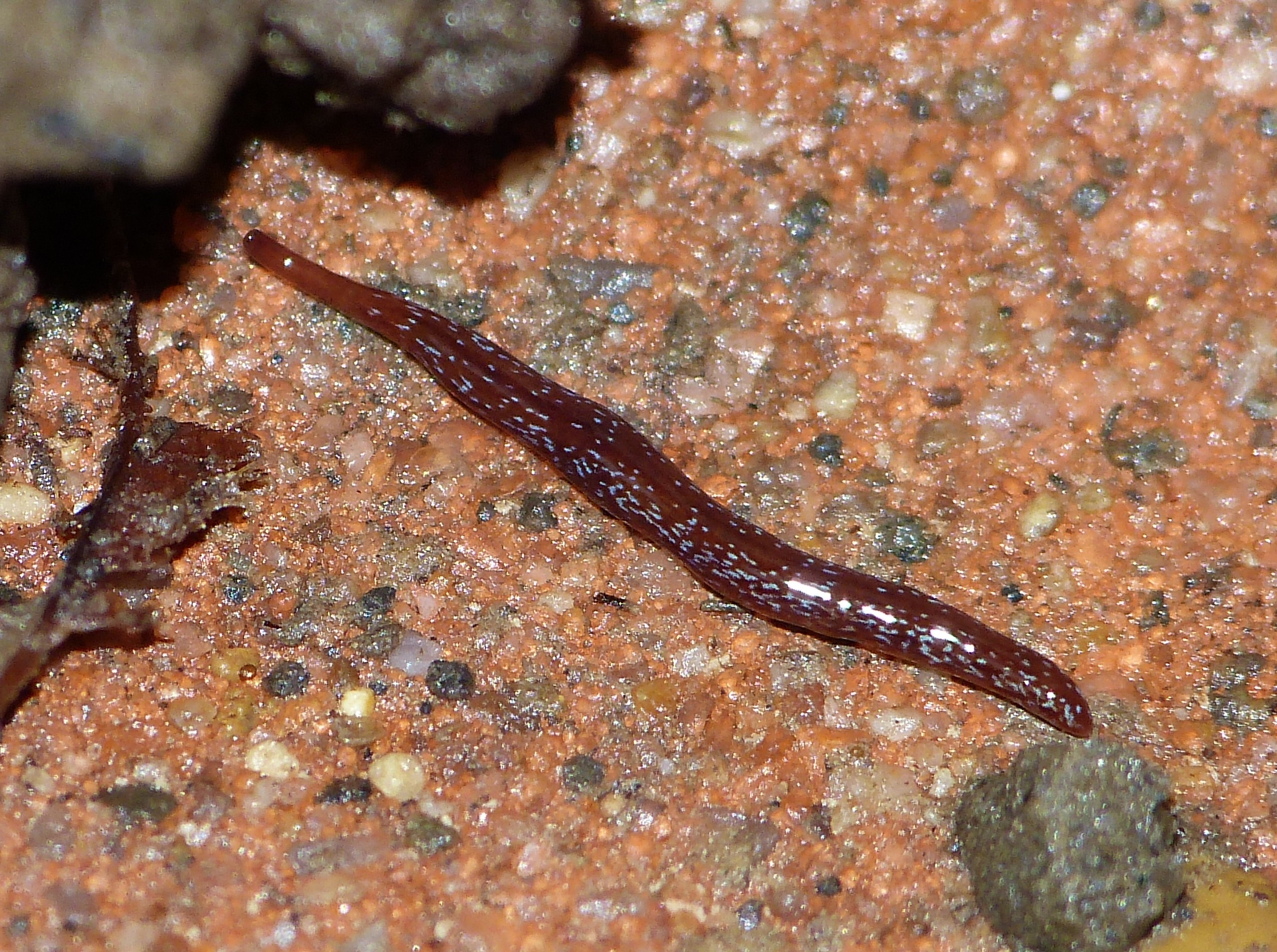
- Marionfyfea adventor

Scientific classification
- Kingdom: Animalia
- Phylum: Platyhelminthes
- Order: Tricladida
- Family: Geoplanidae
- Subfamily: Rhynchodeminae
- Tribe: Anzoplanini; Winsor, 2006

Genera
- See text.

= Anzoplanini =

Tribe of flatworms

Anzoplanini is a tribe of land planarians in the subfamily Rhynchodeminae.

== Description ==
The tribe Anzoplanini contains land planarians with dorsoventral testes, a condition that in land planarians is considered intermediate between a primitive ventral condition and a derived dorsal condition. The mesenchymal musculature contains longitudinal fibers forming either a ventral plate or a ring around the intestine.

== Genera ==
Currently, the tribe Anzoplanini comprises the following genera:

- Anzoplana Winsor, 2006
- Marionfyfea Winsor, 2011 (replacement name for Fyfea Winsor, 2006, preoccupied)
