= Argaplana =

Scientific classification
- Kingdom: Animalia
- Phylum: Platyhelminthes
- Order: Tricladida
- Family: Geoplanidae
- Tribe: Argaplanini; Winsor, 2011
- Genus: Argaplana; Winsor, 2011
- Species: A. ranuii

Binomial name
- Argaplana ranuii (Fyfe, 1953) Winsor, 2011

Synonyms
- Geoplana ranuii Fyfe, 1953; Kontikia ranuii (Fyfe, 1953)

Genus of flatworms

Argaplana is a genus of land planarians, the only member of the tribe Argaplanini in the family Rhynchodeminae. It contains the sole species Argaplana ranuii. It is native to New Zealand.

== Description ==
The tribe Argaplanini is characterized by pigment cup eyes in multiple rows around the body's front tip that continue to the back end along the dorsal side, ventral testes and efferent ducts, tripartite cutaneous musculature, cutaneous longitudinal muscles in bundles, a lack of a ring zone, and a creeping sole that is over half of the body width.

The genus Argaplana is characterized by a small, tapered body with a mouth at the mid-third of the body, muscles that are longitudinal, circular, and helical, a penis lacking papilla, ovovitelline ducts that unite then enter the female genital canal ventro-posteriorly, and a lack of a resorptive bursa, adenodactyls and a viscid gland.

Argaplana ranuii is a cream-white color with a slightly paler creeping sole. Its body has a blunt front end and a rounded back end. Multiple eyes are crowded around the front tip.

== Etymology ==
The generic name of Argaplana, and the tribe name by extension, are derived from Argus Panoptes, the many-eyed giant of Greek mythology, and the Latin word plana, meaning "planarian". This is in reference to the planarian's several eyes at its anterior tip.

The origin of the specific epithet of Argoplana ranuii was never specified by Marion Fyfe, who originally described the type species as Geoplana ranuii. No landmarks named "Ranui" were present in the Campbell Islands where the type specimens were collected; because of this, the name is assumed to either be named after the motor vessel Ranui that served the Cape Expedition program or Ranui Cove, which was named after said ship, located in the neighboring Auckland Islands. It could also be referring to the suburb of Rānui in West Auckland.
