= Elizabeth Edgar =

New Zealand botanist (1929–2019)

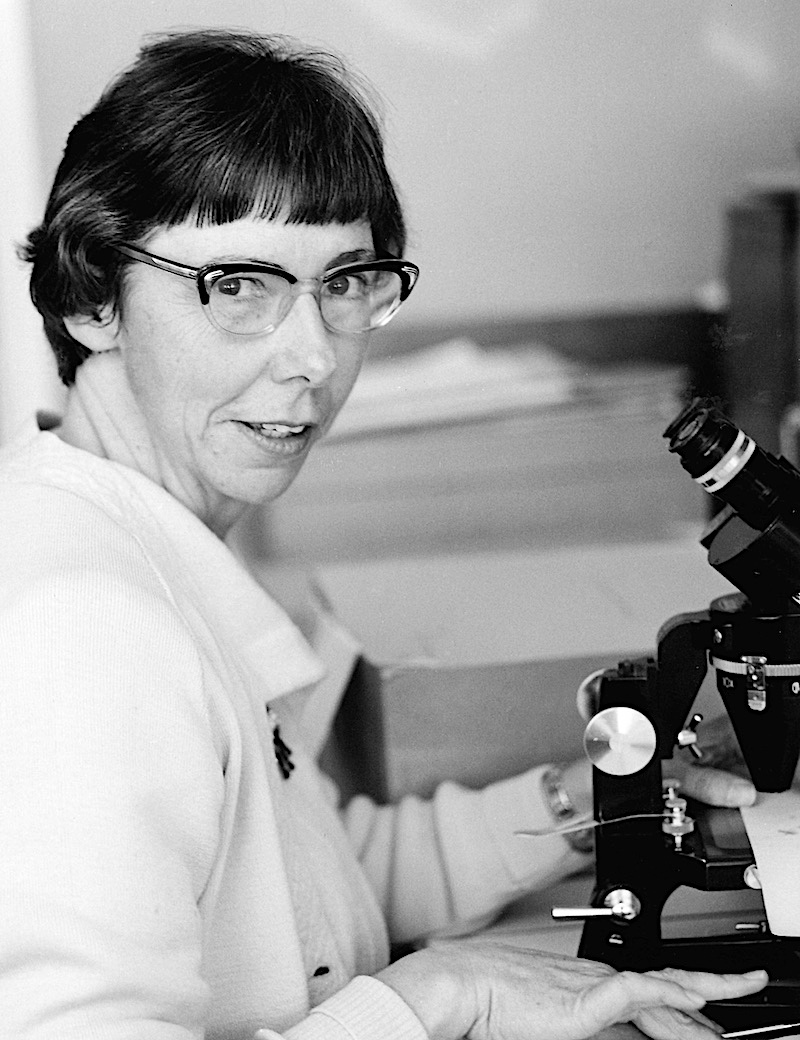
- Edgar c. 1970, DSIR
- Born: 27 December 1929; Christchurch, New Zealand
- Died: 1 January 2019 (aged 89); Christchurch, New Zealand
- Occupation: Botanist
- Years active: 1952–2010
- Notable work: Co-author of 3 of the 5 volumes of the series Flora of New Zealand
- Relatives: Marion Fyfe (aunt)

Elizabeth Edgar (27 December 1929 – 1 January 2019) was a New Zealand botanist, best known for her work in authoring and editing three of the five volumes of the series Flora of New Zealand, which describes and classifies the species of flora of the country. She was most noted for her taxonomic work on the biodiversity of New Zealand and was recognised as the foremost authority on nomenclature and description of the country's plants.

== Early life ==
Edgar was born on 27 December 1929 in Christchurch, New Zealand, and grew up in Spreydon with her two sisters. Her family were some of the first European settlers of New Zealand and her aunt, Marion Liddell Fyfe, was the first female lecturer in zoology at the University of Otago. She was educated at Rangi Ruru Girls' School in Merivale, and, encouraged by her mother, then attended Canterbury University College. Edgar graduated with a Bachelor of Arts in classics in 1950 and continued her studies while working as a library assistant for the Department of Scientific and Industrial Research (DSIR) earning a Bachelor of Science in botany in 1953. Taking unpaid leave from DSIR, Edgar earned a master's degree with her thesis, "The Special Characteristics of Some New Zealand Cotulas with Particular Reference to their Breeding Systems" in 1957 and then finished her PhD. Her doctoral thesis was "The Cytology of the Shoot Apex in some Dicotyledons" and was completed in 1960 at Canterbury University College.

== Career ==
Edgar returned to DSIR in 1959 working in the Botany Division at the Lincoln facility. She worked with Dr Lucy Moore to revise the naming conventions of New Zealand's monocotyledons, particularly working on the varied and extensive rushes and sedges of the country. Their work was published in 1970 as Volume II of the Flora of New Zealand, which catalogued all types of monocotyledons in New Zealand except the grasses. Continuing her work on monocotyledons, Edgar worked on the Flora of New Zealand Volume III with Arthur Healy to identify both the naturalised and native species within each genus. In addition to her forty-nine research papers and four books concerning her taxonomic research, Edgar assembled a compendium of all of the taxonomy publications of the plants of New Zealand.

Edgar coordinated and supervised the publication of David J. Galloway's volume Flora of New Zealand: Lichens and then worked with Henry E. Connor to compile the extensive taxonomy of New Zealand's grasses. She retired from DSIR in 1988, but continued to work on the grasses project until it was published in 2000 as Volume V of the Flora of New Zealand series. Edgar was for the first time listed at the senior author for a volume of the Flora. Working as a research fellow for Landcare Research, with Connor, also retired but a research fellow at Canterbury University, the two compiled a study of all currently known grasses in the country's biogeographical region. As grasses are the most important flora in terms of economic and ecologic value to the country, the volume was an important contribution to evaluating the biodiversity of the New Zealand. Edgar described 54 new species and subspecies, mostly of grasses, sedges, and rushes, including 11 species in the genus Poa. She was also recognised as an expert in nomenclature and skilled in both Greek and Latin.

Edgar received the New Zealand 1990 Commemoration Medal, and in 1993 the New Zealand Botanical Societies Allan Mere Award. Both Edgar and Connor were recognised with the Royal Society Te Apārangi's Hutton Medal in 2000 for their work. In 2010, the duo published a revision of Volume V. The Flora of New Zealand series are unique, as all of the descriptions are taken from measurements and notes collected in New Zealand, garnering international recognition.

== Death and legacy ==
Edgar died on 1 January 2019, in Christchurch, at the age of 89. She was considered the "foremost authority on naming and describing plants" in New Zealand. Botanist Brian Molloy stated that Edgar would be remembered as one of New Zealand's greatest botanists. Three New Zealand species — Carex edgariae, Juncus edgariae and Libertia edgariae — have been named in her honour.

In 2017, Edgar was selected as one of the Royal Society Te Apārangi's "150 women in 150 words", celebrating the contributions of women to knowledge in New Zealand.
