= Anisorhynchodemus =

Scientific classification
- Kingdom: Animalia
- Phylum: Platyhelminthes
- Order: Tricladida
- Family: Geoplanidae
- Tribe: Rhynchodemini
- Genus: Anisorhynchodemus; Kawakatsu, Froehlich, Jones, Ogren & Sasaki, 2003

Genus of flatworms

Anisorhynchodemus is a genus of land planarians of the tribe Rhynchodemini. It was erected to include species lacking sufficient morphological information to allow them to be classified in the appropriate genus.

== Taxonomy ==
Many species of land planarians described during the second half of the 19th century and the first half of the 20th century were classified based solely on external characters. Currently, land planarian genera are highly based on internal anatomy, especially the anatomy of the copulatory apparatus. Consequently, species with old descriptions that were never redescribed, so that their internal anatomy remains unknown, cannot be assigned to the correct genus. Thus, the genus Anisorhynchodemus was erected to temporarily accommodate species of the tribe Rhynchodemini whose anatomy of the copulatory apparatus is still unknown.

The name of Anisorhynchodemus is derived from the genus Rhynchodemus and the Greek άνισος (ánisos), meaning "unusual, different, irregular, dissimilar".

== Species ==
The genus Anisorhynchodemus currently contains the following species:

- Anisorhynchodemus albicinctus (Graff, 1899)
- Anisorhynchodemus amboinensis (Graff, 1899)
- Anisorhynchodemus assimilis (Geba, 1909)
- Anisorhynchodemus belli (Graff, 1899)
- Anisorhynchodemus bistriatus (Grube, 1868)
- Anisorhynchodemus boehmigi (Graff, 1898)
- Anisorhynchodemus boholicus (Graff, 1899)
- Anisorhynchodemus borelli (Graff, 1894)
- Anisorhynchodemus bosci (Graff, 1899)
- Anisorhynchodemus cameliae (Furhmann, 1912)
- Anisorhynchodemus chuni (Graff, 1899)
- Anisorhynchodemus conradti (Graff, 1899)
- Anisorhynchodemus conspersus (Graff, 1899)
- Anisorhynchodemus cultratus (Graff, 1898)
- Anisorhynchodemus demani (Graff, 1899)
- Anisorhynchodemus diesingi (Graff, 1899)
- Anisorhynchodemus diorchis (Furhmann, 1914)
- Anisorhynchodemus dubius (Spencer, 1892)
- Anisorhynchodemus dugesi (Graff, 1899)
- Anisorhynchodemus excavatus (Graff, 1899)
- Anisorhynchodemus figdori (Graff, 1899)
- Anisorhynchodemus fletcheri (Spencer, 1892)
- Anisorhynchodemus forrestianus (Schröder, 1924)
- Anisorhynchodemus gebaboehmigi Kawakastsu, Froehlich, Jones, Ogren & Sasaki, 2003
- Anisorhynchodemus guttatus (Fletcher & Hamilton, 1888)
- Anisorhynchodemus hallezi (Graff, 1899)
- Anisorhynchodemus insularis (Graff, 1899)
- Anisorhynchodemus joubini (Hallez, 1894)
- Anisorhynchodemus kraepelini (Graff, 1899)
- Anisorhynchodemus laterolineatus (Spencer, 1892)
- Anisorhynchodemus leidyi (Graff, 1899)
- Anisorhynchodemus lindsaysianus (Schröder, 1924)
- Anisorhynchodemus lineolatus (Graff, 1899)
- Anisorhynchodemus lubbocki (Graff, 1899)
- Anisorhynchodemus luteicolli (Graff, 1899)
- Anisorhynchodemus maculatus (Furhmann, 1914)
- Anisorhynchodemus mediolineatus (Spencer, 1892)
- Anisorhynchodemus megophthalma (Loman, 1890)
- Anisorhynchodemus mertoni (Schröder, 1916)
- Anisorhynchodemus michaelsoni (Graff, 1899)
- Anisorhynchodemus miniatus (Graff, 1899)
- Anisorhynchodemus mitchellianus (Schröder, 1924)
- Anisorhynchodemus montanus (Mell, 1904)
- Anisorhynchodemus moseleyi (Fletcher & Hamilton, 1888)
- Anisorhynchodemus nematoides (Loman, 1890)
- Anisorhynchodemus nietneri (Humbert & Claparede, 1862)
- Anisorhynchodemus niger (Fletcher & Hamilton, 1888)
- Anisorhynchodemus nolli (Graff, 1899)
- Anisorhynchodemus obscurus (Fletcher & Hamilton, 1888)
- Anisorhynchodemus pellucidus (Graff, 1899)
- Anisorhynchodemus picta (Graff, 1899)
- Anisorhynchodemus pilleata (Whitehouse, 1915)
- Anisorhynchodemus procera (Graff, 1899)
- Anisorhynchodemus putzei (Graff, 1899)
- Anisorhynchodemus quadristriatus (Grube, 1868)
- Anisorhynchodemus rubrocinctus (Graff, 1899)
- Anisorhynchodemus scriptus (Steel, 1897)
- Anisorhynchodemus septemstriatus (Graff, 1899)
- Anisorhynchodemus sharpi (Graff, 1899)
- Anisorhynchodemus signata (Graff, 1899)
- Anisorhynchodemus simulans (Dendy, 1891)
- Anisorhynchodemus stenopus (Graff, 1894)
- Anisorhynchodemus tabatteldili (Graff, 1899)
- Anisorhynchodemus tetracelis (Haslauer-Gamish, 1981)
- Anisorhynchodemus trilineatus (Fletcher & Hamilton, 1888)
- Anisorhynchodemus tristis (Graff, 1899)
- Anisorhynchodemus varians (Graff, 1899)
- Anisorhynchodemus waburtonianus (Schröder, 1924)
- Anisorhynchodemus whiteleggei (Spencer, 1892)
- Anisorhynchodemus woodassimilis Kawakastsu, Froehlich, Jones, Ogren & Sasaki, 2003
