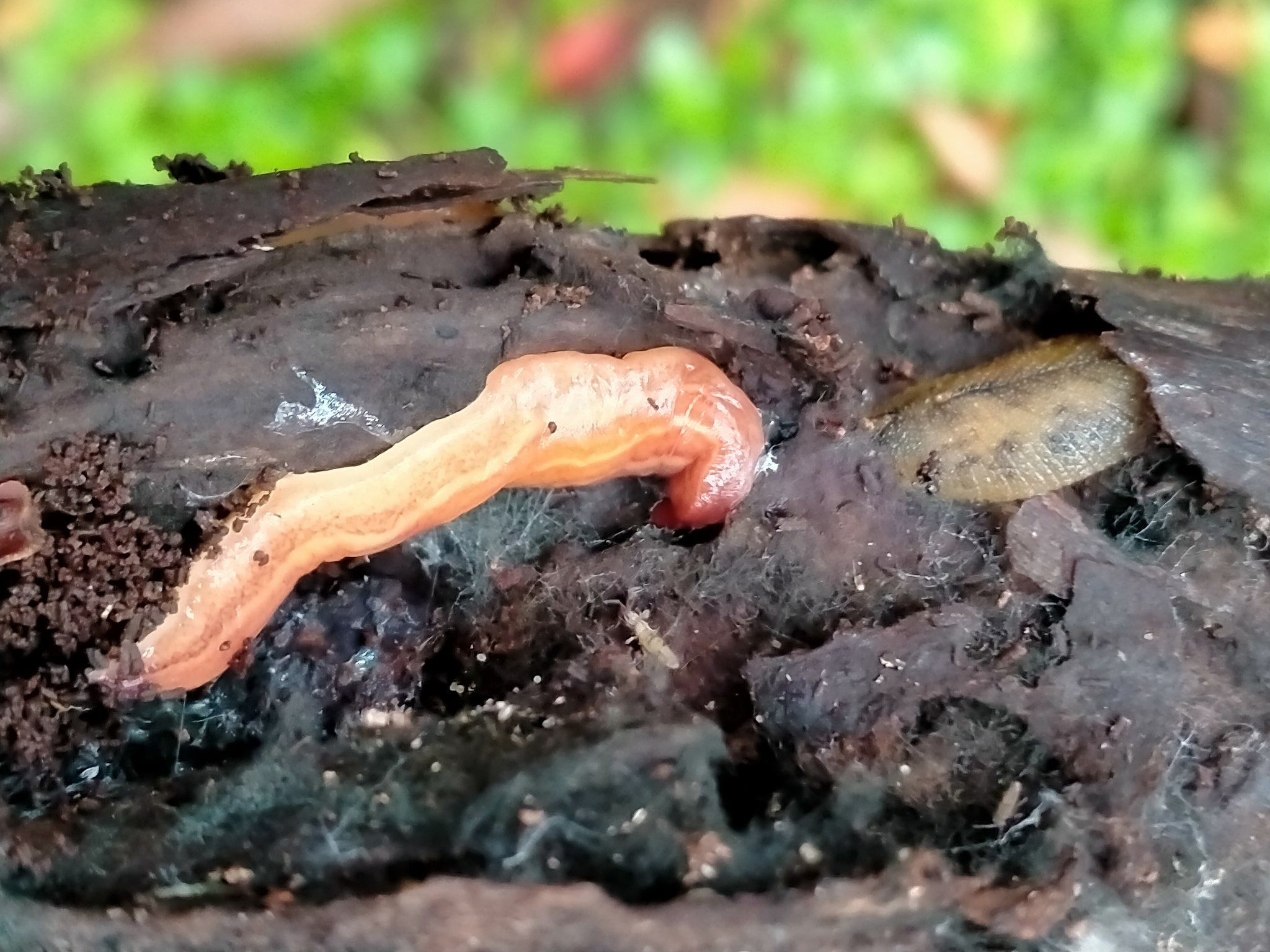
- Marionfyfea carnleyi

Scientific classification
- Kingdom: Animalia
- Phylum: Platyhelminthes
- Order: Tricladida
- Family: Geoplanidae
- Genus: Marionfyfea
- Species: M. carnleyi

Binomial name
- Marionfyfea carnleyi (Fyfe, 1953)

Synonyms
- Artioposthia carnleyi Fyfe, 1953; Fyfea carnleyi Winsor, 2006

= Marionfyfea carnleyi =

Species of flatworm

Marionfyfea carnleyi is a species of land planarian from Sub-Antarctic Islands of New Zealand.

== Description ==
Marionfyfea carnleyi measures about 1 to 2 cm in length. The dorsum is cream and has two broad dark brown lateral stripes, while the venter is uniformly cream. The eyes are arranged in a single row around the body margin, being more concentrated at the anterior end. The pharynx is long and tubular.
