= Pelmatoplana =

Scientific classification
- Kingdom: Animalia
- Phylum: Platyhelminthes
- Order: Tricladida
- Family: Geoplanidae
- Tribe: Pelmatoplaninini
- Genus: Pelmatoplana; Graff, 1896

Type species
- Pelmatoplana moluccana Graff, 1899

Synonyms
- Permatoplana Kawakatsu & Basil, 1971

Genus of flatworms

Pelmatoplana is a genus of land planarians in the tribe Pelmatoplanini.

== Description ==
The genus Pelmatoplana includes planarians with weak cutaneous longitudinal musculature and strong parenchymal musculature forming a ring zone. The copulatory apparatus has a well-developed conical penis papilla and the female atrium lacks a seminal bursa, having only the female canal entering it. A genito-intestinal duct may be present connecting the female canal to the intestine.

== Species ==
The genus Pelmatoplana includes the following species:

- Pelmatoplana bogoriensis Graff, 1899
- Pelmatoplana braueri (Graff, 1899)
- Pelmatoplana graffi Fuhrmann, 1914
- Pelmatoplana japonica (Kaburaki, 1922)
- Pelmatoplana maheensis (Graff, 1899)
- Pelmatoplana moluccana Graff, 1899
- Pelmatoplana pseudophallus de Beauchamp, 1939
