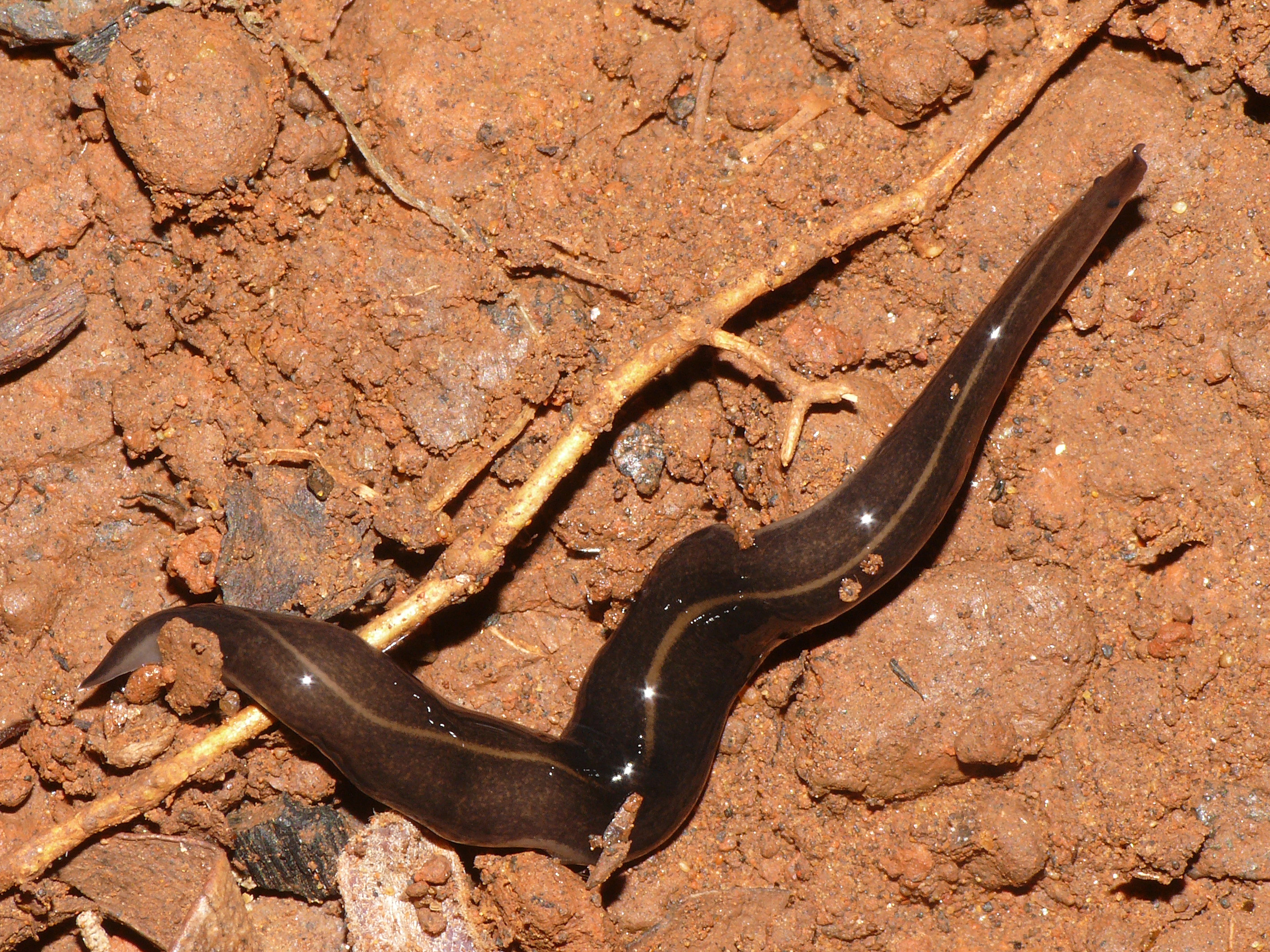
- Platydemus manokwari, head is on the right.

Scientific classification
- Kingdom: Animalia
- Phylum: Platyhelminthes
- Order: Tricladida
- Family: Geoplanidae
- Tribe: Rhynchodemini
- Genus: Platydemus von Graff, 1896

Type species
- Rhynchodemus grandis Spencer, 1892

= Platydemus =

Genus of flatworms

Platydemus is a genus of large predatory land planarians in the tribe Rhynchodemini.

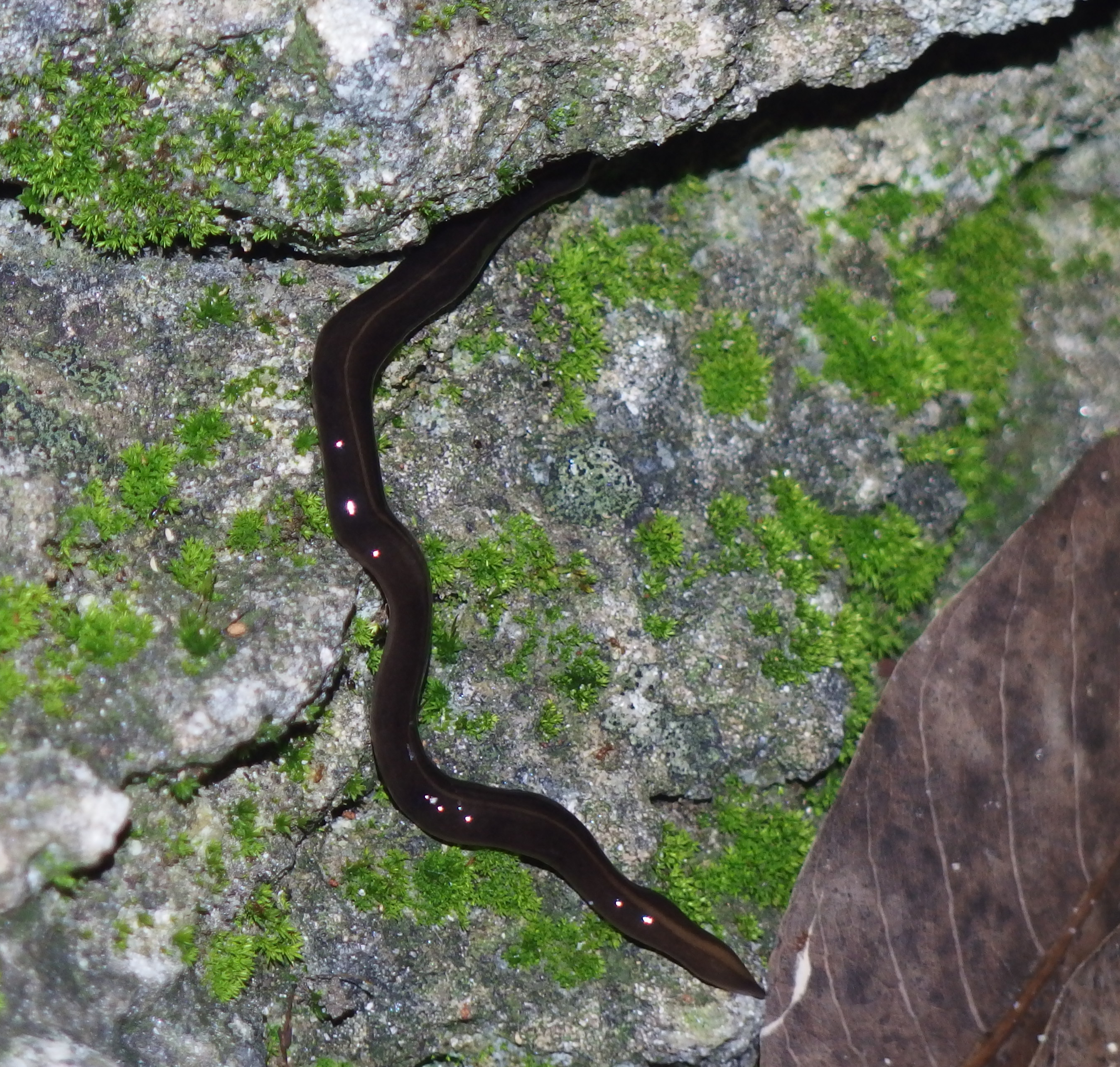
Platydemus manokwari, invasive in Florida, USA

== Description ==
Species of the genus Platydemus are characterized by a massive, slightly convex body with a broad creeping sole and very large eyes. The copulatory apparatus has a large chamber with folded epithelium in the male atrium, usually with a small penis.

== Species ==
The genus Platydemus includes the following species:

- Platydemus bivittatus von Graff, 1899
- Platydemus fasciatus (Spencer, 1892)
- Platydemus grandis (Spencer, 1892)
- Platydemus joliveti de Beauchamp, 1972
- Platydemus lividus von Graff, 1899
- Platydemus longibulbus de Beauchamp, 1972
- Platydemus macrophthalmus von Graff, 1899
- Platydemus manokwari de Beauchamp, 1963 – "New Guinea flatworm"
- Platydemus pindaudei de Beauchamp, 1972
- Platydemus tabatteldii Graff, 1899
- Platydemus vanheurni de Beauchamp, 1929
- Platydemus victoriae (Dendy, 1890)
- Platydemus zimmermanni de Beauchamp, 1952
