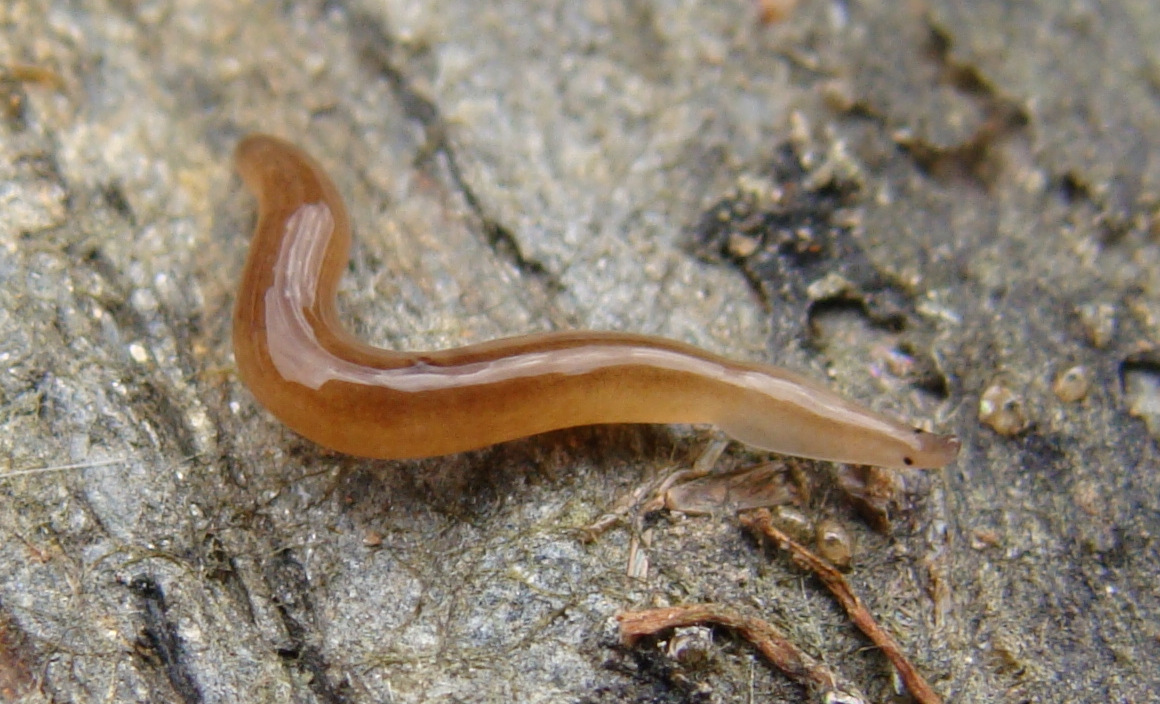
- Rhynchodemus sylvaticus

Scientific classification
- Kingdom: Animalia
- Phylum: Platyhelminthes
- Order: Tricladida
- Family: Geoplanidae
- Tribe: Rhynchodemini
- Genus: Rhynchodemus; Leidy, 1851

Type species
- Planaria sylvatica Leidy, 1851

= Rhynchodemus =

Genus of flatworms

Rhynchodemus is a genus of land planarians in the tribe Rhynchodemini.

== Description ==
Species of the genus Rhynchodemus are characterized by an elongate body that is attenuated at both ends, oval or round in cross section. The creeping sole occupies most of the ventral surface and the anterior end has two large eyes. The copulatory apparatus has a large chamber with folded epithelium in the male atrium, without a penis papilla.

== Species ==
The genus Rhynchodemus includes the following species:

- Rhynchodemus americanus Hyman, 1943
- Rhynchodemus angustus (Hyman, 1941)
- Rhynchodemus aripensis Prudhoe, 1949
- Rhynchodemus blainvillei von Graff, 1899
- Rhynchodemus bromelicola de Beauchamp, 1912
- Rhynchodemus costaricensis de Beauchamp, 1913
- Rhynchodemus flavus Moseley, 1877
- Rhynchodemus fuscus Moseley, 1877
- Rhynchodemus graetzi du Bois-Reymond Marcus, 1953
- Rhynchodemus hectori von Graff, 1897
- Rhynchodemus ijimai Kaburaki, 1922
- Rhynchodemus inopinatus (de Beauchamp, 1930)
- Rhynchodemus marfa Marcus, 1953
- Rhynchodemus misus du Bois-Reymond Marcus, 1965
- Rhynchodemus nematopsis (de Beauchamp, 1930)
- Rhynchodemus oahuensis Hyman, 1939
- Rhynchodemus ochroleucus von Graff, 1899
- Rhynchodemus palnisius de Beauchamp, 1930
- Rhynchodemus piptus Marcus, 1952
- Rhynchodemus samperi Furhmann, 1912
- Rhynchodemus schmardai von Graff, 1899
- Rhynchodemus schubarti du Bois-Reymond Marcus, 1955
- Rhynchodemus scius du Bois-Reymond Marcus, 1955
- Rhynchodemus sumbawaeiensis (Hausler-Gamish, 1982)
- Rhynchodemus sylvaticus (Leidy, 1851)
- Rhynchodemus vejdovskyi von Graff, 1899

== Molecular information ==
The mitochondrial genome of Rhynchodemus sylvaticus was described in 2025. It is 16,891 bp long and contains 12 protein-coding genes, two rRNA genes and 21 tRNA genes; no tRNA-Thr was found. In contrast to the other eight species of Rhynchodeminae with sequenced mitogenomes, there is a real stop codon for ND5. In a phylogeny based on proteins from the mitogenome, R. sylvaticus is within a clade including other species of the tribe Rhynchodemini from Oceania, but is distinguished by a long branch.
