= Paul Marais de Beauchamp =

French zoologist (1883–1977)

- Born: Charles Alfred Paul Marais de Beauchamp; 3 March 1883; Paris
- Died: 30 January 1977 (aged 93); Paris
- Education: University of Paris
- Awards: Cuvier Prize (1935)
- Scientific career
- Fields: Zoology, Helminthology
- Workplaces: University of Strasbourg
- Author abbrev. (zoology): Beauchamp

Charles Alfred Paul Marais de Beauchamp (3 March 1883 – 30 January 1977), 5th Baron Soye, was a French zoologist.

== Life ==
Paul Marais de Beauchamp was born in 1883 in Paris as the first son of Etienne Arthur Marais de Beauchamp, office manager of the Ministry of Public Instruction and Fine Arts, and Elisabeth Nicard, granddaughter of Jean Louis Soye, 1st Baron Soye.

In 1950, he was president of the Zoological Society of France.

== Work ==
Beauchamp specialized in the study of rotifers and turbellarians.

=== Selected works ===
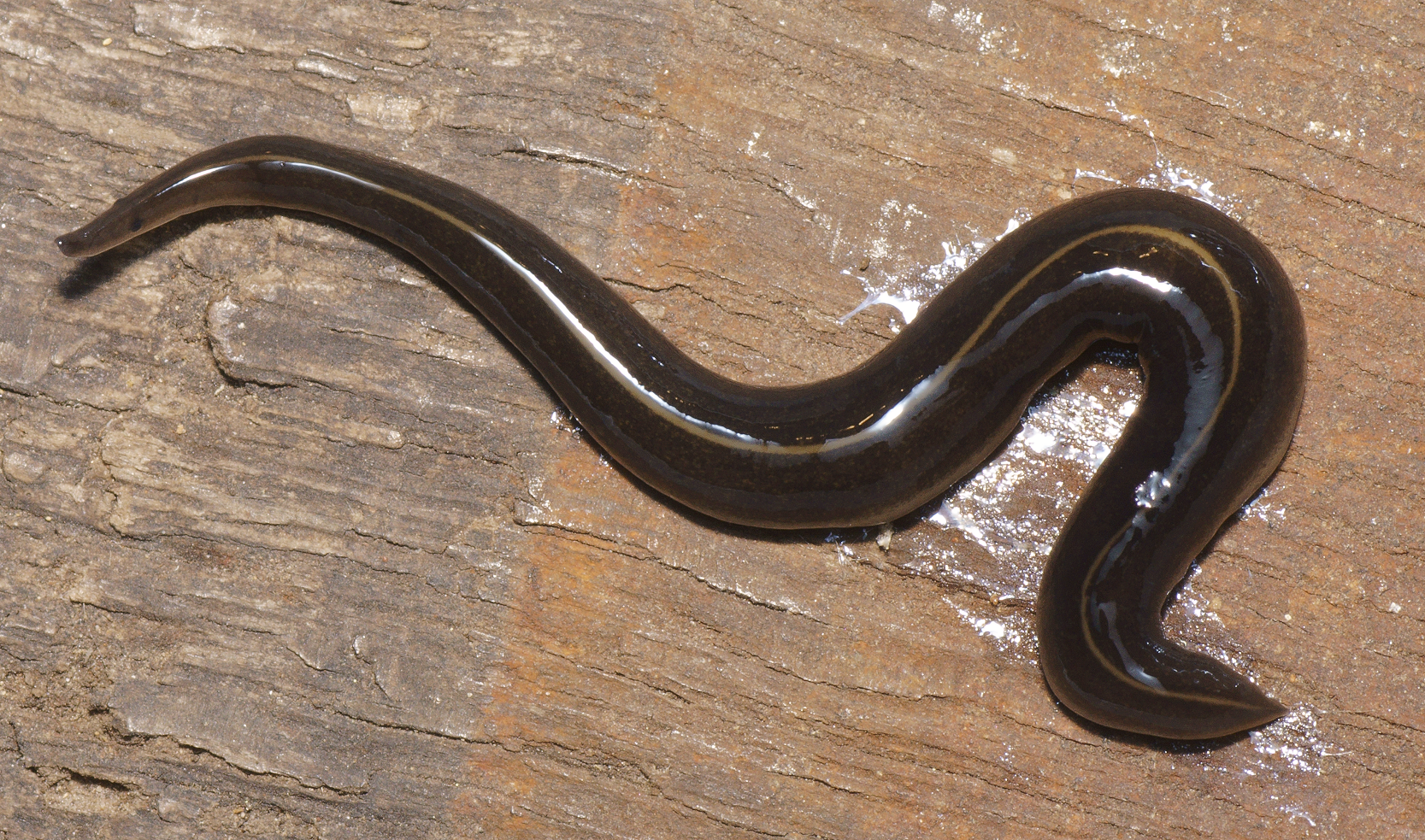
Platydemus manokwari, a flatworm species described by Beauchamp

- Beauchamp, P (1905). "Études sur les cestodes des sélaciens". Archives de Parasitologie. 9: 463–539.
- Beauchamp, P (1907). "Seconde liste de Rotifères observés en France". Bulletin de la Société Zoologique de France. 32: 143–148. doi:10.5962/bhl.part.16421. ISSN 0037-962X.
- Beauchamp, P (1910). "Archiloa riyularis n. g. n. sp. Turbellarie alloeocoele d'eau douce". Bulletin de la Société Zoologique de France. 35: 211–219. doi:10.5962/bhl.part.16421. ISSN 0037-962X.
- Beauchamp, P. (1912). "Planaires Terrestres des Broméliacées de Costa-Rica Recueillies par M. C. Picado". Archives de Zoologie Expérimentale et Genérale. 10 (1): 1–10.
- Beauchamp, P. (1912). "Instructions for collecting and fixing rotifers in bulk". Proceedings of the United States National Museum. 42 (1893): 181–185. doi:10.5479/si.00963801.1893.181. hdl:2027/hvd.32044107345993. ISSN 0096-3801.
- Beauchamp, P. (1925). "Quelques triclades terrestres de Bornéo". Archives de Zoologie Expérimentale et Genérale. 64 (3): 63–70.
- Beauchamp, P. (1939). "V. Rotifères et Turbellariés". Transactions of the Linnean Society of London. 3rd Series. 1 (1): 51–79. doi:10.1111/j.1096-3642.1939.tb00005.x. ISSN 1945-9467.

== Homages ==
The genus of freshwater planarians Debeauchampia (currently a synonym of Procerodes) and the genus of land planarians Beauchampius were named after him.
