= Cotyloplana =

Scientific classification
- Domain: Eukaryota
- Kingdom: Animalia
- Phylum: Platyhelminthes
- Order: Tricladida
- Family: Geoplanidae
- Tribe: Rhynchodemini
- Genus: Cotyloplana; Spencer, 1892

Type species
- Cotyloplana punctata Spencer, 1892

Genus of flatworms

Cotyloplana is a genus of land planarians in the tribe Rhynchodemini.

== Description ==
The genus Cotyloplana is characterized by a flat body with a wide creeping sole. There is one sucker located ventrally at the anterior end, in front of the creeping sole. The copulatory apparatus has a large spacious male atrium, with a small and obtuse penis papilla. A diverticulum opens into the common atrium from its posterior wall.

== Species ==
The genus Cotyloplana currently contains two species:

- Cotyloplana borneensis de Beauchamp, 1933
- Cotyloplana pilcata Whitehouse, 1914
- Cotyloplana punctata Spencer, 1892
