= Pelmatoplaninini =

Scientific classification
- Kingdom: Animalia
- Phylum: Platyhelminthes
- Order: Tricladida
- Family: Geoplanidae
- Subfamily: Rhynchodeminae
- Tribe: Pelmatoplaninini; Ogren & Kawakatsu, 1991

Genera
- See text.

Synonyms
- Pelmatoplaninae Ogren and Kawakatsu, 1991

Tribe of flatworms

Pelmatoplaninini is a tribe of land planarians in the subfamily Rhynchodeminae.

== Description ==
The tribe Pelmatoplaninini is defined as containing land planarians with a narrow body with tapered anterior end. The eyes are numerous and clustered along the sides of the body on the anterior half, usually not extending behind the mouth. The pharynx in cylindrical and the creeping sole is narrow, occupying less than 25% of the ventral side. The cutaneous longitudinal muscles are very weak, not forming bundles. The parenchymal longitudinal musculature is very strong and forms an annular ring zone around the intestine. The copulatory apparatus has a well-developed penis papilla.

== Genera ==
The tribe Pelmatoplaninini contains only two genera:

- Beauchampius Ogren & Kawakatsu, 1991
- Pelmatoplana Graff, 1896
