= Beauchampius =

Scientific classification
- Kingdom: Animalia
- Phylum: Platyhelminthes
- Order: Tricladida
- Family: Geoplanidae
- Tribe: Pelmatoplaninini
- Genus: Beauchampius; Ogren & Kawakatsu, 1991

Type species
- Pelmatoplana trimeni Graff, 1899

Genus of flatworms

Beauchampius is a genus of land planarians in the tribe Pelmatoplaninini.

== Description ==
The genus Beauchampius includes planarians with weak cutaneous longitudinal musculature and strong parenchymal musculature forming a ring zone. The copulatory apparatus has a well-developed conical penis papilla and two female ducts opening into the genital atrium, one from the ventral female canal and other from the dorsal diverticulum that in some cases forms a seminal bursa.

== Etymology ==
The genus Beauchampius was named in honor of Paul Marais de Beauchamp, who studied land planarians for more than 60 years.

== Species ==
The genus Beauchampius includes the following species:

- Beauchampius bangoianus (de Beauchamp, 1939)
- Beauchampius coonoorensis (de Beauchamp, 1930)
- Beauchampius crassus (de Beauchamp, 1939)
- Beauchampius dawydoffi (de Beauchamp, 1939)
- Beauchampius indosinicus (de Beauchamp, 1939)
- Beauchampius nilgiriensis (Whitehouse, 1919)
- Beauchampius sarasinorum (Graff, 1899)
- Beauchampius sondaica (Loman, 1890)
- Beauchampius trimeni (Graff, 1899)
