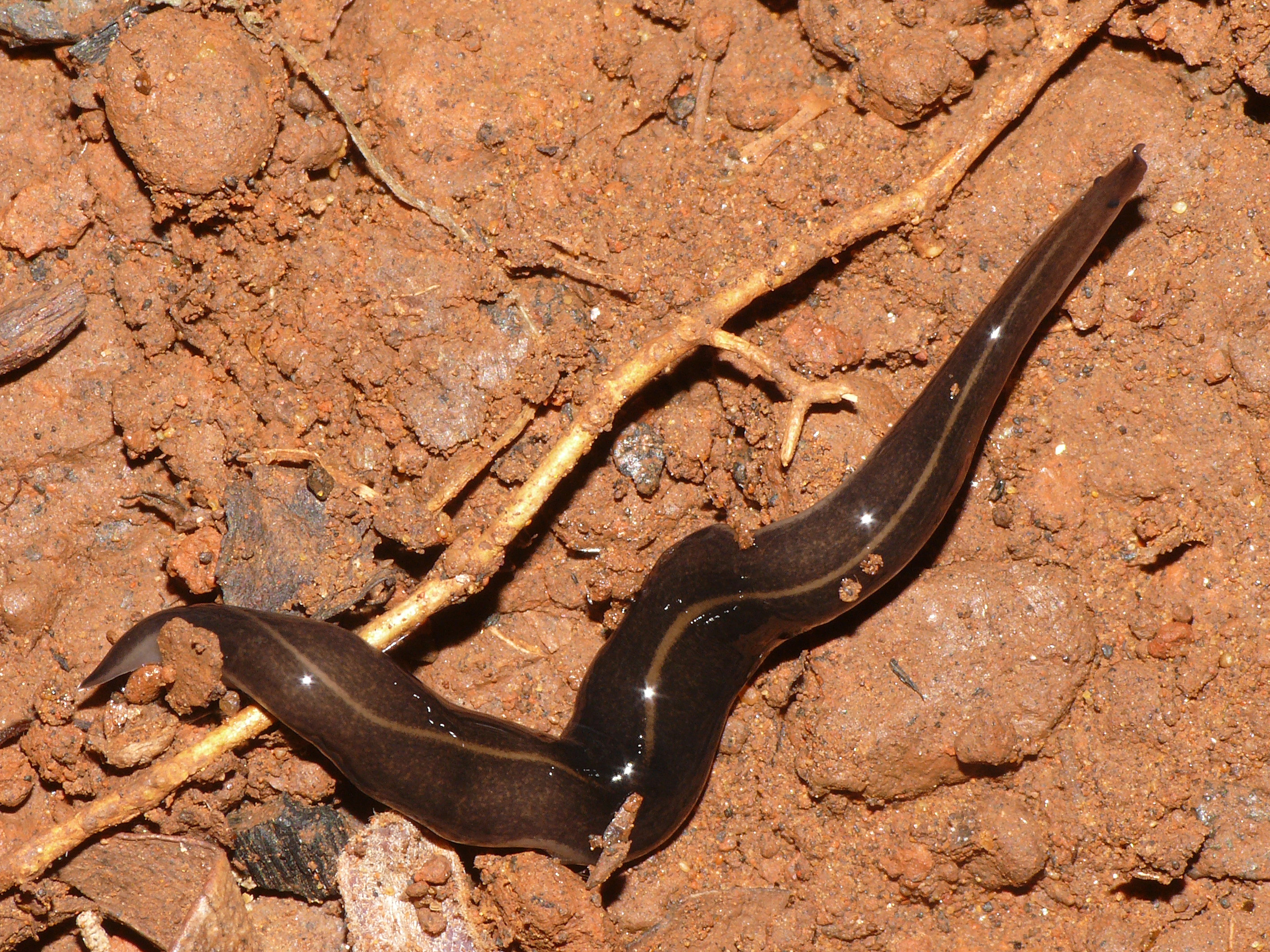
- Head is on the right.

Scientific classification
- Kingdom: Animalia
- Phylum: Platyhelminthes
- Order: Tricladida
- Family: Geoplanidae
- Genus: Platydemus
- Species: P. manokwari

Binomial name
- Platydemus manokwari De Beauchamp, 1963
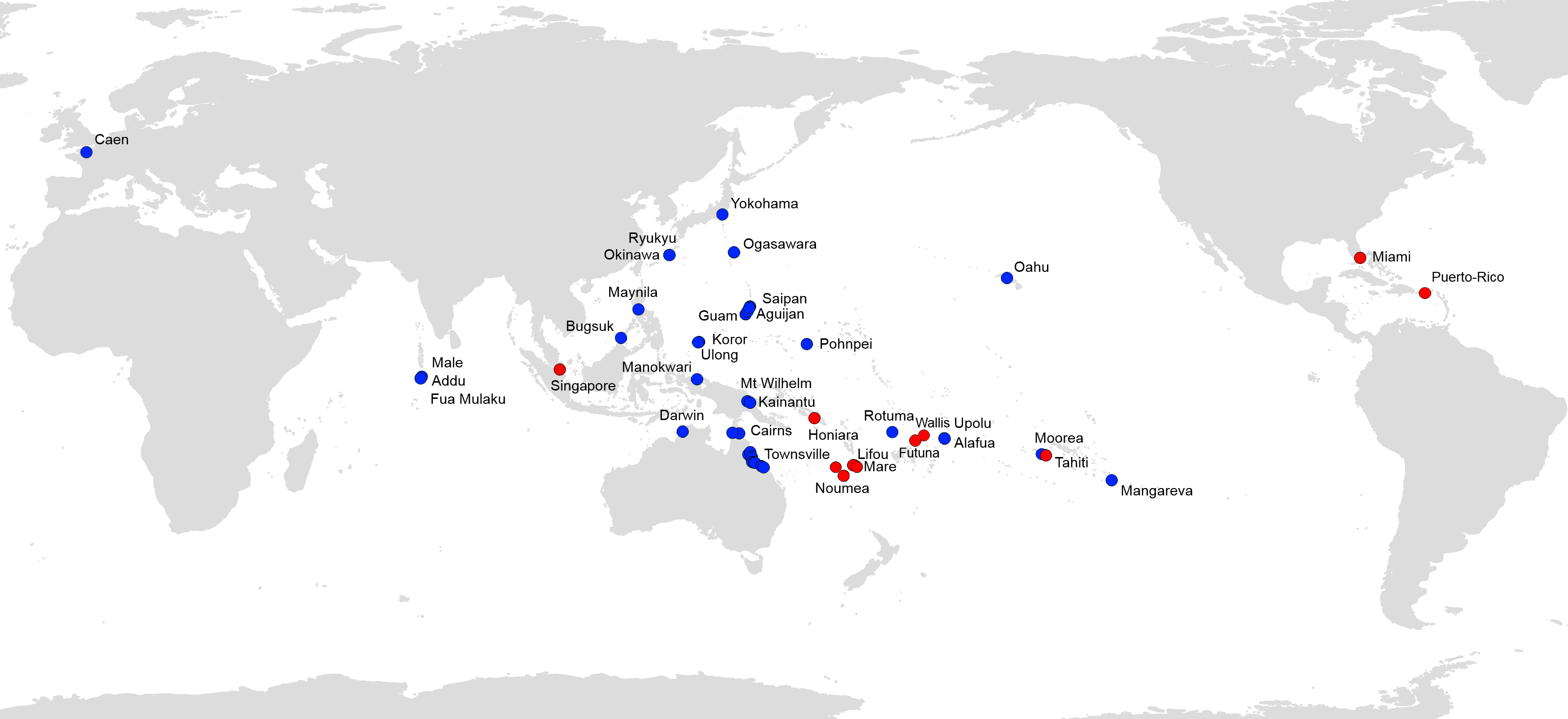

= Platydemus manokwari =

Species of flatworm

Platydemus manokwari, also known as the New Guinea flatworm, is a species of large predatory land flatworm.

Native to New Guinea, it has been accidentally introduced to the soil of many countries, including the United States. It was also deliberately introduced into two Pacific islands in an attempt to control an invasion of the giant African land snail. It eats a variety of invertebrates including land snails, and has had a significant negative impact on the rare endemic land snail fauna of some Pacific islands. It has become established in a wide variety of habitats.

== Distribution and habitat ==
P. manokwari is native to the island of New Guinea in the Pacific Ocean. This species of large flatworm preys on land mollusks and has been categorized as one of the 100 worst invasive species.

The original habitat of P. manokwari is within tropical areas, but it has been found in almost all temperate regions of the world including in agricultural, coastland, and disturbed areas, as well as, natural forests, planted forests, riparian zones, scrub/shrublands, urban areas, and wetlands. However, P. manokwari does not live in urban coastal areas, perhaps due to environmental factors, such as lack of vegetation.

== Description ==
It is relatively large, about 40–65 millimetres (1.6–2.6 inches) in length and about 4–7 millimetres (0.16–0.28 inches) wide. Its body, however, is quite flat, being less than 2 millimetres (0.08 inches) in thickness. Both ends of the animal are pointed, but the head end is more pointed than the tail end. Near the tip of the head end are two eyes. It is dark brown on the upper surface, with a lighter central line. The underside is pale grey.

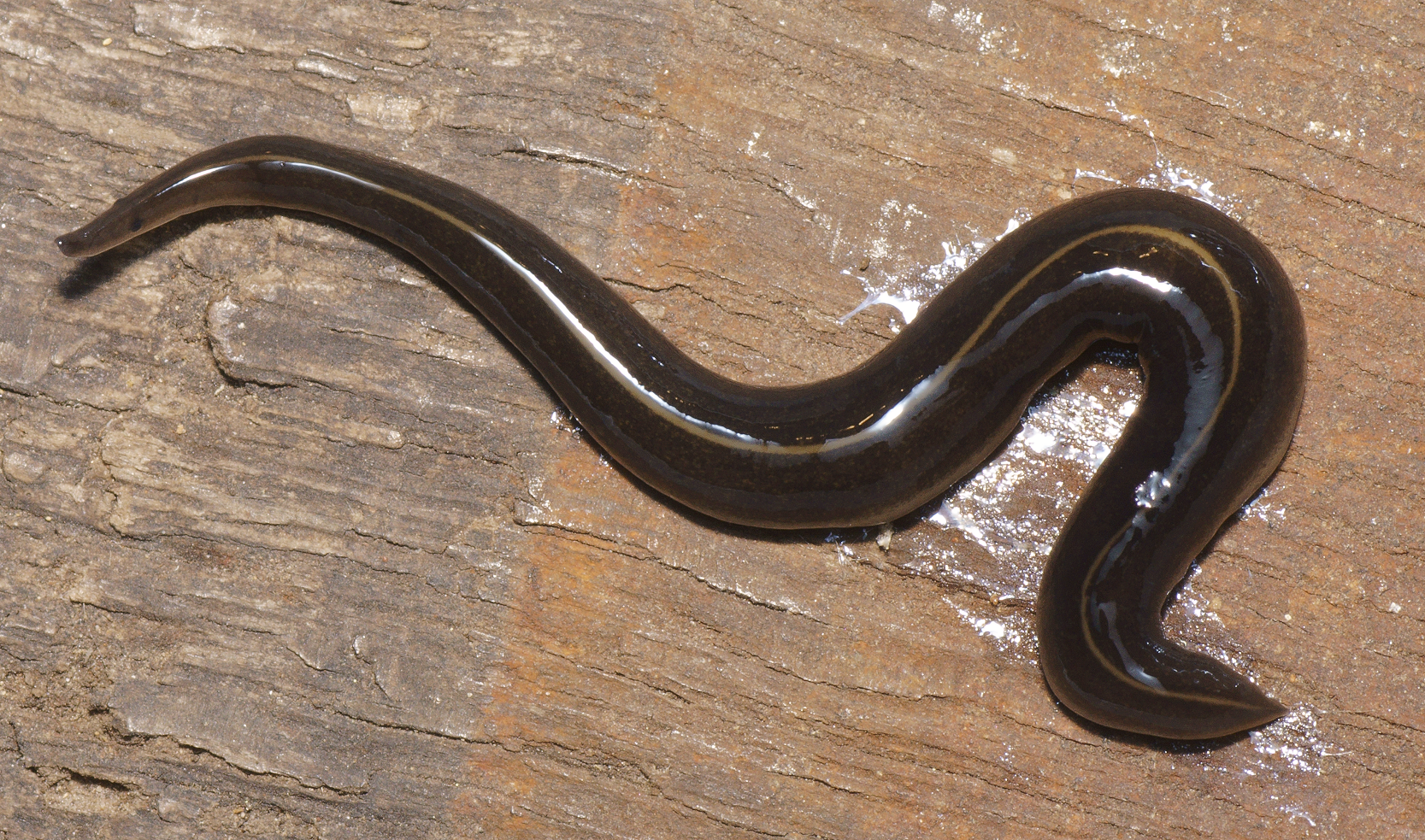
Dorsal view, in France

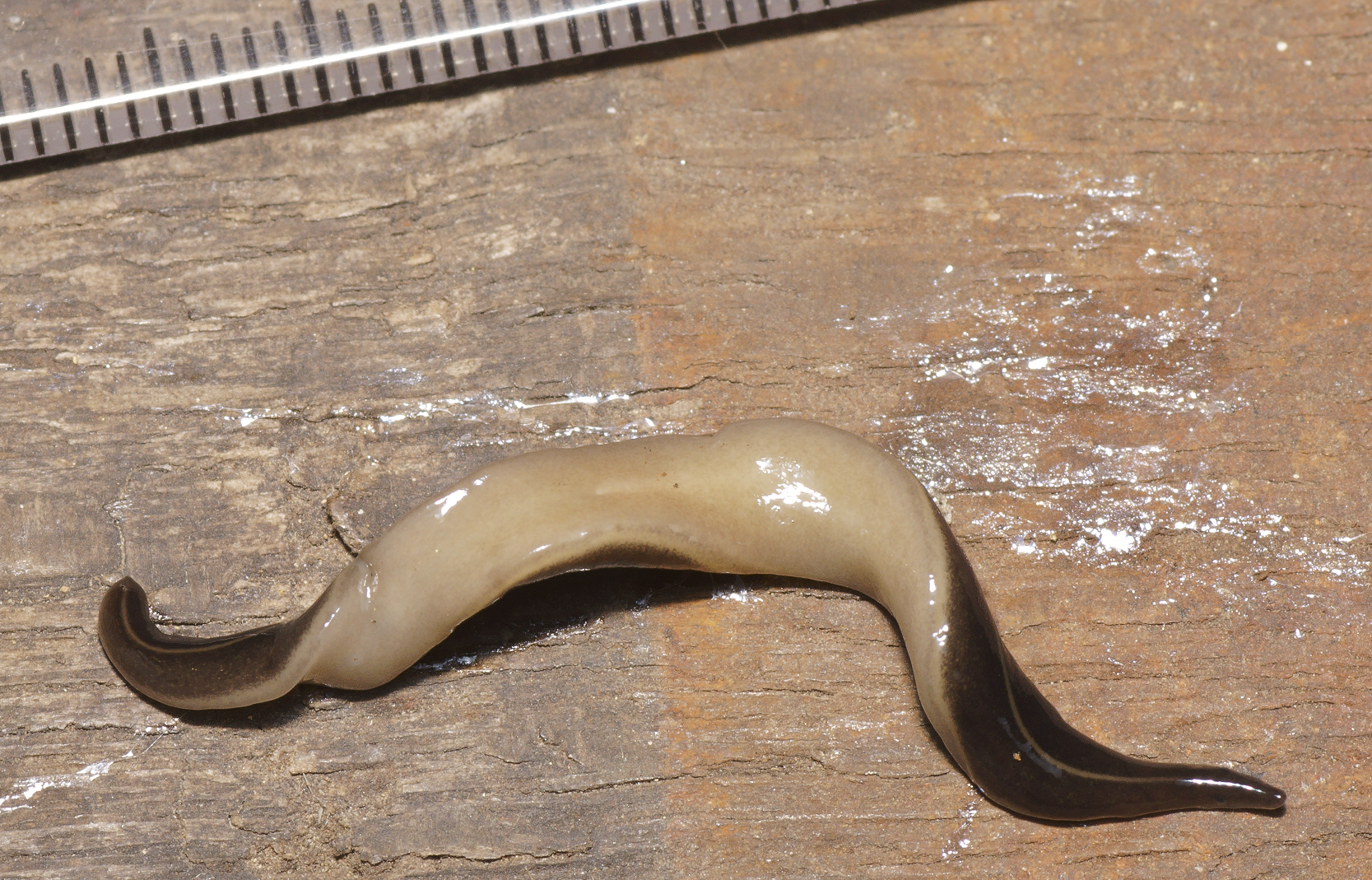
The ventral side is pale finely mottled light brown.

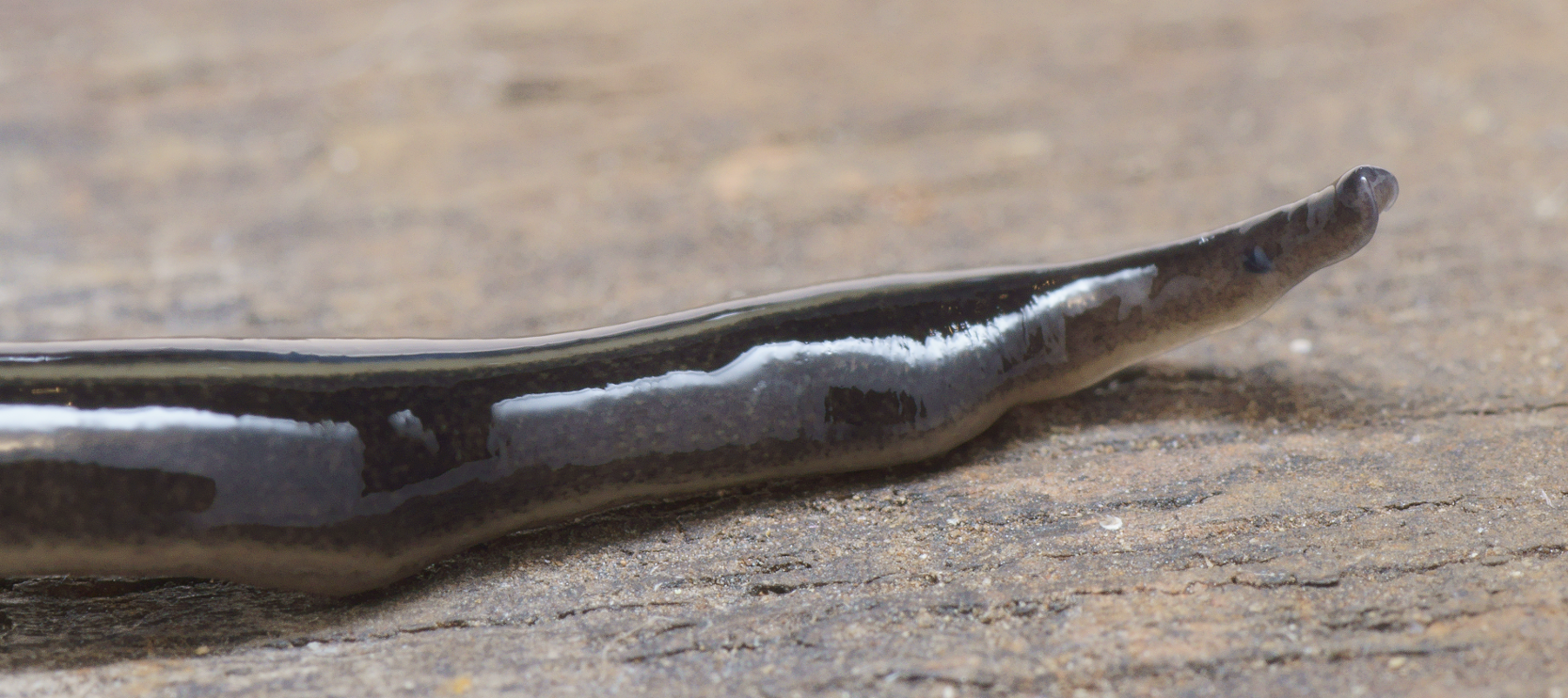
Head region

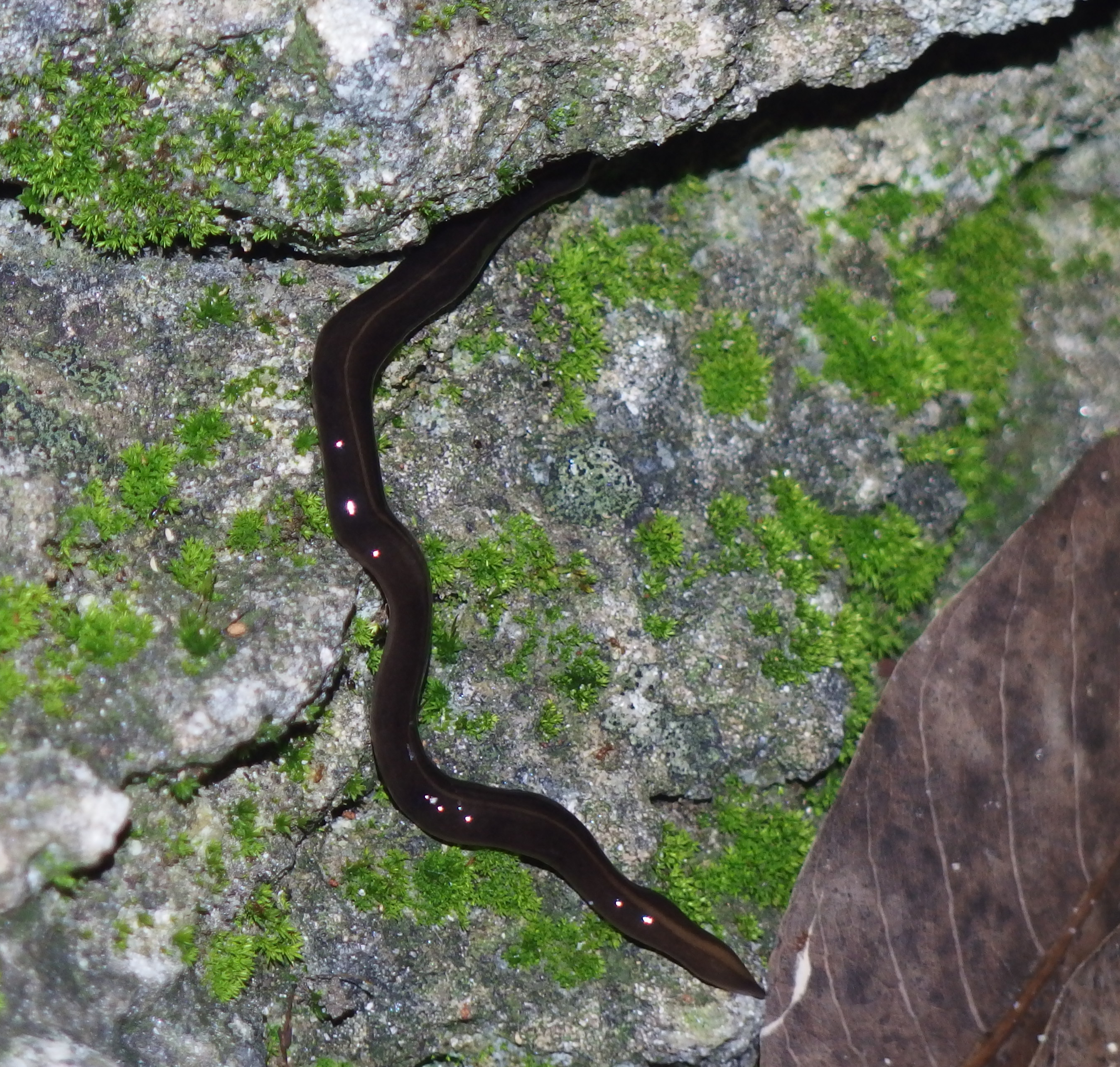
In Florida

== Ecology ==
=== Diet ===
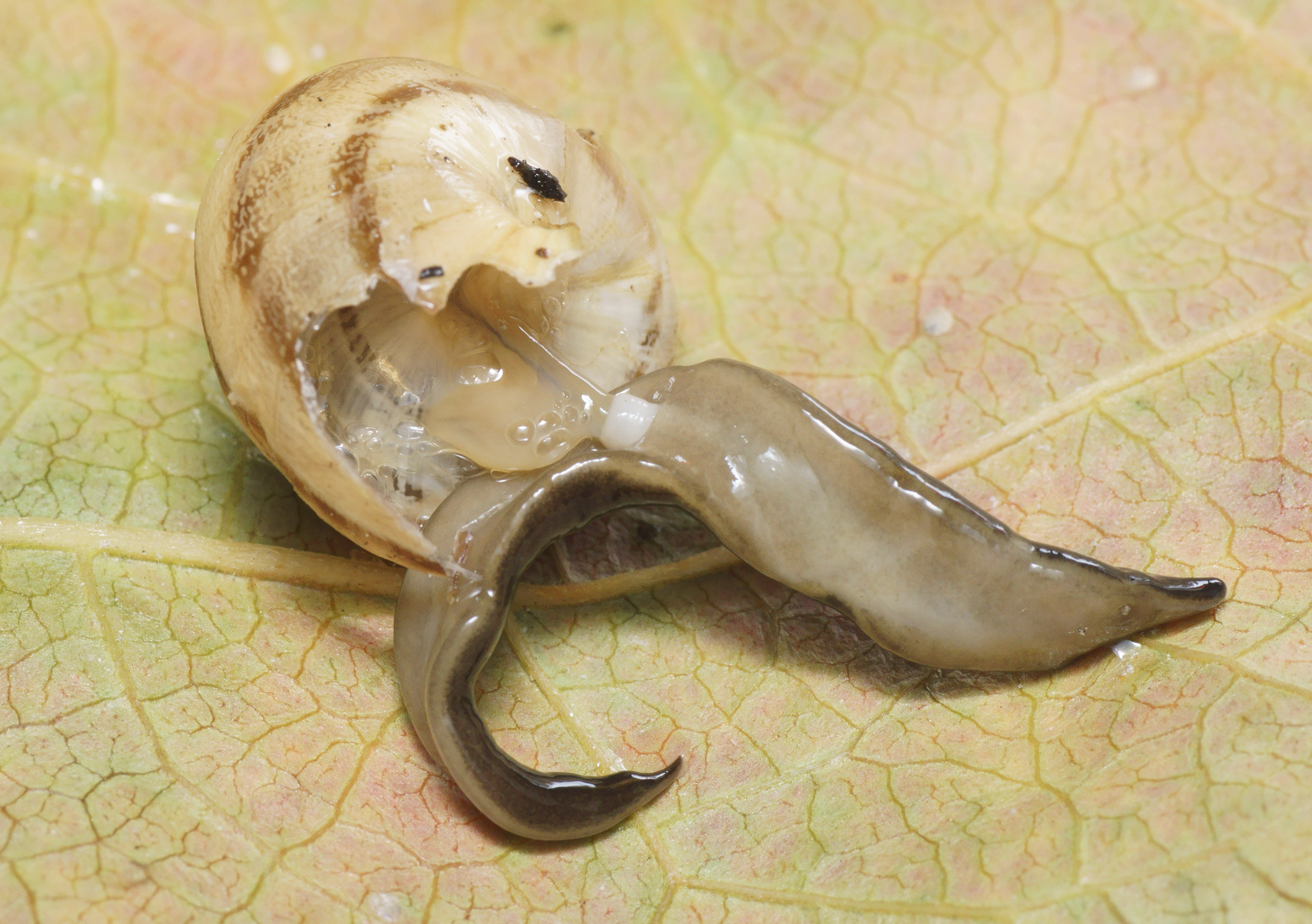
P. manokwari feeding on the snail Eobania vermiculata, using the white cylindrical pharynx visible on the ventral side.

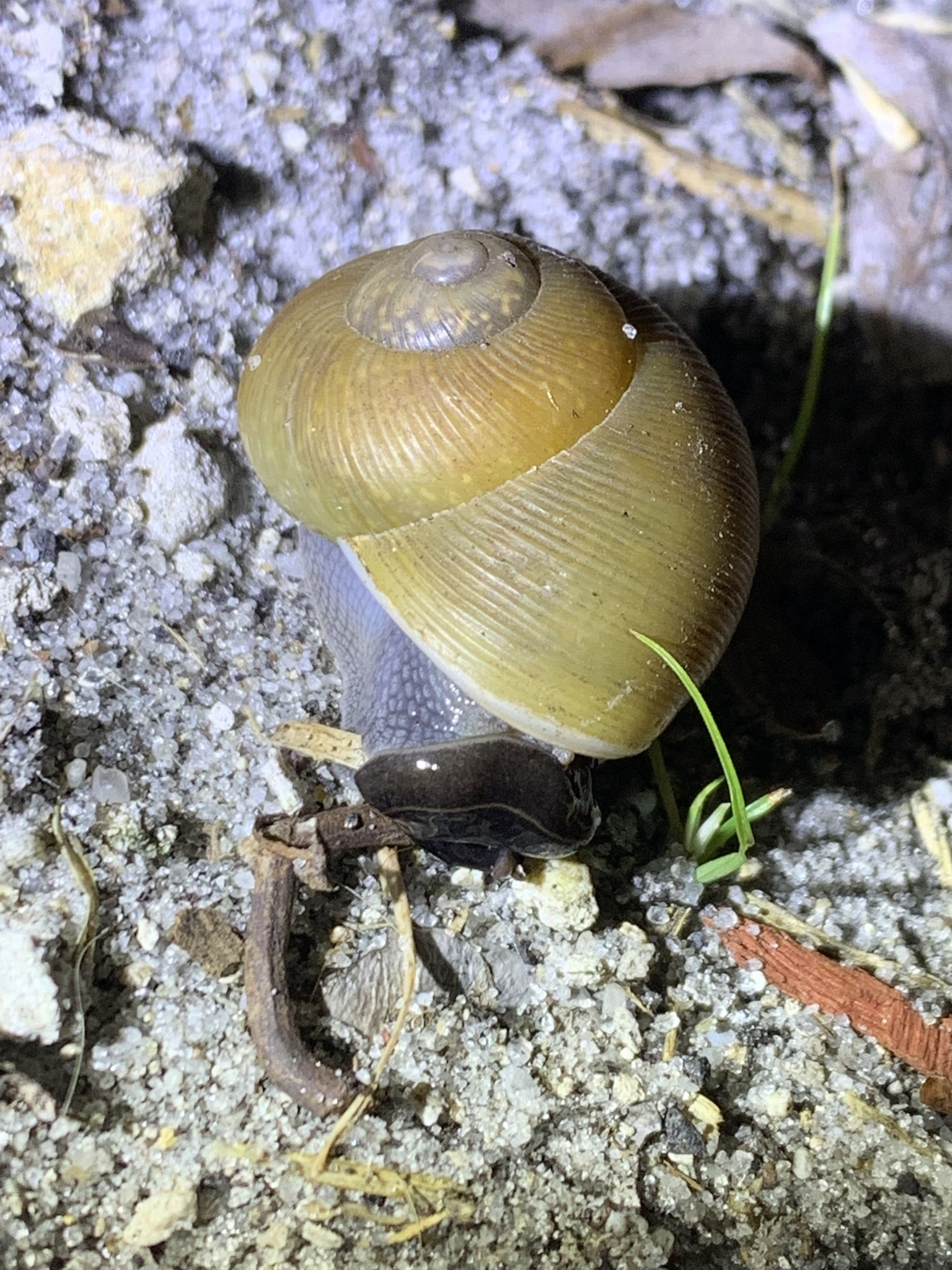
Feeding on a Cuban brown snail, in Florida

P. manokwari mainly preys on small land snails, but it has been known to feed on various soil invertebrates, such as earthworms, slugs, and arthropods. Platydemus manokwari is the main predator of land mollusks, and preys upon the snails during most of their life cycle including young hatchlings. Furthermore, P. manokwari does not recognize early-stage snail eggs as a possible food source, but it does feed on young hatchlings and late-stage eggs of land snails. Platydemus manokwari uses a chemical-based tracking method to follow snail mucus trails and track down its prey, sometimes even into trees. In areas where the land snail population has been exhausted, it has been known to eat other flatworms. The diet of Platydemus manokwari is also affected seasonally. According to studies done by Sugiura, more than 90% of the land snails were preyed upon by P. manokwari in the period from July to November, and only 40% of the land snails were eaten during the other months. It was thus found that there was a positive correlation between snail mortality and temperature. This seasonal difference can be explained by different foraging behaviors, different microclimatic conditions, and different densities.

A rare observation of Platydemus manokwari scavenging on a dead human body was reported in 2024 in Australia. Several flatworms were attached to the body and were associated with areas of skin loss.

=== Predators ===
There are no known predators of P. manokwari. However, it is a paratenic host for the nematode Angiostrongylus cantonensis, also known as the rat lungworm. This nematode parasitizes P. manokwari as well as the giant African land snail, and both of these organisms are transmission vectors of the parasite. A. cantonensis parasitizes humans as well and causes angiostrongyliasis. P. manokwari is presumed to act as a transmission vector of the parasite to humans and affects the epidemiology of angiostrongyliasis. In an outbreak of angiostrongyliasis in the Okinawa Prefecture, populations of Angiostrongylasis cantonensis intermediates were examined in order to find the most frequently infected intermediates. P. manokwari was found to be one of the prevailing infected hosts, with an infection rate of 14.1%. It is possible that Platydemus manokwari is a vector because it has been occasionally found underside cabbage leaves which would be eaten raw as fresh salad.

== Invasive species characteristics ==
Platydemus manokwari has been introduced to several tropical and subtropical islands such as Micronesia, the Marquesas, the Society Islands, Samoa, Melanesia, and the Hawaiian Islands. Although most of these introductions were accidental, it was also deliberately introduced into two Pacific islands to control an invasion of the Giant East African Snail. These islands often harbor endemic radiations of rare and endangered snail species, which are a primary source of nutrition for Platydemus manokwari. Platydemus manokwari has also been introduced to several Japanese Islands. In 2015, P. manokwari was found in Puerto Rico and in Florida, from which it could further invade the mainland southern US. In 2021, it was reported from the French islands of Guadeloupe, Martinique and Saint Martin in the Antilles. In 2023, it was reported in Brisbane, Australia, the southernmost location to this date.

There are several methods by which P. manokwari has been introduced to these areas. Some methods are accidental. One such is the sale of tropical plants and potting soil that contains P. manokwari. Another method of accidental introduction occurs through the movement of machinery and equipment. P. manokwari are often found in the leftover soil on the construction equipment and when the soil is transferred, P. manokwari is also transported. P. manokwari can also be transferred to new areas through the accidental transfer of seed material used to restore vegetation.

P. manokwari has also sometimes been introduced intentionally, as a biological control agent. In various areas such as Guam and the Okinawa islands, P. manokwari was introduced to control the population of the invasive Giant African land snail, which had damaged crops and threatened the agricultural industry. It has been said that "much of the 'evidence' that these predators can control Achatina fulica populations is based on a poor understanding of ecological principles. That the predators will prey on [Giant African land snail] is not evidence that they can control its populations...". The flatworm controlled the population of the Giant African land snail but it also began preying on populations of endemic land snail, which led to an unprecedented increase in the P. manokwari populations and a marked decrease in the endemic land snail populations.

=== Ecological effects of invasion ===
Platydemus manokwari has had several effects on the ecology of the communities that it has been introduced to. In the Pacific Islands that P. manokwari has invaded, several native land snails, specifically the Partula, Mandarina, juvenile M. aureola, B. similaris, Allopeas kyotoense, and Meghimatium bilineatum have either gone extinct or their numbers have drastically reduced. P. manokwari is such an efficient and invasive species that it has caused the decline and extinction of gastropods in several islands and is known as one of the '100 world's worst invaders'.

The success of P. manokwari as an invasive species can be attributed to several factors. One explanation is that P. manokwari has very few, if any, known predators and thus has few biotic limiting factors. Also, P. manokwari exhibits high tolerance for several environments. However, P. manokwari cannot survive in colder environments. P. manokwari has also shown versatility in prey tracking and attack methods of snail species. Experiments conducted by Yamaura and Sugiura indicated that P. manokwari can climb trees and track down nonmarine mollusks using olfactory cues.

Experiments have shown that out of five other flatworm species, P. manokwari was by far the most efficient. In an experiment done by Isamu Okochi and colleagues, 5 different flatworm species (including P. manokwari) were kept in various storage units containing endemic snail species. Out of these five species, P. manokwari was the only species that had started to prey on the snail species within a day of introduction. Two of the other predatory flatworm species did prey on the snails, but their rates of predation were not consistent. This indicates that P. manokwari outcompetes other predatory flatworm species and consumes more endemic land species than other species. Furthermore, these data indicate that P. manokwari can begin consuming endemic land snails right after introduction. In other words, P. manokwari can adjust to a new environment fairly quickly and can even destroy fragile ecosystems quickly.

=== Control methods ===
Currently, there are no known methods for controlling the population of P. manokwari. This makes the eradication of the invasive species especially difficult. However, in several other cases, modified versions of parasites and viruses have been used as a biological control agent for invasive species.

Several scientists have theorized that one of the few limiting factors that prevents the expansion of P. manokwari is low tolerance to colder temperatures. P. manokwari thrive best in habitats that range of 18 to 28 °C, which is commonly found in many tropical and subtropical islands. In an experiment done by Shinji Sugiura, P. manokwari were placed in several containers that had a certain amount of land snails in each and allowed to interact with them for a period of fourteen days in temperatures varying from 10 to 26 °C. Of those in the containers kept at 10 °C, only 23.3% survived all fourteen days and none of them fed on the snails. As temperatures increased, an increase in predation and survival of P. manokwari was observed. This shows that P. manokwari is significantly limited in distribution at lower temperatures, but can often flourish at higher temperatures.

=== Future of the invaded communities ===
The major uncertainty regarding communities invaded by P. manokwari involves the survival of endemic snail populations. According to current data, predation by P. manokwari is the biggest cause of the extinction of several native and introduced gastropods (a class of mollusks that include snails and slugs). These data suggest that the population of endemic land snails that have not already gone extinct is sharply decreasing in the areas the P. manokwari has been introduced. Furthermore, there is little hope for endemic land snail populations in areas inhabited by P. manokwari to recover to their original population size before P. manokwari was introduced. This is because the species is such an efficient and active predator that species that its controls prey populations and prevents them from recovering. Although beneficial for farmers and agriculture of the area, this decrease of snail population is problematic because it can drastically alter the food webs and interactions between endemic organisms in the island, which can then affect the fragile ecosystems of the islands. Thus, it is uncertain how ecosystems will change with persisting predation by P. manokwari.

== Genetics ==
Two haplotypes of the Cytochrome c oxidase subunit I (a mitochondrial gene commonly used for DNA barcoding) sequence have been characterised for P. manokwari: one, named "World haplotype", has been found in France, New Caledonia, French Polynesia, Singapore, Florida and Puerto Rico; and the other, named "Australian haplotype" was found in Australia. The only locality with both haplotypes was in the Solomon Islands. These results suggest that two haplotypes exist in the area of origin of the species, probably Papua New Guinea, but that only one of the two haplotypes (the "World haplotype") has, through human agency, been widely dispersed. The complete mitochondrial genome, 19,959-bp in length, was obtained in 2020; it contains 36 genes and is almost colinear with the mitogenomes of the two other species previously sampled from the Geoplanidae, Bipalium kewense and Obama nungara; however, the mitogenome of Platydemus manokwari has an unusually large Cytochrome c oxidase subunit II gene.

== Image gallery: Platydemus manokwari in various countries ==
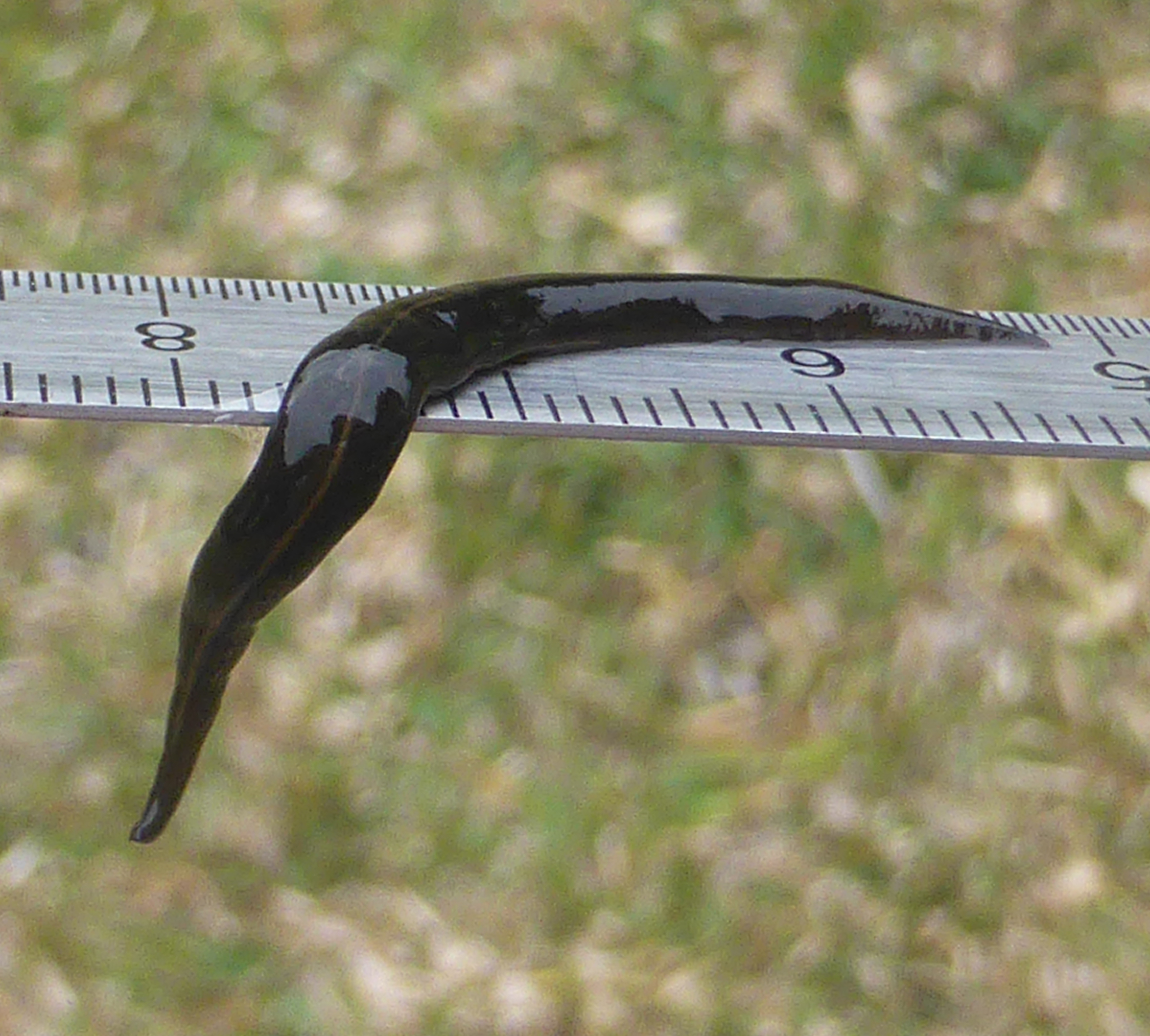
In New Caledonia

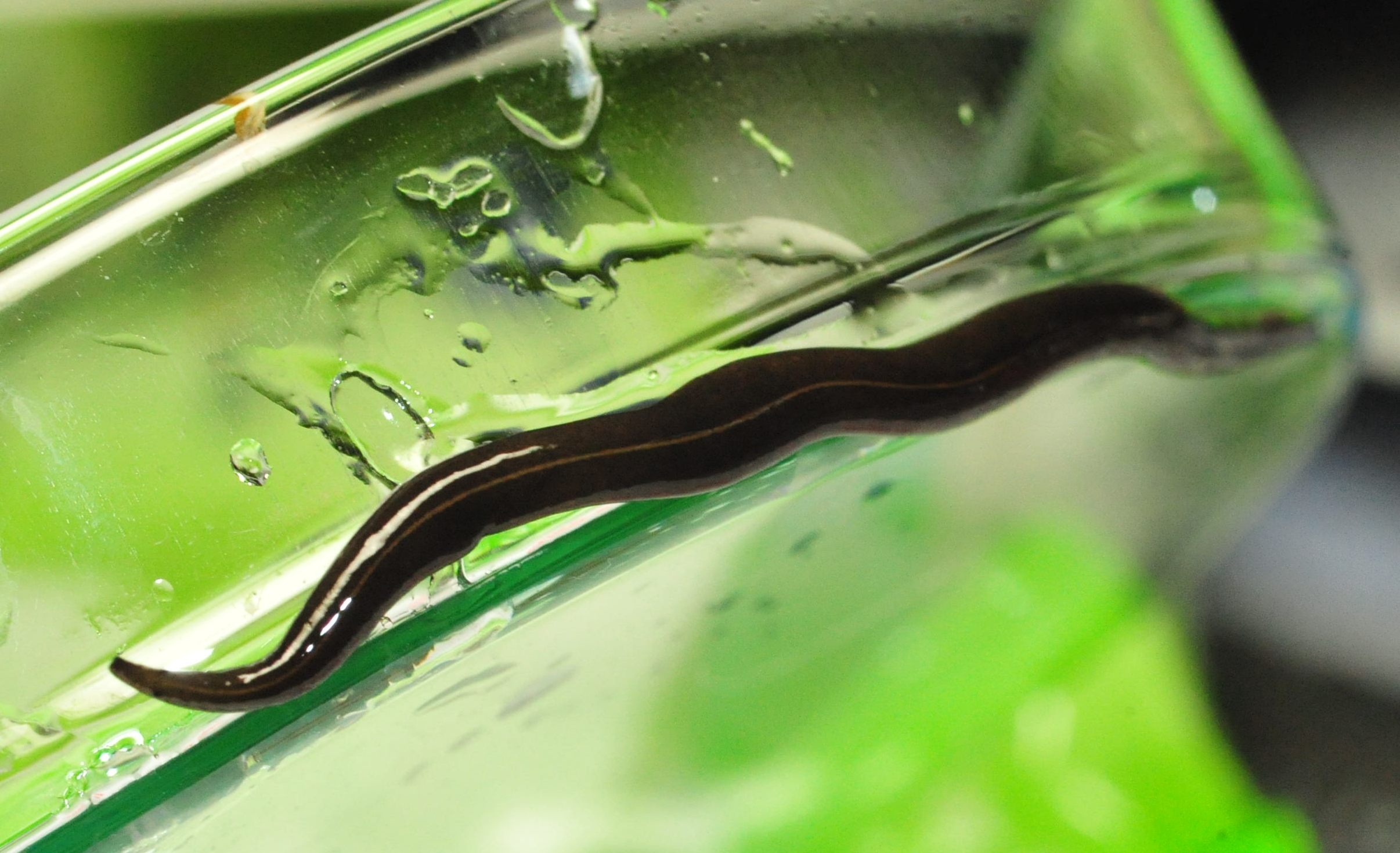
In Singapore

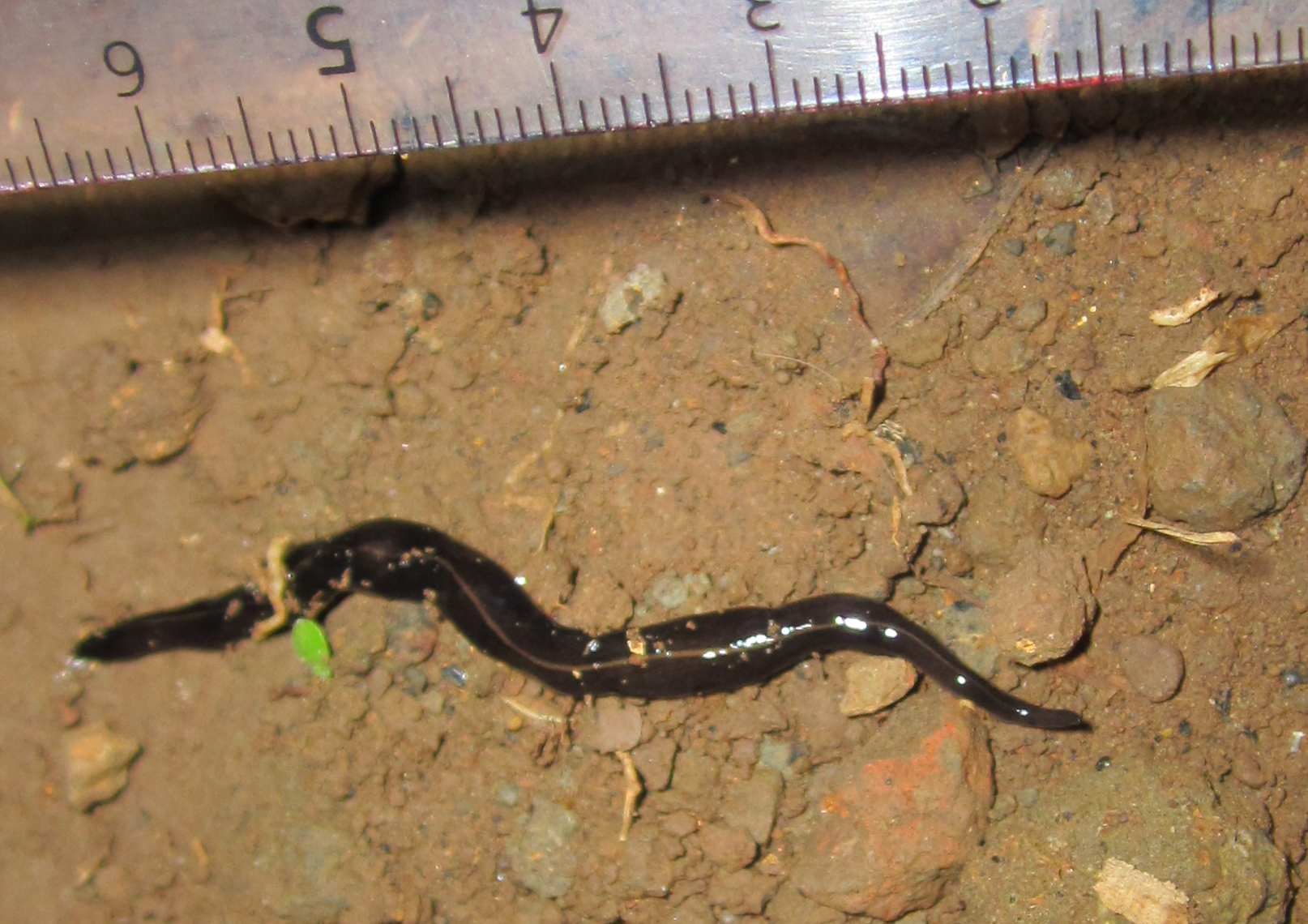
In Tahiti
