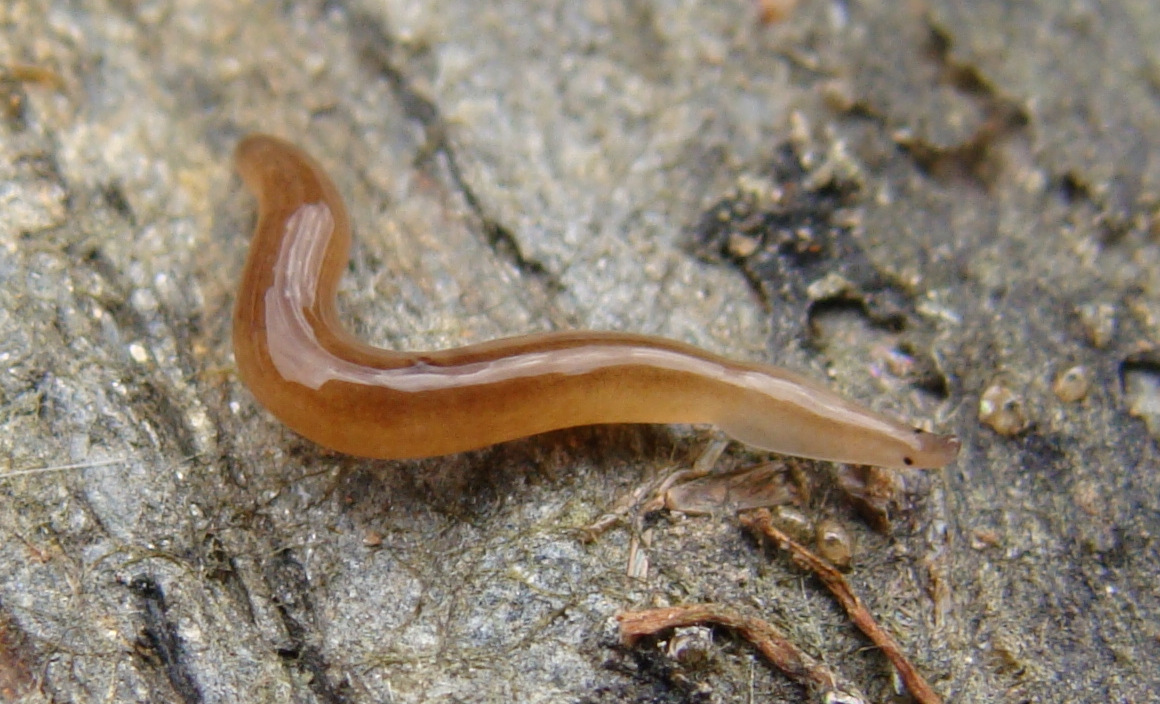
- Rhynchodemus sylvaticus

Scientific classification
- Domain: Eukaryota
- Kingdom: Animalia
- Phylum: Platyhelminthes
- Order: Tricladida
- Family: Geoplanidae
- Subfamily: Rhynchodeminae
- Tribe: Rhynchodemini; Heinzel, 1929

Genera
- See text.

= Rhynchodemini =

Tribe of flatworms

Rhynchodemini is a tribe of land planarians in the subfamily Rhynchodeminae.

== Description ==
The tribe Rhynchodemini is defined as containing land planarians with an elongate, cylindroid form, two eyes near the anterior end and strong subepithelial musculature in which the longitudinal fibers are grouped into large bundles. The copulatory apparatus lacks a penis papilla or has it greatly reduced.

== Genera ==
The tribe Rhynchodemini contains six genera:

- Anisorhynchodemus Kawakatsu, Froehlich, Jones, Ogren & Sasaki, 2003
- Cotyloplana Spencer, 1892
- Digonopyla Fischer, 1926
- Dolichoplana Moseley, 1877
- Platydemus von Graff, 1896
- Rhynchodemus Leidy, 1851
