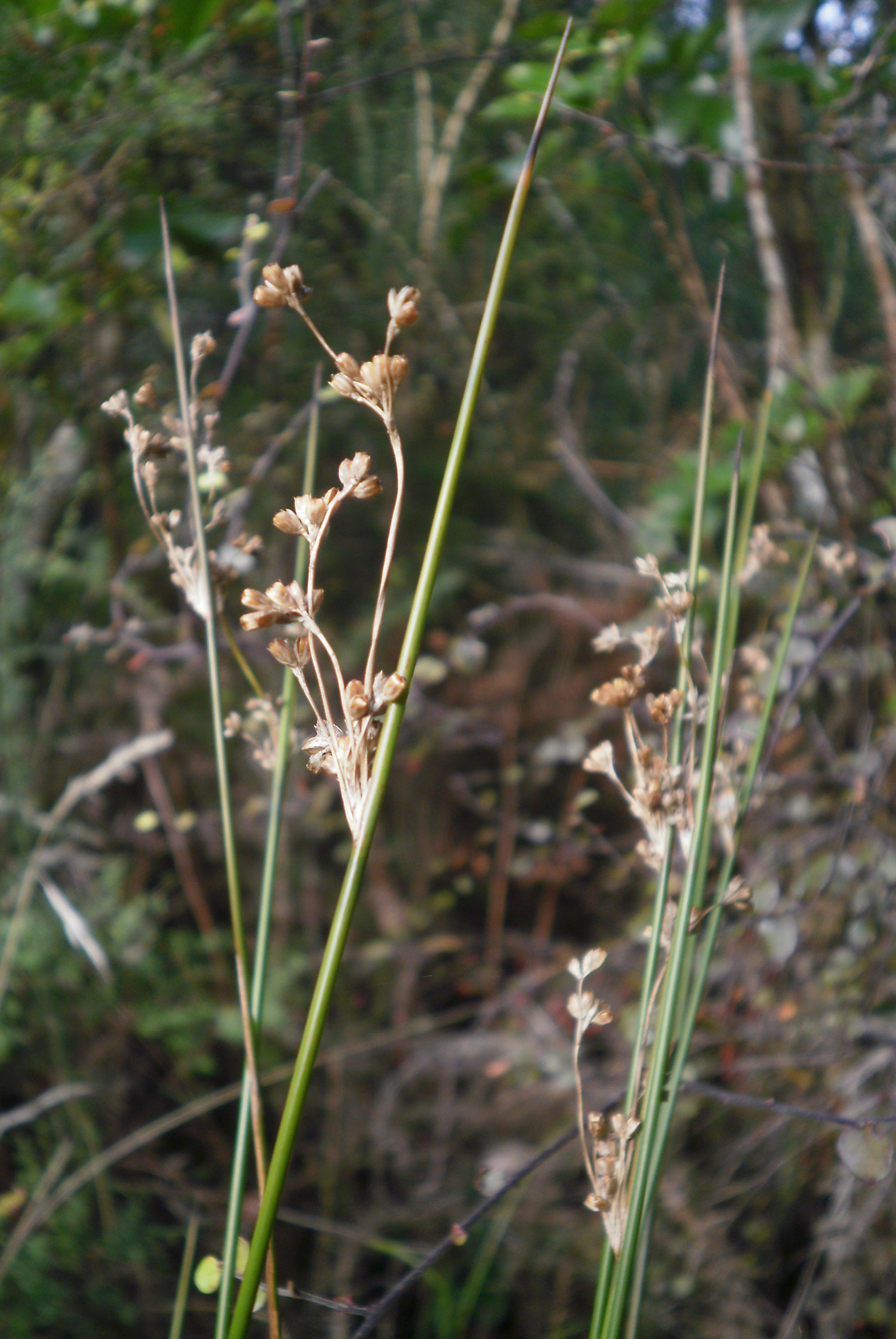

Scientific classification
- Kingdom: Plantae
- Clade: Tracheophytes
- Clade: Angiosperms
- Clade: Monocots
- Clade: Commelinids
- Order: Poales
- Family: Juncaceae
- Genus: Juncus
- Species: J. edgariae

Binomial name
- Juncus edgariae L.A.S.Johnson & K.L.Wilson

= Juncus edgariae =

Species of grass

Juncus edgariae is a species of rush, commonly called Edgar's rush or wīwī, that is endemic to New Zealand.

The species was described in 2001 by Lawrie Johnson and Karen Wilson. It had previously been confused with Juncus gregiflorus, which is now considered endemic to Australia. The species name edgariae is in honour of New Zealand botanist Elizabeth Edgar.

Juncus edgariae is the most abundant rush species in New Zealand, and is widespread throughout, including the Kermadec and Chatham Islands. Found commonly from between the coast to the hills, it is usually located in open shrubland, seasonally wet places or around the edges of wetlands. It has been introduced to Britain.
