= Digonopyla =

Digonopyla harmeri

Scientific classification
- Domain: Eukaryota
- Kingdom: Animalia
- Phylum: Platyhelminthes
- Order: Tricladida
- Family: Geoplanidae
- Genus: Digonopyla; Fischer, 1926
- Species: D. harmeri

Binomial name
- Digonopyla harmeri von Graff, 1899

Synonyms
- Dolichoplana harmeri Graff, 1897

Genus of flatworms

Digonopyla is a monotypic genus of land planarians in the tribe Rhynchodemini. It contains a single species, Digonopyla harmeri.

== Description ==
Digonopyla harmeri is characterized by the presence of numerous pharynges and mouths. The copulatory apparatus has a wall of tissue separating the male and female atria that results in independent male and female openings, an unusual condition in land planarians.
