= Eudoxiatopoplana =

Eudoxiatopoplana bilaticlavia

Scientific classification
- Kingdom: Animalia
- Phylum: Platyhelminthes
- Order: Tricladida
- Family: Geoplanidae
- Subfamily: Rhynchodeminae
- Tribe: Eudoxiaotopoplanini; Winsor, 2009
- Genus: Eudoxiatopoplana; Winsor, 2009
- Species: E. bilaticlavia

Binomial name
- Eudoxiatopoplana bilaticlavia Winsor, 2009

Genus of flatworms

Eudoxiatopoplana is a genus of land planarians from New Zealand, currently comprising a single species, Eudoxiatopoplana bilaticlavia, that occurs in Stewart Island. It is the sole genus of the tribe Eudoxiaotopoplanini.

== Description ==
The genus Eudoxiatopoplana includes land planarians with a small and robust body that is subcylindrical in cross section. The anterior end is blunt and slightly rolled upwards, showing some of the anterior ventral surface and forming a type of adhesive cup. The eyes form multiple rows around the anterior end and dorso-anteriorly and occur along the whole body. The parenchymal longitudinal musculature forms a massive ring zone around the intestine. The testes are dorsal and extend from behind the ovaries to the posterior end. The copulatory apparatus has an inverted penis, a resorptive bursa, and an adenodactyl.

Eudoxiatopoplana bilaticlavia is dorsally a cream color with two broad, mediolateral stripes of a dark greyish-brown with a narrow stripe of cream separating the two. The stripes are darker along the median and lateral edge. The ventral surface is white.

== Etymology ==
The name Eudoxiatopoplana comes is a combination of Greek εὐδοξία (eudoxia), honor + ἄτοπος (atopos), out of place + Latin plana, flat. It honors Professor Eudóxia Maria Froehlich for her contribution to the study of land planarians. The specific epithet bilaticlavia comes from Latin bi-, two + laticlavia, having a broad stripe, and alludes to the two broad dorsal stripes present on this species.
