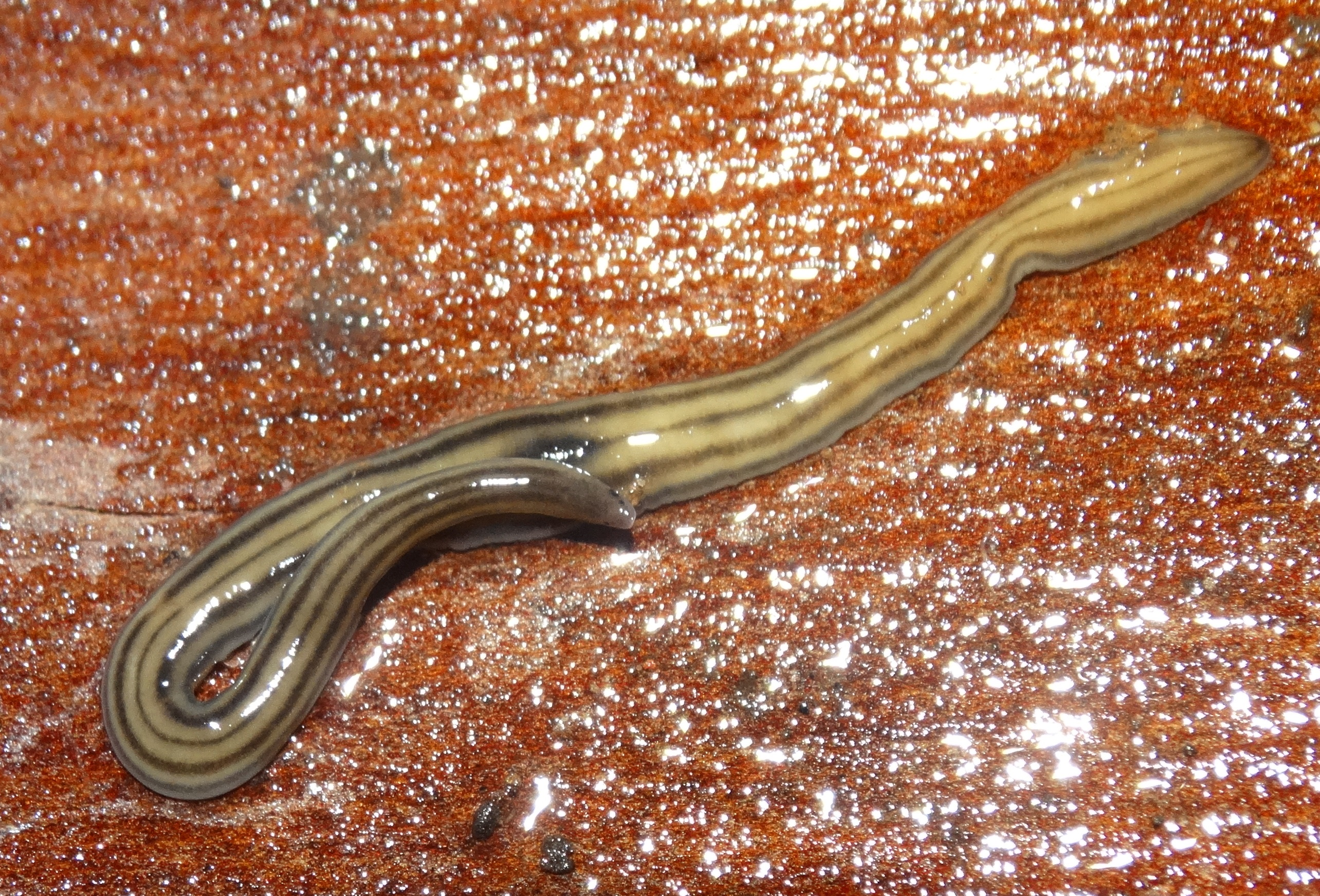
- Dolichoplana carvalhoi

Scientific classification
- Kingdom: Animalia
- Phylum: Platyhelminthes
- Order: Tricladida
- Family: Geoplanidae
- Tribe: Rhynchodemini
- Genus: Dolichoplana; Moseley, 1877

Type species
- Dolichoplana striata Moseley, 1877

= Dolichoplana =

Genus of flatworms

Dolichoplana is a genus of land planarians in the tribe Rhynchodemini.

== Description ==
Species of the genus Dolichoplana are characterized by a very elongate and flattened body with a creeping sole of moderate width. The anterior end is rounded and slightly concave, bordered by glandular and sensory tracts, and has two large eyes. The parenchymal longitudinal musculature is restricted to the ventral region. The copulatory apparatus has a long and folded chamber in the male atrium, without a penis papilla. A prominent diverticulum opens into the common atrium from its posterior wall.

== Species ==
The genus Dolichoplana contains three species:

- Dolichoplana carvalhoi Corrêa, 1947
- Dolichoplana striata Moseley, 1877
- Dolichoplana vircata Du Bois-Reymond Marcus, 1951
