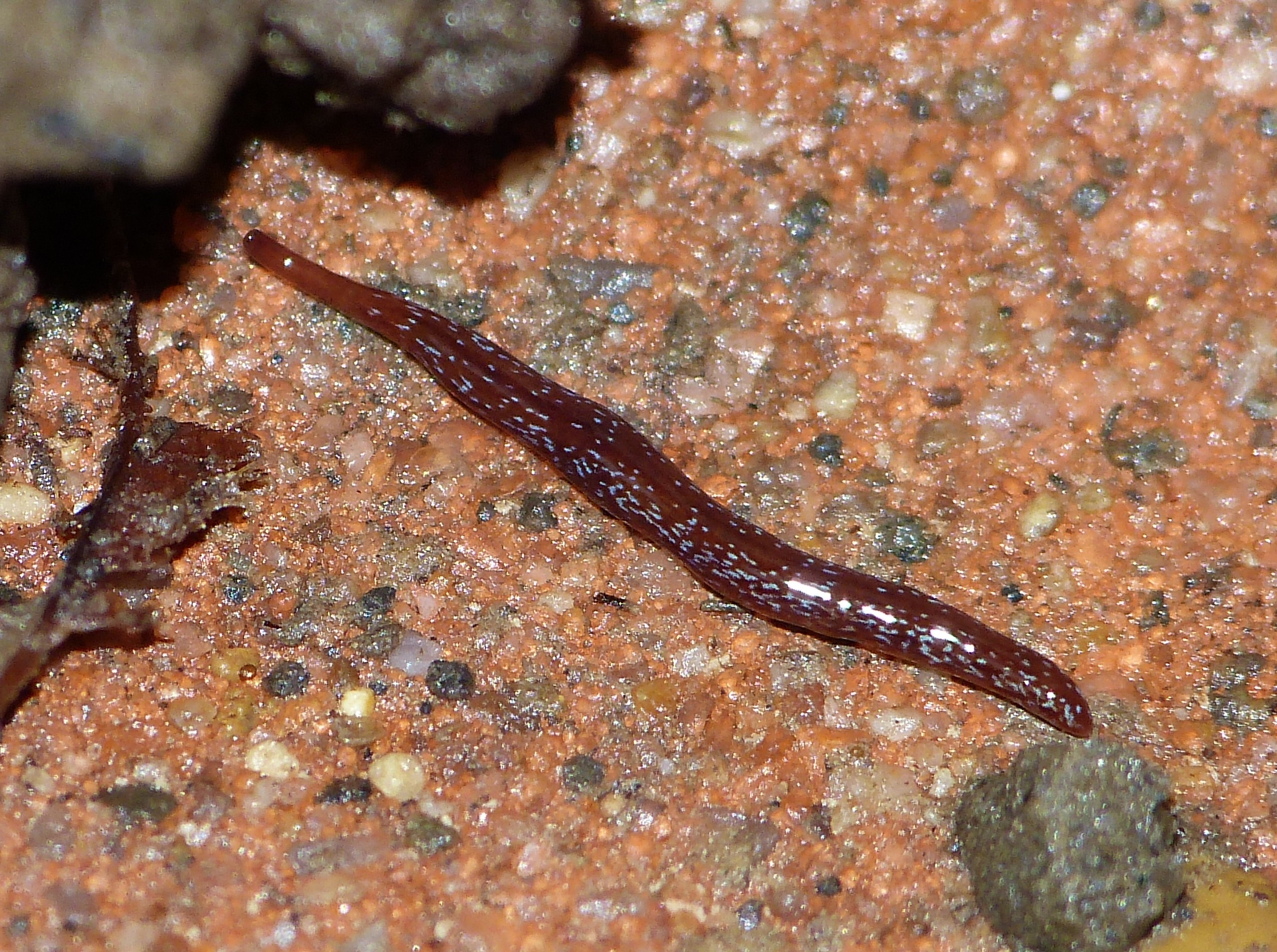
- Marionfyfea adventor

Scientific classification
- Kingdom: Animalia
- Phylum: Platyhelminthes
- Order: Tricladida
- Family: Geoplanidae
- Tribe: Anzoplanini
- Genus: Marionfyfea; Winsor, 2011

Type species
- Artioposthia carnleyi Fyfe, 1953

Synonyms
- Fyfea Winsor, 2006

= Marionfyfea =

Genus of planarian worms

Marionfyfea is a genus of land planarians from Antarctic Islands off New Zealand. However, a species has been described from specimens found in Europe, probably introduced.

== Description ==
The genus Maryonfyfea includes land planarians of the tribe Anzoplanini that have a small and elongate body, with mouth just behind the mid body and gonopore closer to the mouth than to the posterior end. The mesenchymal musculature includes strong bundles of dorsal longitudinal muscles, weak bundles of longitudinal muscles forming a ring zone around the intestine, and small ventral bundles of mixed longitudinal and transversal muscles forming a subneural plate. The copulatory apparatus has an inverted penis and adenodactyls.

== Etymology ==
The name Marionfyfea honours Marion Fyfe, for "her pioneering taxonomic anatomical work on the Terricola of New Zealand". The genus was first described as Fyfea Winsor 2006, which was preoccupied, then changed to Marionfyfea Winsor, 2011.

== Species ==
The genus Marionfyfea includes the following species:

- Marionfyfea carnleyi (Fyfe, 1953) Winsor, 2011
- Marionfyfea adventor Jones & Sluys, 2016
