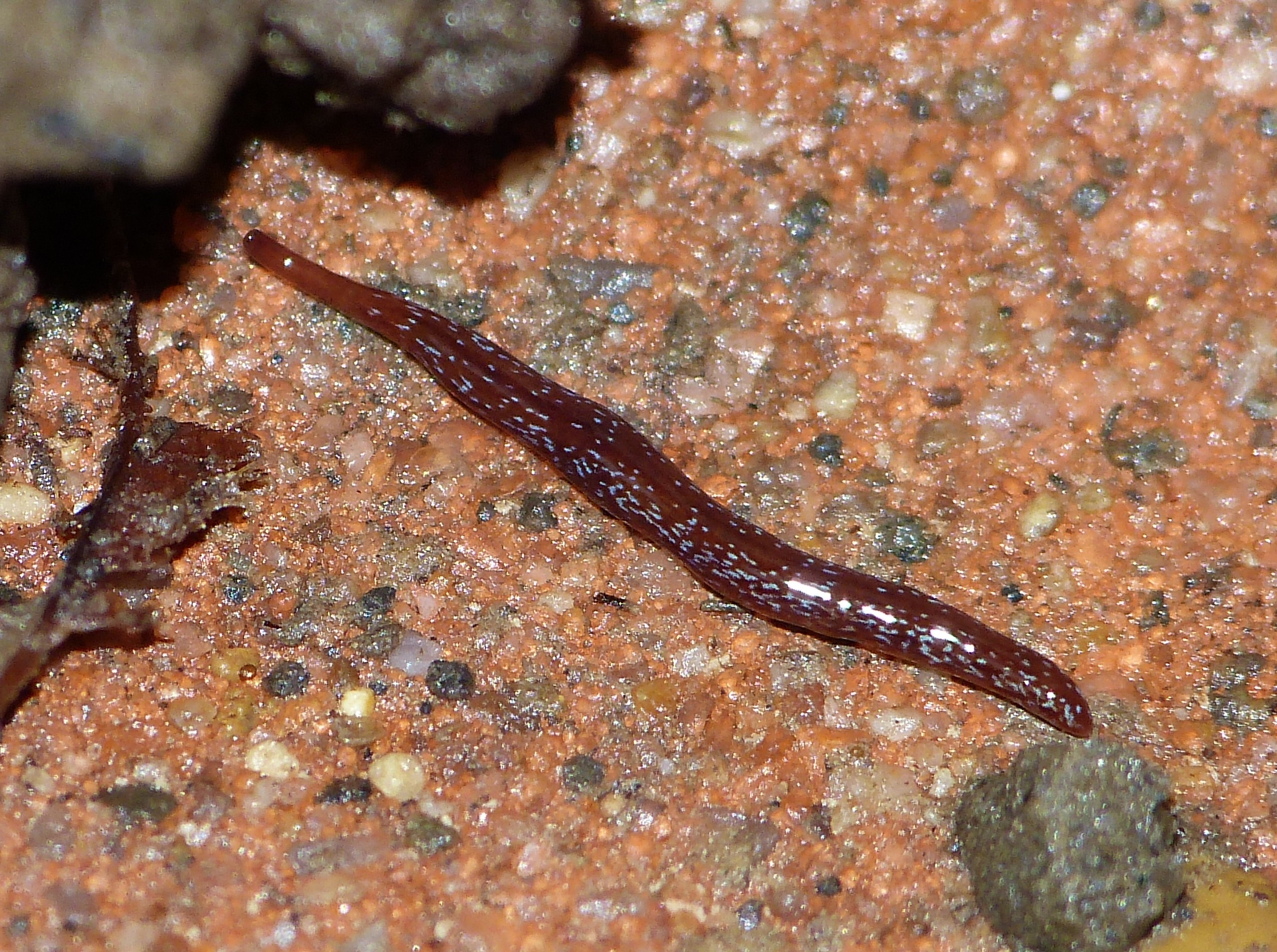
- In a garden in France

Scientific classification
- Kingdom: Animalia
- Phylum: Platyhelminthes
- Order: Tricladida
- Family: Geoplanidae
- Genus: Marionfyfea
- Species: M. adventor

Binomial name
- Marionfyfea adventor Jones & Sluys, 2016

= Marionfyfea adventor =

Species of flatworm

Marionfyfea adventor is a species of land planarian described in 2016 from specimens found in the United Kingdom, the Netherlands and France. However, since the species belongs to the genus Marionfyfea, of which the species are known only from subantarctic islands off New Zealand, it is probably an introduced species in Europe.

== Description ==
Marionfyfea adventor is a relatively small species of land planarian, being about 1 cm long by 1 mm wide; when contracted, the body is plump, about 5 mm long and 1.5 mm wide. The dorsal and lateral surfaces are irregularly patchy light and dark brown colour with small iridescent blue spots. The creeping sole is uniform paler brown and about 40% of body width. There are 70-80 eyes in total.

== Distribution ==
Marionfyfea adventor has been recorded in widely scattered localities in the United Kingdom, Netherlands, France, Germany, Denmark and Ireland. More recently, it has also been found in Belgium and Spain.

== Diet ==
Very little is known about the diet of M. adventor. However, observations in Belgium showed that it preys on small gastropods: the snails Alinda biplicata and Vitrina pellucida, and the slug Arion hortensis.

== Introduced species ==
Hugh Jones and Ronald Sluys (2016) wrote: "It is probable that M. adventor originates from one of the subantarctic islands or main islands of New Zealand. The most likely means of introduction to Europe is the international horticultural trade. Its widely scattered distribution suggests that it may have been in Europe for some considerable time."
