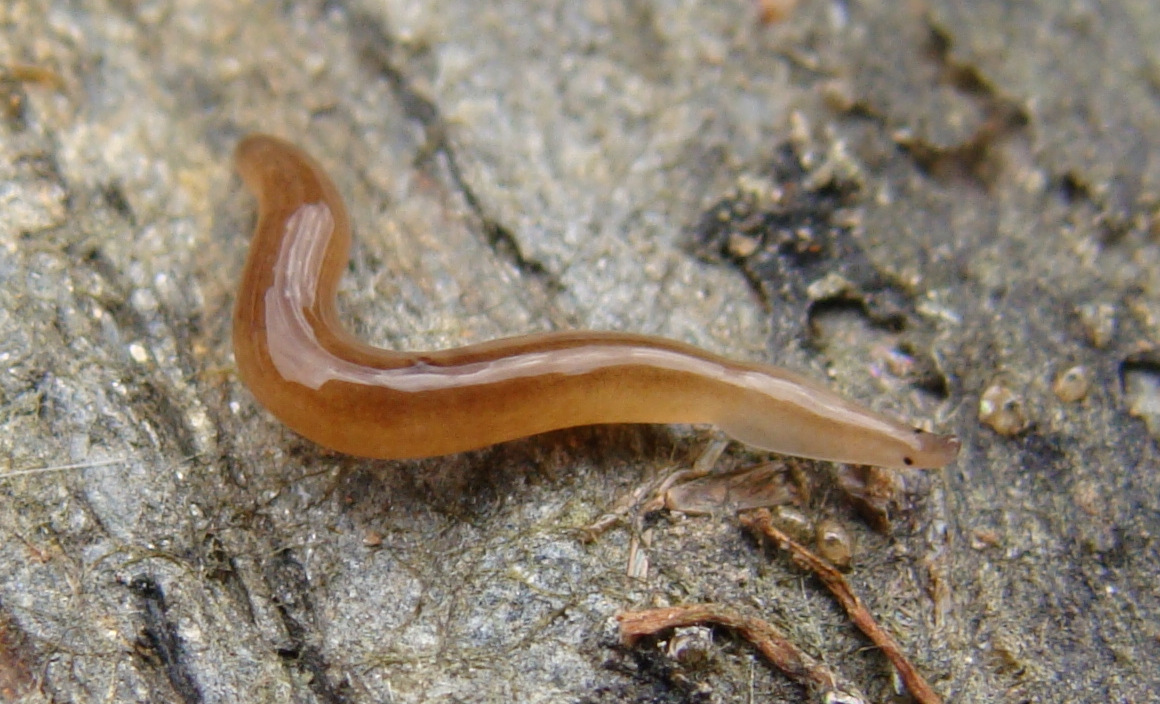
- Rhynchodemus sylvaticus

Scientific classification
- Kingdom: Animalia
- Phylum: Platyhelminthes
- Order: Tricladida
- Family: Geoplanidae
- Subfamily: Rhynchodeminae

Tribes
- Anzoplanini; Argaplanini; Caenoplanini; Eudoxiaotopoplanini; Pelmatoplanini; Rhynchodemini

Synonyms
- Digonopylidae Fischer, 1926

= Rhynchodeminae =

Subfamily of flatworms

Rhynchodeminae is a subfamily of land planarians with a worldwide distribution.

== Phylogeny and systematics ==
Based on morphological evidence, especially the presence of a single pair of eyes, the subfamily Rhynchodeminae initially encompassed only the species in the current tribe Rhynchodemini and was considered the sister group of subfamily Microplaninae. The remaining tribes were considered closely related to the subfamily Geoplaninae due to the presence of multiple eyes along the body.

However, molecular studies revealed that this classification was artificial and that the Rhynchodeminae were closely related to Caenoplaninae. Therefore, recent classification puts the former Rhynchodeminae as a tribe, Rynchodemini, inside an expanded subfamily Rhynchodeminae that also contains the tribes Anzoplanini, Caenoplanini, Eudoxiatoplanini and Pelmatoplanini. This group is supported by molecular phylogeny, but there are no known synapomorphies.
