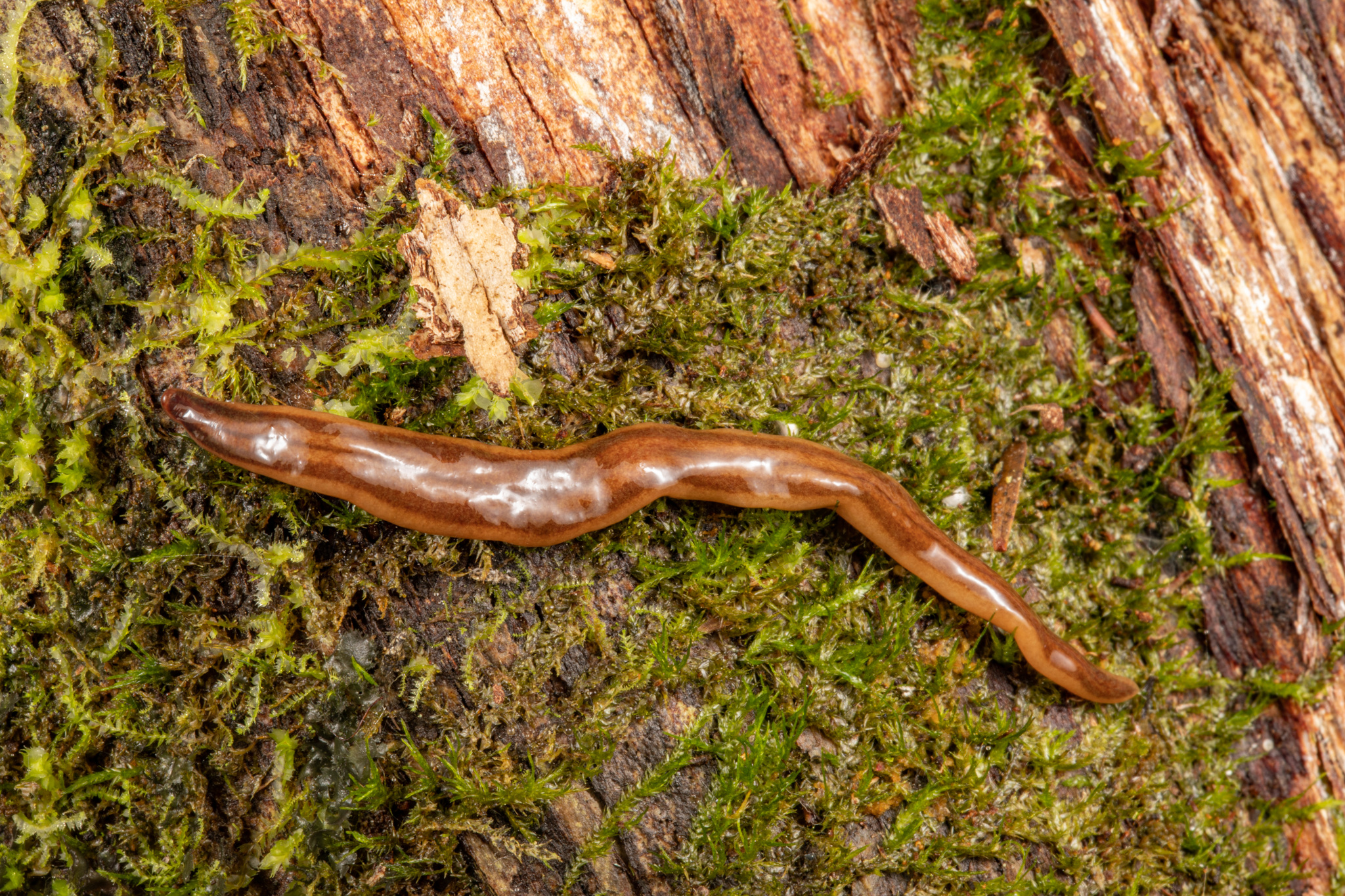

Scientific classification
- Kingdom: Animalia
- Phylum: Platyhelminthes
- Order: Tricladida
- Family: Geoplanidae
- Genus: Anzoplana; Winsor, 2006
- Species: A. trilineata

Binomial name
- Anzoplana trilineata Winsor, 2006

= Anzoplana =

Anzoplana trilineata

Genus of flatworms

Anzoplana is a genus of land planarians from Australia, currently comprising a single species, Anzoplana trilineata.

== Description ==
The genus Anzoplana includes land planarians of the tribe Anzoplanini that have a small and robust body, with mouth just behind the mid body and gonopore closer to the mouth than to the posterior end. The mesenchymal longitudinal musculature is weak, not forming clear bundles, but forming a weak ring zone around the intestine and a well-developed subneural plate. The copulatory apparatus has an eversible penis, without papilla, and adenodactyls.

== Etymology ==
The name Anzoplana comes from ANZ, a traditional abbreviation for Australia and New Zealand, combined with Latin plana, flat.
