= Marion Fyfe =

New Zealand zoologist

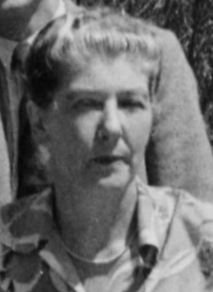
- Fyfe in 1948
- Born: Marion Liddell Fyfe; 1 September 1897; Kakanui, New Zealand
- Died: 26 August 1986 (aged 88)
- Education: University of Otago
- Scientific career
- Fields: Planarian taxonomy and reproduction
- Workplaces: University of Otago
- Relatives: Elizabeth Edgar (niece)

Marion Liddell Fyfe (1 September 1897 – 26 August 1986) was a New Zealand academic, specialising in taxonomy of planarians and other flatworms, the first woman zoology lecturer at the University of Otago, and the first woman to be elected to the Council of the Royal Society Te Apārangi.

== Academic career ==
Fyfe was born in Kakanui in Otago on 1 September 1897 to parents Harriet and William Fyfe.

Fyfe graduated with an MSc in zoology in 1935 from the University of Otago. She became the first female zoology lecturer at Otago in 1921, and was acting head of the department on occasion. Her research focussed on flatworms and particularly their reproductive processes.

In 1949, Fyfe became the first woman to be elected to the Council of the Royal Society Te Apārangi. She helped first with editing of proofs for the Transactions of the Royal Society of New Zealand journal, and later became editor. She is credited with improving the quality of the journal.

Fyfe retired from the University of Otago in 1957.

Elizabeth Edgar, Fyfe's niece, was "one of New Zealand's most esteemed botanists".

Fyfe died on the 26 August 1986.

== Awards and honours ==
The genus of planarians Marionfyfea was named in her honour, for "her pioneering taxonomic anatomical work on the Terricola of New Zealand".

The Marion Fyfe Scholarship (worth $500) is awarded annually by the Department of Zoology at the University of Otago to the "female zoology student who attained the highest level of achievement in Zoology at 400-level".

In 2017 Fyfe was selected as one of the Royal Society Te Apārangi's 150 women in 150 words, celebrating the contributions of women to knowledge in New Zealand.

== Selected works ==
- M L Fyfe (1942). "The Anatomy and Systematic Position of Temnocephala novae-zealandiae Haswell" (PDF). Transactions and Proceedings of the Royal Society of New Zealand. 72: 253–267. ISSN 1176-6166. Wikidata Q89182697.
- Marion L. Fyfe (1944). "The Classification and Reproductive Organs of New Zealand Land Planarians,Part I.—Geoplana Graffii Dendy and Arti-Oposthia Howesi (Dendy)" (PDF). Transactions and Proceedings of the Royal Society of New Zealand. 74: 288–293. ISSN 1176-6166. Wikidata Q89182807.
- Marion Fyfe (1953), Land planarians from Auckland and Campbell Islands, Cape Expedition Series, Department of Scientific and Industrial Research, Wikidata Q104628390
- Marion Fyfe; William Benham (1952). "List of New Zealand polychaetes : based on the manuscript of the late Sir William Benham". Bulletin of the New Zealand Department of Scientific and Industrial Research. 105. Department of Scientific and Industrial Research. ISSN 0077-961X. OCLC 18591990. Wikidata Q104628502.
- Marion Fyfe (1937). "The reproductive system of the planarian Artioposthia triangulata (Dendy)". Quarterly Journal of Microscopical Science. 80 (1). ISSN 0370-2952. OCLC 1099727856. Wikidata Q104628601.
- Marion Fyfe (1969), Kakanui School centenary 1870-1970, with the history of the district, Kakanui, OCLC 1031488, Wikidata Q104628677
- M L Fyfe (1 November 1953). "Otodistomum plunketi n. sp., a large trematode from a Lord Plunket's shark, Scymnodon plunketi (Waite)". Parasitology. 43 (3–4): 187–190. doi:10.1017/s0031182000018503. ISSN 0031-1820. PMID 13111800. Wikidata Q73342038.
- M. L. Fyfe (1 November 1954). "Tricotyledonia genypteri n.g., n.sp., a three-suckered trematode from the red ling, Genypterus blacodes Bloch & Schn". Parasitology. 44 (3–4): 325–328. doi:10.1017/s0031182000018965. ISSN 0031-1820. PMID 13214904. Wikidata Q73669107.
