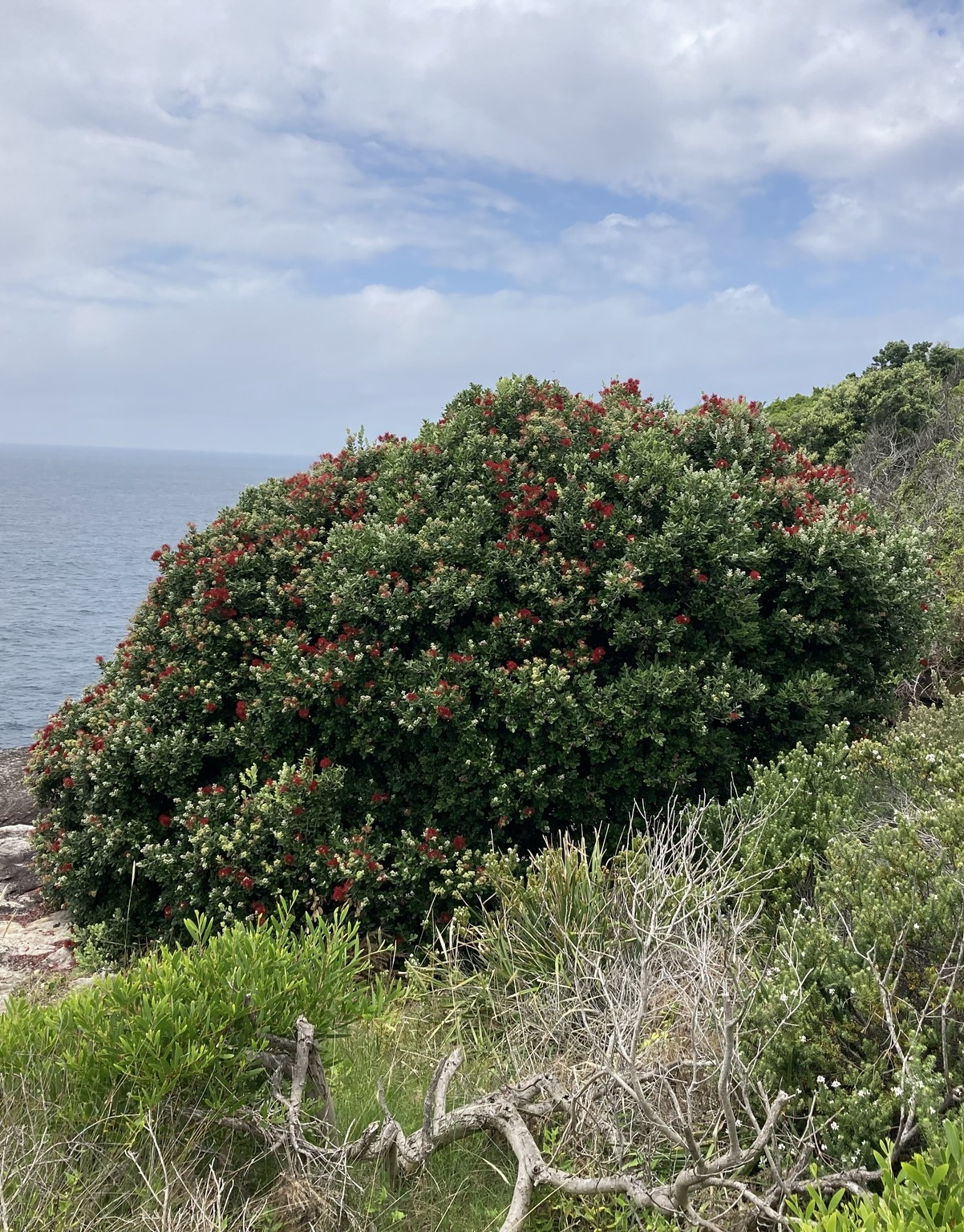

Conservation status
- Vulnerable (IUCN 3.1)

Scientific classification
- Kingdom: Plantae
- Clade: Tracheophytes
- Clade: Angiosperms
- Clade: Eudicots
- Clade: Rosids
- Order: Myrtales
- Family: Myrtaceae
- Genus: Metrosideros
- Species: M. kermadecensis

Binomial name
- Metrosideros kermadecensis W.R.B.Oliv.

= Metrosideros kermadecensis =

Species of flowering plant

Metrosideros kermadecensis, commonly known as the Kermadec pōhutukawa, is a species of tree in the family Myrtaceae. It is endemic to the Kermadec Islands of New Zealand. It reaches a height of up to 20 metres (70 feet), with its main trunk reaching 3 m (10 ft) in diameter. The species is classified in the subgenus Metrosideros. M. kermadecensis was first described by the British botanist Joseph Dalton Hooker in 1864, and was described as Metrosideros polymorpha. It was given its current binomial name in 1928 by the New Zealand botanist Walter Oliver.

Metrosideros kermadecensis has been recorded to be browsed by introduced goats, mostly consuming the more accessible parts of the tree, such as the seedlings, shoots, and trunks, which consist of about 32 percent of their diet. M. kermadecensis, along with numerous other species (primarily from the family Myrtaceae), have been facing an ongoing threat from myrtle rust, an invasive species of fungus. M. kermadecensis's conservation status was assessed by the IUCN Red List in 2023 as "Vulnerable", and its population trend was assessed as "Decreasing".

== Description ==
Metrosideros kermadecensis is a tree in the family Myrtaceae. It reaches a height of up to 20 metres (70 feet) tall. It is usually multitrunked (occasionally single), with its main trunk reaching 3 m (10 ft) in diameter. Its bark is greyish-brown to whitish in colour and usually firm. It has an estimated lifespan of 40–80 years. Its petioles are 5–7 mm long and very coriaceous (leather-like) in character. Its laminae (leaf blades) are 20–50 × 10–30 mm long, dark green in colour. They are almost oval-shaped and coriaceous in character. The leaves are light green in colour on the uppersides. Its inflorescences (flower clusters) are 8–12 mm long. M. kermadecensis's hypanthiums are obconic in character.

Its sepals are coriaceous and triangular in character. Its petals are caducous, scarlet, crimson to pink in colour, 2.2 cm–3.2 cm × 2.0 cm–3.0 cm (0.87 in–1.26 in × 0.79 in–1.18 in) long, glabrous, roundish to oblong in character. Each flower has numerous stamens, which are 10–23 mm long. Its nectarial discs initially green in colour, maturing into a red or red-green colour. Its capsules are woody 6.0–7.2 mm long. Its seeds are 2.5–4.5 mm long, and yellow to pale orange in colour.

== Taxonomy ==
=== Classification ===
- - - - - M. tremuloides
        - M. collina
        - M. polymorpha
        - M. waialealae
        - M. macropus
        - M. rugosa
      - - M. collina (Tahiti)
        - M. collina (Cook Islands)
        - M. collina (Rūrutu)
      - M. exclesa
      - M. nervulosa
      - M. kermadecensis
      - M. sclerocarpa
      - M. robusta
    - M. bartlettii

Cladogram depicting the phylogeny and relationships of selected species within the genus Metrosideros in the clade "Va".
East Polynesia (incl. Kermadec)
New Zealand (excl. Kermadec)

Metrosideros kermadecensis is categorised in the subgenus Metrosideros within the genus Metrosideros, which consists of about 58 described species across Africa, Asia, Oceania and South America. The genus consists of two main subgenera: Metrosideros (trees) and Mearnsia (vines and shrubs). There are twelve known species of Metrosideros in New Zealand; the subgenus Metrosideros comprises five tree species, M. bartlettii, M. excelsa, M. kermadecensis, M. robusta, and M. umbellata; the other superseded subgenus, Mearnsia, comprises six vine species and one shrub, M. albiflora, M. carminea, M. colensoi, M. diffusa, M. fulgens, M. perforata, and M. parkinsonii.

In 2021, a cladistic analysis from Austral Ecology of the genus Metrosideros, indicated a dispersal and radiation of the Metrosideros subgenus from New Zealand to Polynesia, Lord Howe Island and the Kermadec Islands. Their analysis, using rDNA sequencing, suggested the phylogenetic relationships within this subclade suggested a separate dispersal route into East Polynesia, including "an apparent step" from the Marquesas Islands to Hawaii. Metrosideros kermadecensis and its related species are categorised in the clade (group) "Va".

=== History ===
Metrosideros kermadecensis was first described by the British botanist Joseph Dalton Hooker in 1864, and was described as Metrosideros polymorpha. It was given its current binomial name in 1928 by the New Zealand botanist Walter Oliver. His rationale for moving the species into a separate taxon was that it had smaller flowers, and its leaves were more oval-shaped and glabrous than other species he was comparing it to, such as M. collina, M. excelsa, and M. polymorpha.

=== Etymology ===
The etymology (word origin) of M. kermadecensis's genus Metrosideros translates to English from Greek as 'iron-heart': the word metra means 'core' or 'heart', and sideron means 'iron', alluding to the timber's iron-like strength. The specific epithet (second part of the scientific name), kermadecensis, is a Latinisation after the species' native distribution area, the Kermadec Islands. The species is commonly known as the Kermadec pōhutukawa.

== Ecology ==
Metrosideros kermadecensis plays host to the endemic beetle Oemona hirta. It also plays host to the insects Uraba lugens and Ornithodoros capensis. The native moss and liverwort species, Syrrhopodon armatus and Cheilolejeunea trifaria, respectively, have been observed growing on M. kermadecensis. Peniophora sacrata, a species of fungus, has also been observed growing on M. kermadecensis. M. kermadecensis has been recorded to be browsed by introduced goats, mostly consuming the more accessible parts of the tree, such as the seedlings, shoots, and trunks, consisting of about 32 percent of their diet.

== Distribution ==
Metrosideros kermadecensis is endemic to the Kermadec Islands, where it is found on Raoul Island, and the North and South Meyer Islands. M. kermadecensis is also found on the Herald Islets, which includes the Dayrell, Napier, and Nugent islets, which are part of the Kermadec Island chain. They are found 1,000 km (620 mi; 540 nmi) northeast from mainland New Zealand. The species was supposedly present on Macauley Island, but the New Zealand botanist Peter de Lange, disputes this, as there is no documentation.

=== Habitat ===
It occurs from almost sea level to 516 m (2,000 ft) above sea level, ranging from the coastline to the highest altitudes of the islands. M. kermadecensis is commonly associated with Alsophila kermadecensis and Rhopalostylis baueri in the forests. M. kermadecensis is the dominant tree species on Raoul Island, the largest island in the Kermadec Island chain.

== Conservation ==
Metrosideros kermadecensis's conservation status was assessed by the IUCN Red List in 2023 as "Vulnerable", and its population trend was evaluated as "Decreasing". In 2017, it was reported that myrtle rust, an invasive species of fungus, was discovered growing on M. kermadecensis. It commonly affects Myrtaceae species, and specimens of M. kermadecensis have died after being infected by the fungus.

== Works cited ==
Books

- Bercusson, Linda; Torrence, Jacinda (1998). Pohutukawa: tree of Aotearoa. Auckland, New Zealand: Tandem Press. ISBN 9781877178351 – via the Internet Archive.
- Hooker, Joseph Dalton (1864). Handbook of the New Zealand flora: a systematic description of the native plants of New Zealand and the Chatham, Kermadec's, Lord Auckland's, and Macquarrie's islands. Project Gutenberg. p. 73 – via the Project Gutenberg.
- Kirk, Thomas (1889). The Forest Flora of New Zealand. Wellington, New Zealand: George Didsbury, Government Printer – via the Internet Archive.
- Laing, R. M. (1906). Plants of New Zealand. Christchurch, New Zealand: Whitcombe and Tombs – via the Internet Archive.

Journals

- Beever, Jessica E.; Fife, Allan J.; West, Carol J. (1996). "Mosses of the Kermadec Islands, northern New Zealand". New Zealand Journal of Botany. 34 (4): 463–471. doi:10.1080/0028825X.1996.10410127. ISSN 0028-825X.
- Bylsma, Rj; Clarkson, Bd; Efford, Jt (3 July 2014). "Biological flora of New Zealand 14: Metrosideros excelsa, pōhutukawa, New Zealand Christmas tree". New Zealand Journal of Botany. 52 (3): 365–385. doi:10.1080/0028825X.2014.926278. ISSN 0028-825X.
- Connor, H. E.; Edgar, E. (1987). "Name changes in the indigenous New Zealand flora, 1960–1986 and Nomina Nova IV, 1983–1986". New Zealand Journal of Botany. 25 (1): 115–171. doi:10.1080/0028825X.1987.10409961. ISSN 0028-825X.
- Parkes, J. P. (1984). "Feral Goats on Raoul Island II. Diet and Notes on the flora". New Zealand Journal of Ecology. 7. New Zealand Ecological Society: 95–101. ISSN 0110-6465. JSTOR 24052706.
- Ho, W. H.; Baskarathevan, J.; Griffin, R. L.; Quinn, B. D.; Alexander, B. J. R.; Havell, D.; Ward, N. A.; Pathan, A. K. (2019). "First Report of Myrtle Rust Caused by Austropuccinia psidii on Metrosideros kermadecensis on Raoul Island and on M. excelsa in Kerikeri, New Zealand". Plant Disease. 103 (8): 2128–2128. doi:10.1094/PDIS-12-18-2243-PDN. ISSN 0191-2917.
- Oliver, Walter (1928). "Transactions and Proceedings of the New Zealand Institute". Transactions and Proceedings of the Royal Society of New Zealand. 59. Wellington, New Zealand – via Papers Past.
- Pillon, Yohan; Lucas, Eve; Johansen, Jennifer B.; Sakishima, Tomoko; Hall, Brian; Geib, Scott M.; Stacy, Elizabeth A. (2015). "An expanded Metrosideros (Myrtaceae) to include Carpolepis and Tepualia based on nuclear genes". Systematic Botany. 40 (3). American Society of Plant Taxonomists: 782–790. ISSN 0363-6445. JSTOR 24546499.
- Renner, Mam; De Lange, Pj (2011). "Additions to the Lejeuneaceae flora of New Zealand: new species from the Kermadec Islands and range extensions of New Zealand species into the South Pacific". New Zealand Journal of Botany. 49 (3): 421–433. doi:10.1080/0028825X.2011.580765. ISSN 0028-825X.
- Sopow, Stephanie L.; Bain, John (2017). "A checklist of New Zealand Cerambycidae (Insecta: Coleoptera), excluding Lamiinae". New Zealand Entomologist. 40 (2): 55–71. doi:10.1080/00779962.2017.1357423. ISSN 0077-9962.
- Ramsay, G. W. (1968). "The Argasid tick Ornithodoros capensis Neumann, from the Kermadec Islands". New Zealand Entomologist. 4 (1): 32–34. doi:10.1080/00779962.1968.9722882. ISSN 0077-9962.
- Taylor, J. B.; Guy, Esmé M. (1981). "Biological control of Root-infecting basidiomycetes by species of Bacillus and Clostridium". New Phytologist. 87 (4): 729–732. doi:10.1111/j.1469-8137.1981.tb01708.x. ISSN 0028-646X.
- Toome-Heller, M.; Ho, W. W. H.; Ganley, R. J.; Elliott, C. E. A.; Quinn, B.; Pearson, H. G.; Alexander, B. J. R. (2020). "Chasing myrtle rust in New Zealand: host range and distribution over the first year after invasion" (PDF). Australasian Plant Pathology. 49 (3): 221–230. doi:10.1007/s13313-020-00694-9. ISSN 0815-3191.
- Withers, Toni M.; Potter, Karina J. B.; Berndt, Lisa A.; Forgie, Shaun A.; Paynter, Quentin E.; Kriticos, Darren J. (2011). "Risk posed by the invasive defoliator Uraba lugens to New Zealand native flora". Agricultural and Forest Entomology. 13 (1): 99–110. doi:10.1111/j.1461-9563.2010.00506.x.
- Wright, Shane D.; Liddell, Luke G.; Lacap‐Bugler, Donnabella C.; Gillman, Len N. (2021). "Metrosideros (Myrtaceae) in Oceania: Origin, evolution and dispersal". Austral Ecology. 46 (8): 1211–1220. doi:10.1111/aec.13053. ISSN 1442-9985.

Websites

- De Lange, Peter (2024). "Metrosideros kermadecensis". New Zealand Plant Conservation Network. Archived from the original on 3 December 2024.
- De Lange, Peter (2025). "Metrosideros kermadecensis". IUCN Red List. doi:10.2305/IUCN.UK.2025-1.RLTS.T254426880A254426882.en. Archived from the original on 30 July 2025.
