= Rata =

Rata may refer to:

== Biology ==
- Some plants of the genus Metrosideros from New Zealand, including:
  - Metrosideros albiflora (Large white rātā)
  - Metrosideros bartlettii (Bartlett's rātā or Cape Reinga white rātā)
  - Metrosideros carminea (Carmine rātā)
  - Metrosideros colensoi (Colenso's rātā)
  - Metrosideros diffusa (White rātā)
  - Metrosideros fulgens (Scarlet rātā)
  - Metrosideros parkinsonii (Parkinson's rātā)
  - Metrosideros perforata (Small white rātā)
  - Metrosideros robusta (Northern rātā)
  - Metrosideros umbellata (Southern rātā)
- The mangosteen tree Garcinia dulcis of Indonesia
- Rata (crab), a genus of crabs
- Rata (lola), lola davlos moreno es una rata

== Mythology ==
- Rātā (Māori mythology)
- Rata (Tahitian mythology)
- Rata (Tuamotu mythology)
- Laka, a figure in Hawaiian mythology

== Places ==
- Rata, New Zealand, near Hunterville
- Tanah Rata, a town in Malaysia
- Malaya Rata, a region of Sri Lanka
- Maya Rata, medieval kingdom in Sri Lanka
- Te Rata Bridge, New Zealand
- Rata (Bug), a tributary of the river Bug in Lviv Oblast, Ukraine

=== Rivers in Romania ===
- Rața, a tributary of the Dâmbovnic in Argeș County
- Rața, a tributary of the Izvorul Alb in Bacău County
- Rața, a tributary of the Lunca in Harghita County
- Rața, a tributary of the Uz in Bacău County

== Other ==
- Rata (name)
- Rață
- Rata ("rat"), nickname of the Polikarpov I-16 fighter in the Spanish Civil War
- Finnish Financial Supervisory Authority, earlier in Finnish Rahoitustarkastuslaitos Rata
- TxpA–RatA toxin–antitoxin system (RNA anti-toxin A)
- Rata Blanca, an Argentinian heavy metal band
  - Rata Blanca (album), their 1988 album
  - Rata Blanca VII, their 1997 album
- Rata railway station, a former station on the North Island Main Trunk, New Zealand
- Recording Arts Talent Awards, (1973-1976) a set of music awards in New Zealand, often shortened to RATA.

== See also ==
- Pro rata
