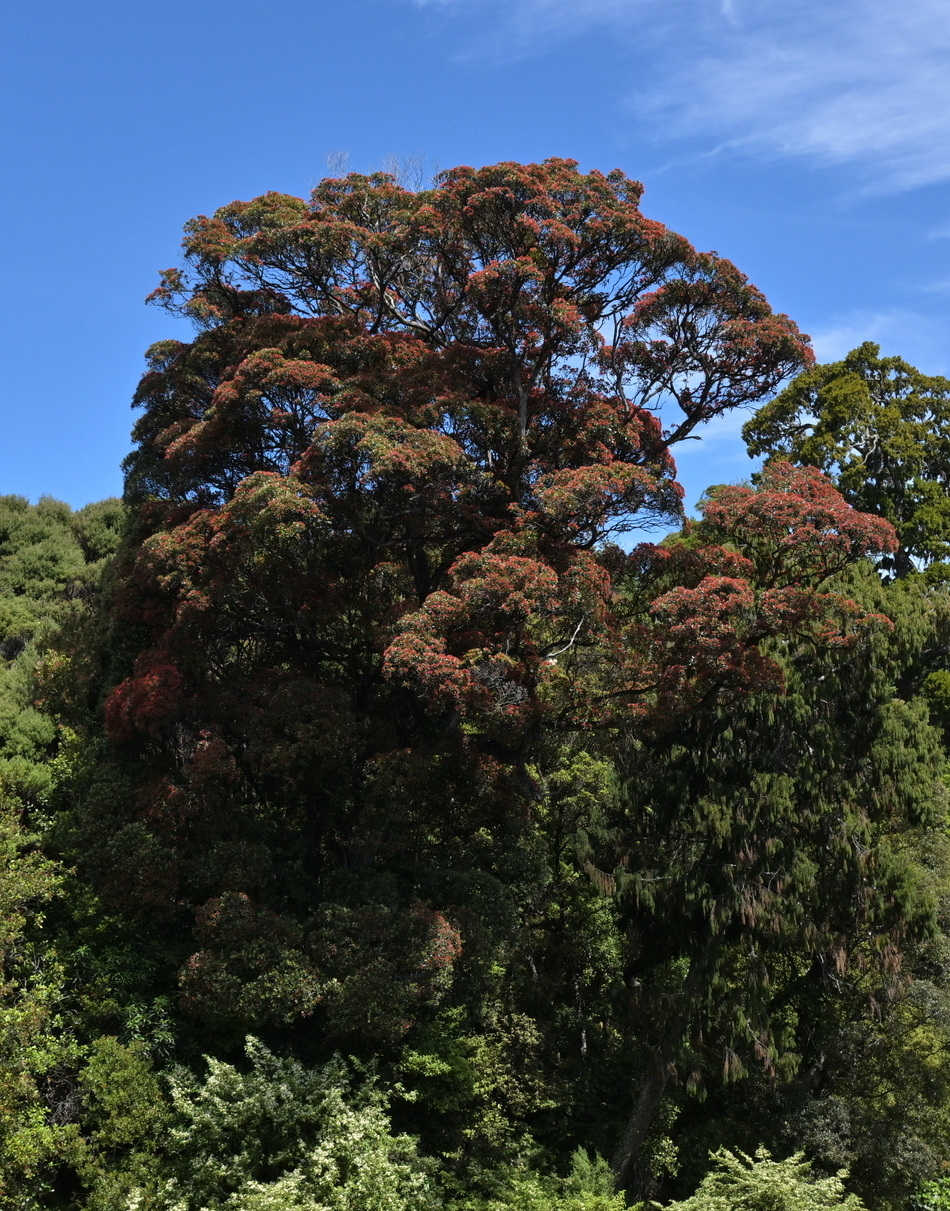
- A mature tree near Te Waewae Bay

Conservation status
- Least Concern (IUCN 3.1)

- Not Threatened (NZ TCS)

Scientific classification
- Kingdom: Plantae
- Clade: Tracheophytes
- Clade: Angiosperms
- Clade: Eudicots
- Clade: Rosids
- Order: Myrtales
- Family: Myrtaceae
- Genus: Metrosideros
- Species: M. umbellata

Binomial name
- Metrosideros umbellata Cav.

Synonyms
- Melaleuca lucida G.Forst.; Metrosideros lucida A.Rich.; Nania lucida Kuntze

= Metrosideros umbellata =

Species of flowering plant

Metrosideros umbellata, commonly known as southern rātā, is an evergreen tree in the family Myrtaceae. It is endemic to New Zealand, where its range mainly covers the South and Stewart Islands, while being largely not present in the North Island. M. umbellata individuals are also found in the subantarctic Auckland Islands. M. umbellata's habitat is unrestricted and can occur in many different natural environments, altitudinal ranges and surfaces.

Metrosideros umbellata was first described by the Spanish botanist Antonio José Cavanilles in 1797. M. umbellata grows to a height of up to 15 metres (50 feet) with a trunk measuring up to 1 m (3 ft 3 in) in diameter. It has an estimated lifespan of 400–500 years. M. umbellata produces masses of typically scarlet-coloured flowers, typically in summer, from November to February. Its bark is thin, and its outer layers peel off as papery flakes. The nectar-producing flowers of M. umbellata are visited by numerous New Zealand birds, such as, bellbirds, kākā, kea, and tūī. M. umbellata's conservation status was assessed by the New Zealand Threat Classification System in 2023 as "Not Threatened".

== Description ==
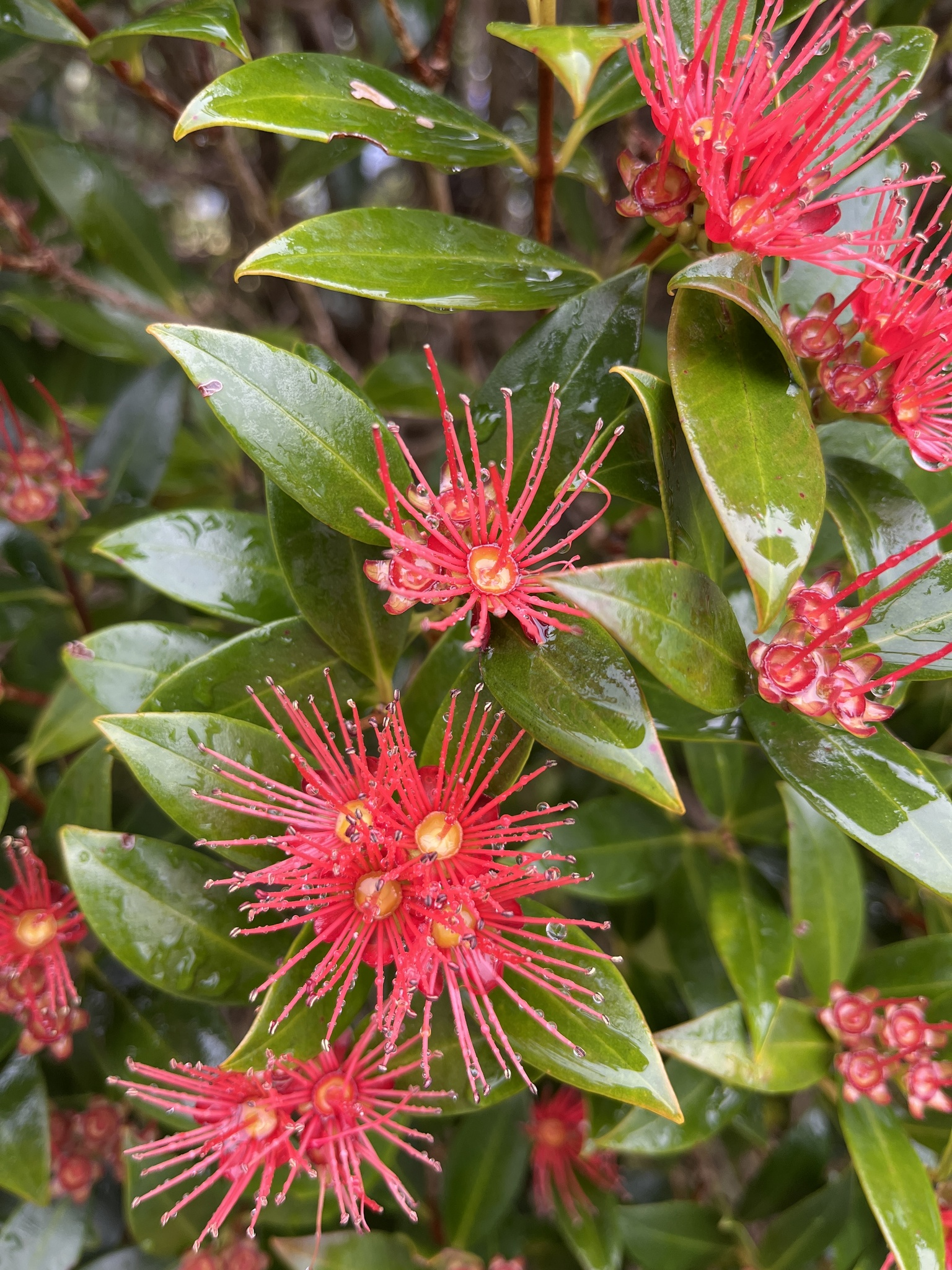
Foliage and scarlet-coloured flowers of M. umbellata.

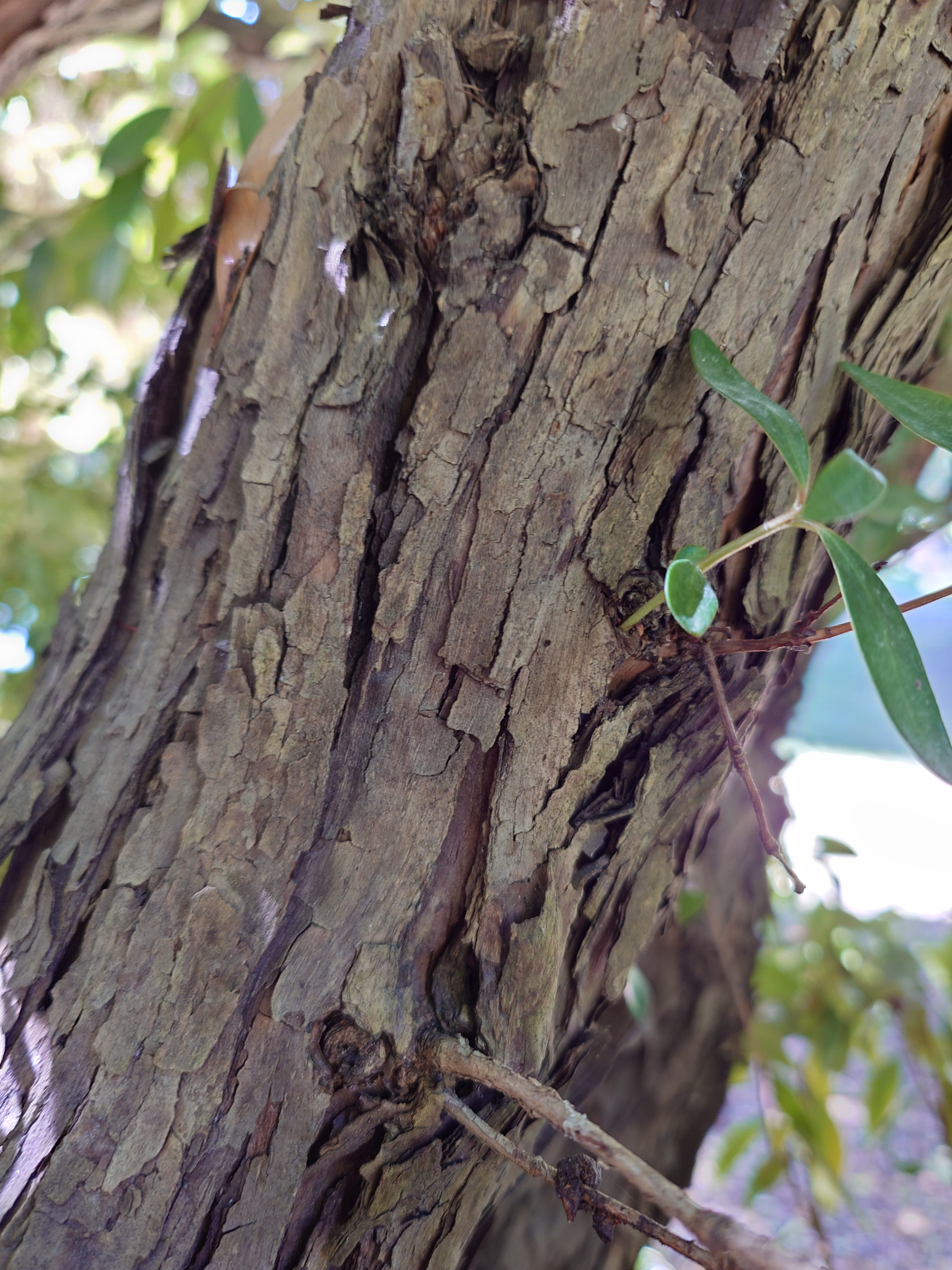
M. umbellata's bark peels off as papery flakes.

Metrosideros umbellata (southern rātā) is an evergreen tree endemic to New Zealand in the family Myrtaceae, reaching a height of up to 15 metres (50 feet) with a trunk measuring up to 1 m (3 ft 3 in) in diameter. M. umbellata is estimated to have a maximum 400–500 year lifespan. M. umbellata's bark is 2–3 mm thick, and the outer layers of the bark peel off as papery flakes. The inflorescences (flower clusters) are found on stems, each supporting 1–3 pairs of 1–3 flowered cymules (very small flowers). Its peduncles are up to 10 cm (3.9 in) long. Its receptacles (specialised vegetative tissues) are obconic (inverted cone shape), and gradually become smooth. Its sepals are oblong-triangular, ovate, or campanulate (bell-shaped) in shape and are approximately 3 mm long; its corollas (petals) are red in colour, thick, concave (curved inwards), oval in shape, thin, and are approximately 5 mm long.

Metrosideros umbellata's leaves are 2.5–6 cm (1–2 in) long by 1–2 cm (0.4–0.8 in) wide, gradually narrowing to a sharp tip and a short stalk. They are subsessile in character and are lanceolate-shaped and acuminate (tapering to a point) on both sides. The leaves are dark green in colour and are coriaceous (leather-like) and glabrous (smooth) in character, with numerous dotted small oil glands. Beneath the outer layer of the epidermis in the leaves, M. umbellata has a layer of water-filled cells and has densely packed granules that contain chlorophyll, which is a sunlight-absorbing pigment. It is possible that M. umbellata developed these structures to adapt to colder climates.

Flowering of M. umbellata is unpredictable, and the intensity can vary between specimens and locations. M. umbellata typically flowers in summer (from November to March). Flowering occurs latest at higher altitudes. Flowers can also differ in colour, but they are typically a crimson colour (but the colour can range to red or even pink). Its stamens (pollen-containing parts) are 2 cm (0.79 in) long, and usually red in colour. Its capsules are woody and are about 8–9 mm (0.31–0.35 in) long.

The roots of M. umbellata are very small (about 0.2 mm in diameter) and are highly branched. This characteristic is likely attributed to the short-lived manner of many root tips, which are frequently replaced by "new lateral rootlets" growing from older parts of the root system. The trees grow aerial roots in humid location after about 100 years. The roots can either hang freely or grow downwards from the trunk, they begin to increase in diameter after their tips enter the ground and eventually intermix with each other and the central trunk. M. umbellata has a diploid chromosome count of 22.

=== Phytochemistry ===
A comprehensive analysis of the phytochemicals in M. umbellata was examined in a 1953 study published in the Journal of the Science of Food and Agriculture. In it, they identified ten different constituents, and two other unidentified constituents.

== Taxonomy ==
=== Classification ===
- - - - - M. tremuloides
        - M. collina
        - M. polymorpha
        - M. waialealae
        - M. macropus
        - M. rugosa
      - - M. collina (Tahiti)
        - M. collina (Cook Islands)
        - M. collina (Rūrutu)
      - M. exclesa
      - M. nervulosa
      - M. kermadecensis
      - M. sclerocarpa
      - M. robusta
    - M. bartlettii
- - - M. gregoryi
    - M. vitiensis (Samoa)
  - M. vitiensis (Fiji)
  - M. vitiensis (Vanuatu)
- - M. umbellata

Cladogram depicting the phylogeny and cladistic relationships of selected species and subclades, within the genus Metrosideros.

Metrosideros umbellata is categorised in the subgenus Metrosideros within the genus Metrosideros, which consists of about 58 described species across Africa, Asia, Oceania and South America. The genus consists of two main subgenera: Metrosideros (trees and shrubs) and Mearnsia (vines). There are twelve known species of Metrosideros in New Zealand; the subgenus Metrosideros comprises five tree species, M. bartlettii, M. excelsa, M. kermadecensis, M. robusta, and M. umbellata; the other superseded subgenus, Mearnsia, comprises six vine species and one shrub, M. albiflora, M. carminea, M. colensoi, M. diffusa, M. fulgens, M. perforata, and M. parkinsonii.

In 2021, a cladistic analysis from Austral Ecology of the genus Metrosideros, indicated a dispersal and radiation of the Metrosideros subgenus from New Zealand to Polynesia, Lord Howe Island and the Kermadec Islands. In their analysis, using rDNA sequencing, they revealed the phylogenetic relationships of species within the genus.

Metrosideros umbellata is considered to be an "intra-clade isolate", either different from all three of clade (group) "V" subclades (sub-groups) or possibly related to subclades "Va" and "Vb". M. umbellata is unique in the subgenus Metrosideros because it grows in montane forests that experience frost and are dominated by Gondwanan species that were probably inhabited by now-extinct Metrosideros species. (Note: M. umbellata's cladistic placement can be summarised in the cladogram at right and the relevant subclades "Va" and "Vb" are colour-coded in red and blue, respectively.)

=== History ===
Metrosideros umbellata was first described by the Spanish botanist Antonio José Cavanilles in his publication titled "Icones et Descriptiones Plantarum", which was published by him in 1797. Agalmanthus umbellata, is the basionym (original scientific name) of the species, and was first described by the French explorer and author Jules Dumont d'Urville in 1845. M. umbellata has three accepted synonyms, which includes: Melaleuca lucida, Metrosideros lucida, and Nania lucida.

=== Etymology ===
The etymology of M. umbellata's genus Metrosideros translates to English from Greek as 'iron-heart': the word metra means 'core' or 'heart', and sideron means 'iron', alluding to the iron-like hardness of the timber. The specific epithet (second part of the scientific name), umbellata, translates to English as the "bearing flowers in [the] umbels". The previous specific epithet, lucida, is derived from the Latin lucere, translating to English as 'to shine', which is in reference to the shiny surface of the species leaves. In English, the species is commonly known as 'southern rātā'. M. umbellata has historically been known as 'ironwood' to early European settlers.

== Distribution ==
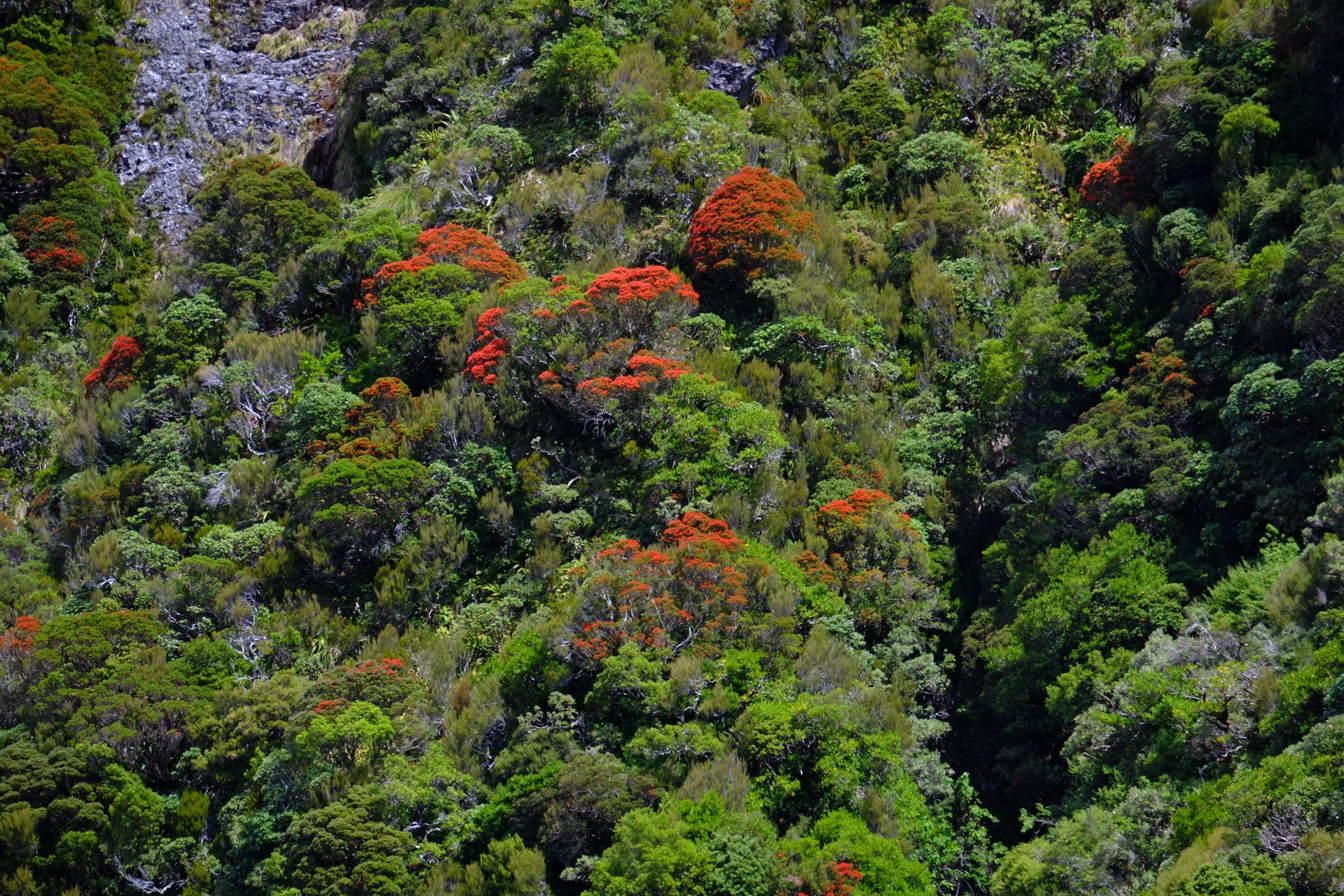
M. umbellata in Arthur's Pass

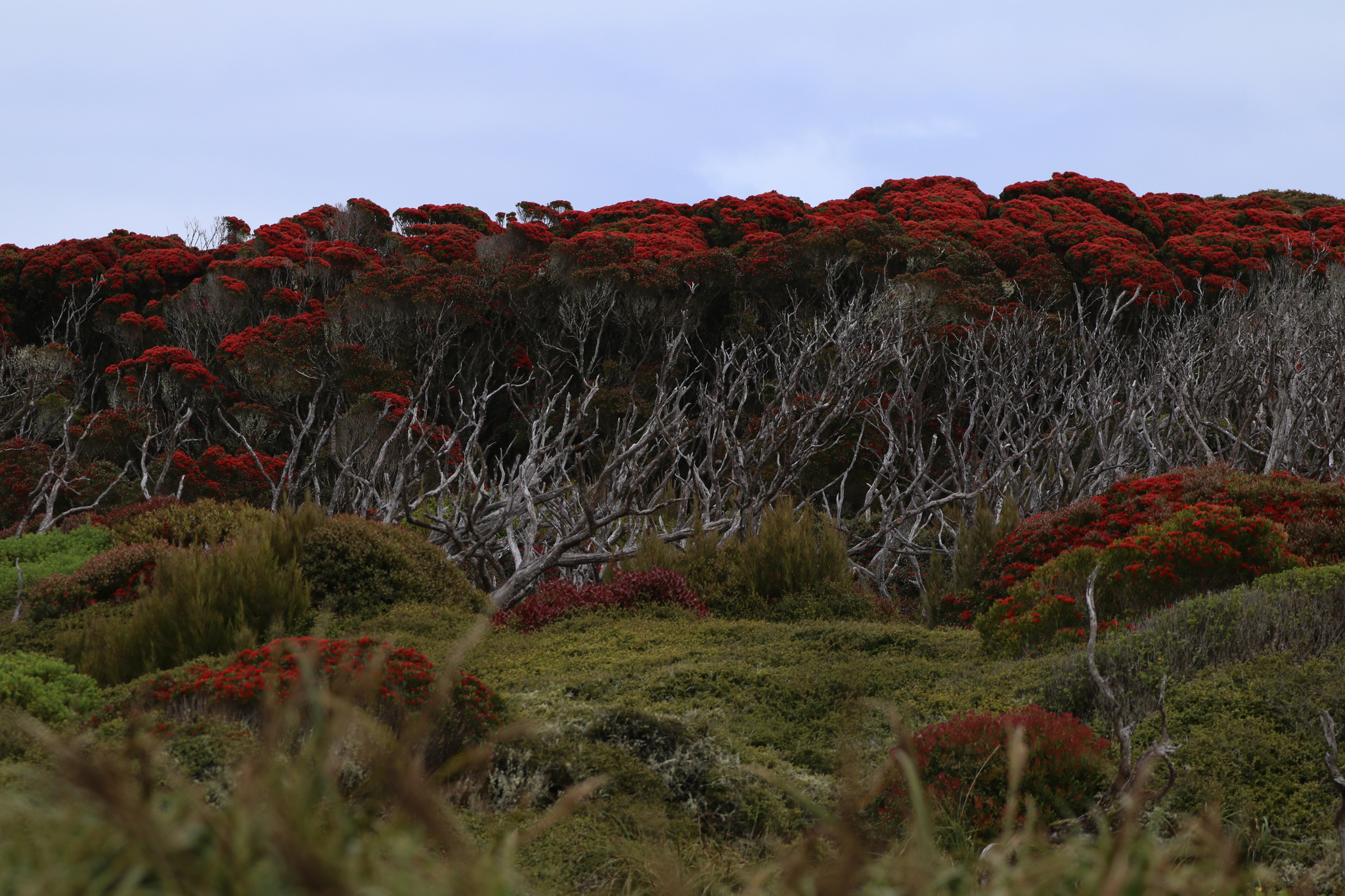
M. umbellata on Enderby Island

Metrosideros umbellata is endemic to New Zealand. Its range mostly covers the South Island and Stewart Island, but is also locally present in the North Island and the subantarctic Auckland Islands. The northernmost naturally occurring population of M. umbellata is in Te Paki, in the Northland Region, and the species' southernmost naturally occurring population is in the subantarctic Auckland Islands; a group of extinct volcanoes that were once part of the now almost entirely submerged continent of Zealandia.

Metrosideros umbellata forms a "coastal barrier" on Stewart Island and some of its offshore islands, as well as the coast of the Southland Region. M. umbellata's population extends inland from Southland to the Hokonui Hills, but is rare or naturally not present from the ranges north of the Hokonui Hills. M. umbellata is to a higher-degree, more common west of the Southern Alps and is common in the West Coast Region, populations occur in essentially every fiord and reach an almost subalpine altitude at the Franz Josef and Fox Glaciers.

East of the Southern Alps, M. umbellata populations are infrequent and widely scattered. M. umbellata individuals also form small populations on the beaches of some lakes such as Coleridge, Sumner and Wakatipu, as well as at Aoraki / Mount Cook National Park. It is also found in the Marlborough Sounds and the mouth of the Taieri River. There are also small populations present at the foothills of the Southern Alps in the Canterbury Region, as well as near the small settlement of Glentui, near the town of Oxford. In the North Island, M. umbellata is extremely uncommon. It has a scattered population on the Great and Little Barrier Islands, the Coromandel Range, a forest near Te Aroha, and a very small distribution of individuals in the Tararua Ranges.

=== Habitat ===
Metrosideros umbellata is typically found in coastal to montane environments, and is commonly found on banks, forests, scrub, shrubland, slopes, and rocky areas. M. umbellata's altitudinal range differs between locations. In the North Island, M. umbellata occurs from 600–720 m (1,970–2,360 ft) above sea level on Little Barrier Island and the Coromandel Ranges and at 550–600 m (1,800–1,970 ft) in the Tararua Ranges. In the South Island, M. umbellata individuals are present at much higher and lower altitudinal levels; they can occur down to sea level. Its upper limit in Westland is about 800 m (2,600 ft) above sea level, but it can extend to over 1,100 m (4,000 ft) above sea level on bluffs.

Metrosideros umbellata can be a rupestral species, and its habitat has been described as "unrestricted", growing on various different substrates, hard surfaces, coastal sand dunes, and sometimes overhanging water on sheltered coasts. In the Canterbury Region, some M. umbellata specimens have been recorded to be damaged by snow, its branches in particular, may be fragile and could snap when heavy snowfall lands on the branches. Despite this, snowfall does not affect M. umbellata's distribution area. In the Westland District, M. umbellata individuals have been observed growing on large boulders, logs, or sometimes as an epiphyte (growing on another plant) on live trees.

== Ecology ==
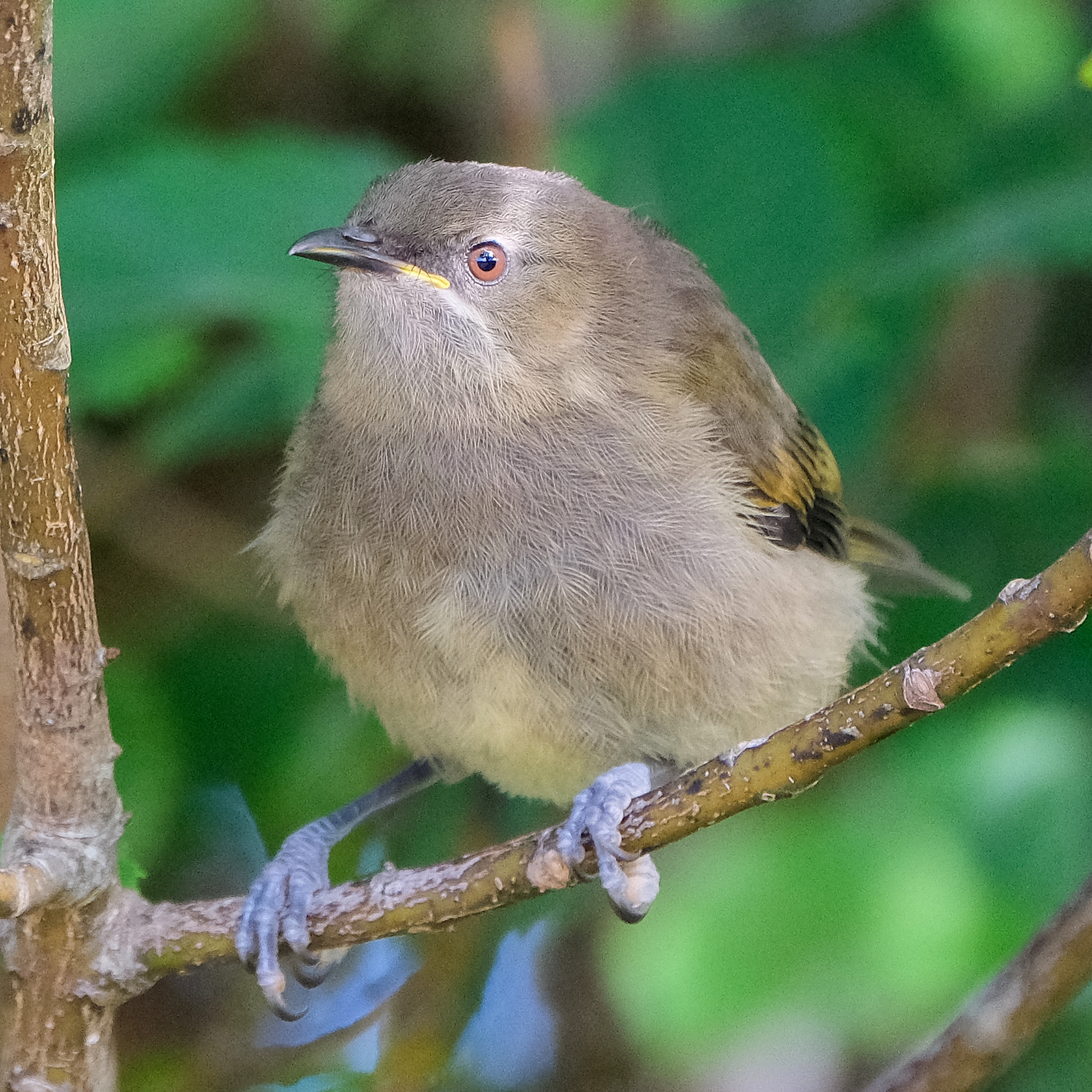
Bellbirds (Anthornis melanura) and other birds are frequent visitors of the flowers of M. umbellata.

The seeds of M. umbellata are tiny, and weigh less than 0.1 mg, hence why they are well-adapted to be dispersed by the wind. M. umbellata's seedlings have been discovered up to 270 m (890 ft) away from the closest trees that are capable of producing seeds, although it is highly likely that they can travel greater distances. The nectar-producing flowers of M. umbellata appear to be pollinated by and visited by numerous New Zealand native birds, these include the tūī (Prosthemadera novaeseelandiae), and bellbirds (Anthornis melanura). In the south-eastern corner of New Zealand, in an area known as The Catlins; M. umbellata is so frequently visited by kākā (Nestor meridionalis) in the area, a locality is now known as Kaka Point, which was a favoured location for kākā birds to visit M. umbellata individuals. In the Southern Alps, the kea (Nestor notabilis), a mountain parrot, is frequently observed to be perching on the flowers of M. umbellata. The flowers are also visited by honeybees (Apis mellifera). M. umbellata individuals are frequently browsed by introduced deer, pigs, cattle, goats, and also to a lesser extent, by wallabies.

Metrosideros umbellata plays host to the endemic New Zealand longhorn beetles Blosyropus spinosus, Didymocantha, and Prionoplus reticularis. Several moths use M. umbellata as a host, such as Pyrgotis plagiatana, Planotortrix excessana, and two species from the genera Declana and Selidosema.

=== Fungi ===
Metrosideros umbellata also plays host to numerous fungi species and pathogens. The pathology of New Zealand forest trees was studied by J. W. Glimour in 1966. In their revision of the Metrosideros genus and the species, Glimour recorded that Phellinus setulosus and Meliolina novae-zelandiae were observed as pathogens on M. umbellata. Another revision of the fungi associated with New Zealand's Metrosideros species was published in the New Zealand Journal of Botany in 1999, and found more fungi species associated with M. umbellata, which included some thirty other species that have confirmed by the study to be growing or to be hosted on M. umbellata. New Zealand mycologist G. H. Cunningham recorded two species of Polyporaceae and five species of Thelephoraceae as saprophytes on M. umbellata's bark and dead wood.

== Conservation ==
Although M. umbellata is regarded as "Not Threatened", it is uncommon in the North Island, and in certain areas it is particularly threatened by possum browsing. M. umbellata was evaluated in the most recent 2023 assessment by the New Zealand Threatened Classification System as "Not Threatened", the assessment was determined because the species has a large and stable population. Its assessment in the IUCN Redlist was evaluated in 2024 as "Least Concern", and its population trend was evaluated as "Unknown".

A 1988 article in the New Zealand Journal of Botany reported that possum browsing of the trees resulted in significant damage to the trees, such as defoliation, which can eventually kill the tree. Another threat to M. umbellata is myrtle rust (Austropuccinia psidii), which is an invasive species of fungus that infects numerous native species in the family Myrtaceae. A 2024 study suggested that communities in which M. umbellata is in are among the most vulnerable to myrtle rust infection. M. umbellata's 2017 assessment in the New Zealand Threat Classification System was raised to "Threatened – Nationally Vulnerable" due to the risk of infection from the fungus. A plant conservation initiative, called Project Crimson, aims to propagate and restore pōhutukawa and rātā in New Zealand.

== Relationship with humans ==
=== In Māori culture ===
Metrosideros umbellata had medicinal significance to pre-European Māori. The inner bark was used (similar to an antiseptic) to treat wounds, bruises, and bleedings. The leaves were chewed to heal toothaches. M. umbellata's nectar was traditionally digested to soothe sore throats, particularly in children. Other recorded uses of the tree for Māori included the making of clubs and fishing hooks.

=== In European culture ===
Metrosideros umbellata had multiple uses as timber to European settlers as well. The wood is compact, heavy, tough, and of great strength when straight in the grain. The timber has historically been used as a substitution for pōhutukawa in shipbuilding, knees, and crooks. It has also been used for carriages, trenails, wagons, and water-wheels. The timber has been used in the manufacture of agricultural implements and, to a smaller degree, for bridges, culverts, and other similar purposes. It has also been used for fencing, house blocks, and also provides an "excellent firewood", according to the New Zealand botanist Thomas Kirk. Metrosideros umbellata is easily cultivated, but it is of slow growth.

== See also ==
- List of trees native to New Zealand
