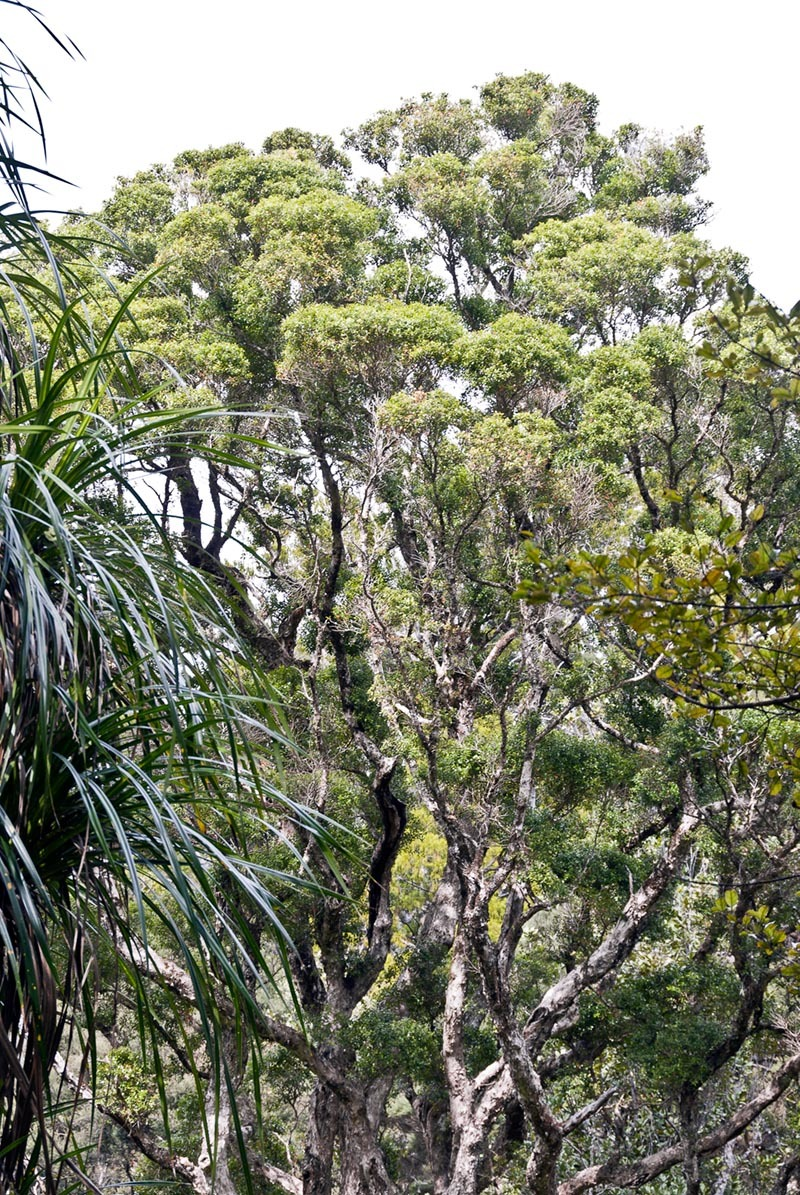
- Bartlett's rātā (centre) in Te Paki

Conservation status
- Critically Endangered (IUCN 3.1)

Scientific classification
- Kingdom: Plantae
- Clade: Tracheophytes
- Clade: Angiosperms
- Clade: Eudicots
- Clade: Rosids
- Order: Myrtales
- Family: Myrtaceae
- Genus: Metrosideros
- Species: M. bartlettii

Binomial name
- Metrosideros bartlettii J.W.Dawson
- Range in New Zealand

= Metrosideros bartlettii =

Species of flowering plant

Metrosideros bartlettii, commonly known as Bartlett's rātā, is a rare species of tree in the family Myrtaceae. It is endemic to the Northland Region in New Zealand's North Island. Bartlett's rātā reaches a height of up to 30 metres (100 feet) with a trunk of 1–1.5 metres (3 ft 3 in – 4 ft 11 in) in diameter. The species is classified in the subgenus Metrosideros and is known for its distinct whitish, paper-like bark and small white-coloured flowers. Bartlett's rātā was first discovered in 1975 by the New Zealand botanist and schoolteacher John Bartlett, who accidentally discovered the species while searching for liverworts near Cape Reinga. It was first described by botanist John Dawson in a 1985 article in the New Zealand Journal of Botany.

Bartlett's rātā's range covers the northern tip of the Aupōuri Peninsula, in three dense forest remnants near Piwhane / Spirits Bay. Bartlett's rātā typically begins life as an epiphyte (growing on another plant); it inhabits lowland forests and is usually found growing near wet areas. A 2018 article by the New Zealand Plant Conservation Network documented 13 adult trees in the wild, a significant decrease from another research article in 2000 that documented 31 wild adult trees. The species has a high chance of becoming extinct in the wild unless immediate conservation measures are taken to stop its ongoing decline, which has been attributed to land use changes following human settlement and the introduction of common brushtail possums, which browse its buds, flowers, and shoots. Bartlett's rātā's conservation status was assessed by the IUCN Red List in 2013 as critically endangered, and its population trend was assessed as decreasing.

== Description ==
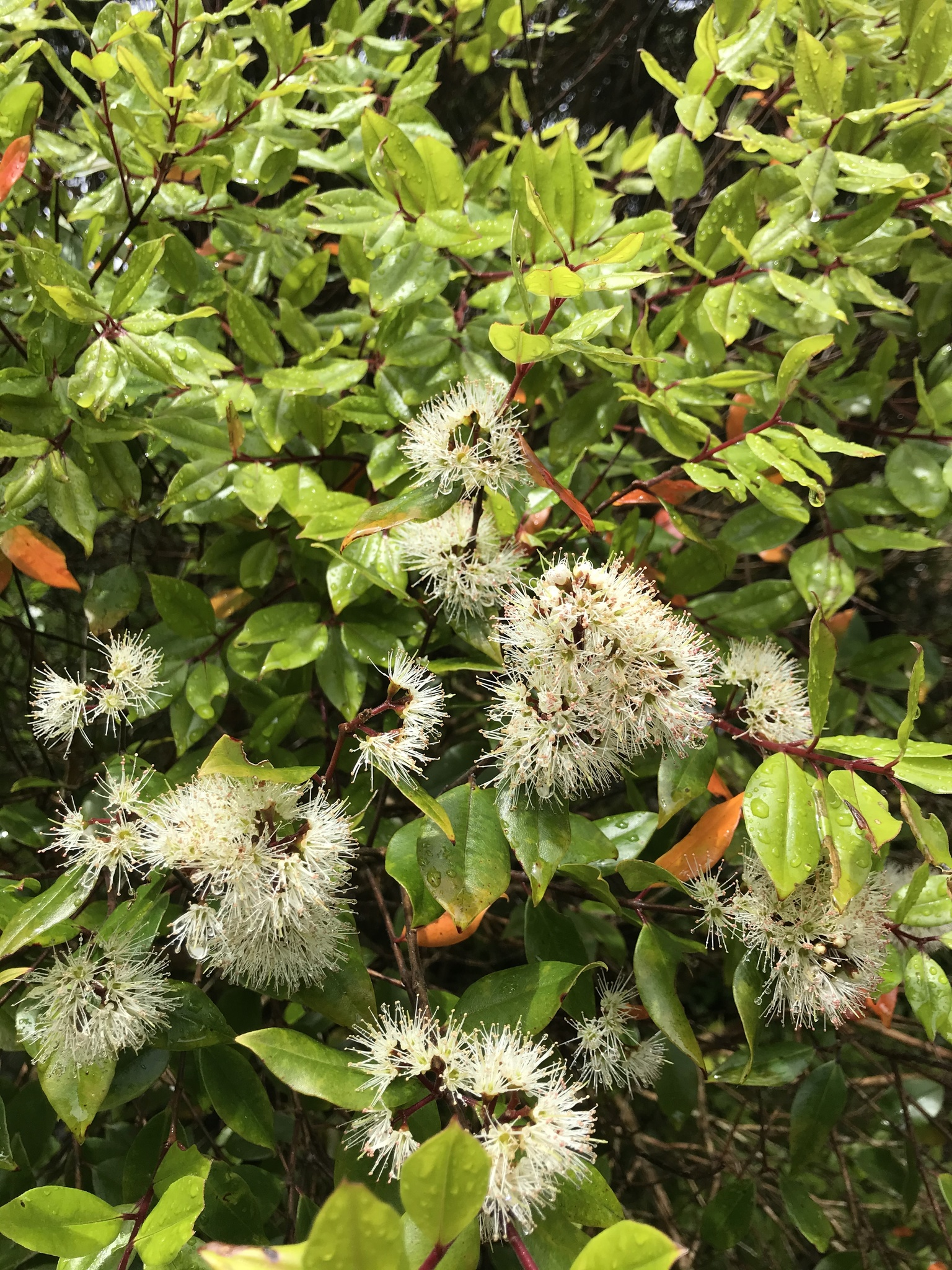
Foliage of Bartlett's rātā

Metrosideros bartlettii (Bartlett's rātā) is a tree in the family Myrtaceae, reaching a height of up to 30 metres (100 feet) with a trunk up to 1–1.5 m in diameter. Its bark is described as "papery" and is pale grey to whitish in colour, shedding freely, and separating into soft flakes. Its young twigs are often coloured dark red.

The leaves are chartaceous (paper-like) to coriaceous (leather-like) in character with laminae (leaf blades) that are 30–50 mm long × 15–23 mm wide. Young leaves are palish-green to yellow-green and become dark green as they mature. The leaves' upper surfaces are shiny, and their lower surfaces are glossy. There are 3–4 pairs of cymules (very small flowers) on an inflorescence (flower cluster) with densely spreading white hairs.

Compared to other species in the genus Metrosideros, the flowering of Bartlett's rātā is unpredictable, making it unlikely that its small population can regenerate naturally. Bartlett's rātā typically flowers in spring, from October to November; the species produces distinct white-coloured flowers with pedicels up to 3 × 1 mm and a hypanthium of up to 2.5–3 mm high × 2–2.5 mm wide. Its spreading sepals are triangle-shaped and are 1–1.5 × 1–1.5 mm long, and its petals are elliptical to egg-shaped and are 2.5–3 × 1.8–2 mm long. Its peduncles are 9 × 1 mm long. Its stamens are 5–9 mm long, and the styles are slightly longer at 10–11 mm long. Its petioles are 4–5 × 1 mm long.

From March to April, Bartlett's rātā produces small puberulent hypanthium fruits about 2.0–2.5 mm high × 2.5–3.0 mm wide, with persistent, deflexed (bent downwards) sepals and 1.5–2.5 mm long capsules. The pale orange-yellow seeds Bartlett's rātā produces are 2.3–3.0 mm long, narrowly elliptic to narrowly oval-shaped, and are straight or slightly curved.

The leaves of Bartlett's rātā have a size similar to northern rātā (M. robusta) and southern rātā (M. umbellata). The flowers of Bartlett's rātā are distinguished from those of northern rātā by their pure white colour and smaller size. Bartlett's rātā is also the only New Zealand species in the genus Metrosideros with such easily detachable and paper-like bark. Bartlett's rātā has a diploid chromosome count of 22.

== Taxonomy ==
=== Classification ===
- - - - - M. tremuloides
        - M. collina
        - M. polymorpha
        - M. waialealae
        - M. macropus
        - M. rugosa
      - - M. collina (Tahiti)
        - M. collina (Cook Islands)
        - M. collina (Rūrutu)
      - M. exclesa
      - M. nervulosa
      - M. kermadecensis
      - M. sclerocarpa
      - M. robusta
    - M. bartlettii

Cladogram depicting the phylogeny and relationships of selected species within the genus Metrosideros in the clade "Va".
East Polynesia (incl. Kermadec)
New Zealand (excl. Kermadec)

Metrosideros bartlettii is categorised in the subgenus Metrosideros within the genus Metrosideros, which consists of about 58 described species across Africa, Asia, Oceania and South America. The genus consists of two main subgenera: Metrosideros (trees) and Mearnsia (vines and shrubs). There are twelve known species of Metrosideros in New Zealand; the subgenus Metrosideros comprises five tree species, M. bartlettii, M. excelsa, M. kermadecensis, M. robusta, and M. umbellata; the other superseded subgenus, Mearnsia, comprises six vine species and one shrub, M. albiflora, M. carminea, M. colensoi, M. diffusa, M. fulgens, M. perforata, and M. parkinsonii.

In 2021, a cladistic analysis from Austral Ecology of the genus Metrosideros, indicated a dispersal and radiation of the Metrosideros subgenus from New Zealand to Polynesia, Lord Howe Island and the Kermadec Islands. Their analysis, using rDNA sequencing, suggested the phylogenetic relationships within this subclade suggested a separate dispersal route into East Polynesia, including "an apparent step" from the Marquesas Islands to Hawaii. Metrosideros bartlettii and its related species are categorised in the clade (group) "Va". This clade includes two of its closest New Zealand relatives, M. excelsa and M. robusta, as well as various species from East Polynesia (including Hawaii), Lord Howe Island and the Kermadec Islands.

=== History ===
Bartlett's rātā was accidentally discovered in 1975 by the New Zealand botanist and schoolteacher John Bartlett while searching for liverworts near Cape Reinga. He came across the species growing at the base of a large tree in Radar Bush, near Cape Reinga. Bartlett realised it was a new species of rātā but was unable to reach any of the branches, so he instead took fragments of the bark to botanist John Dawson of the Victoria University of Wellington. Dawson thought the find was northern rātā, but Bartlett believed it was a new species, so he later returned to the area where he found the species and was able to collect a branch by shooting one off with his rifle. He then took the branch back to Wellington.

Dawson described the new species in a 1985 article in the New Zealand Journal of Botany, noting it had a "distinct whitish, spongy bark and small white flowers" and when flowers of Bartlett's rātā were first collected in 1984, it was clear to him that "a new species was involved". The examined type material for the article was collected in July 1978 by John Bartlett in Radar Bush and the isotype was collected in November 1984 by Nigel Culnie near Spirits Bay Road. (Note: An image of the herbarium specimen (isotype) can be found in the "Museum of New Zealand Te Papa Tongarewa" link located here.)

=== Etymology ===
The etymology (word origin) of Bartlett's rātā's genus Metrosideros translates to English from Greek as 'iron-heart': the word metra means 'core' or 'heart', and sideron means 'iron', alluding to the timber's iron-like strength. The specific epithet (second part of the scientific name), bartlettii, is named after the species' discoverer, John Bartlett. The species is commonly known as 'Bartlett's rātā' and 'rātā Moehau'; a name originating from the Māori language. (Note: 'Moehau' is the name of a traditional ancestor and should therefore be capitalised. However, some sources do not capitalise it.) Bartlett's rātā's Māori name was given by Ngāti Kurī elders in 1975 in honour of Moehau, an important ancestor for the Ngāti Kurī iwi (tribe).

== Ecology ==
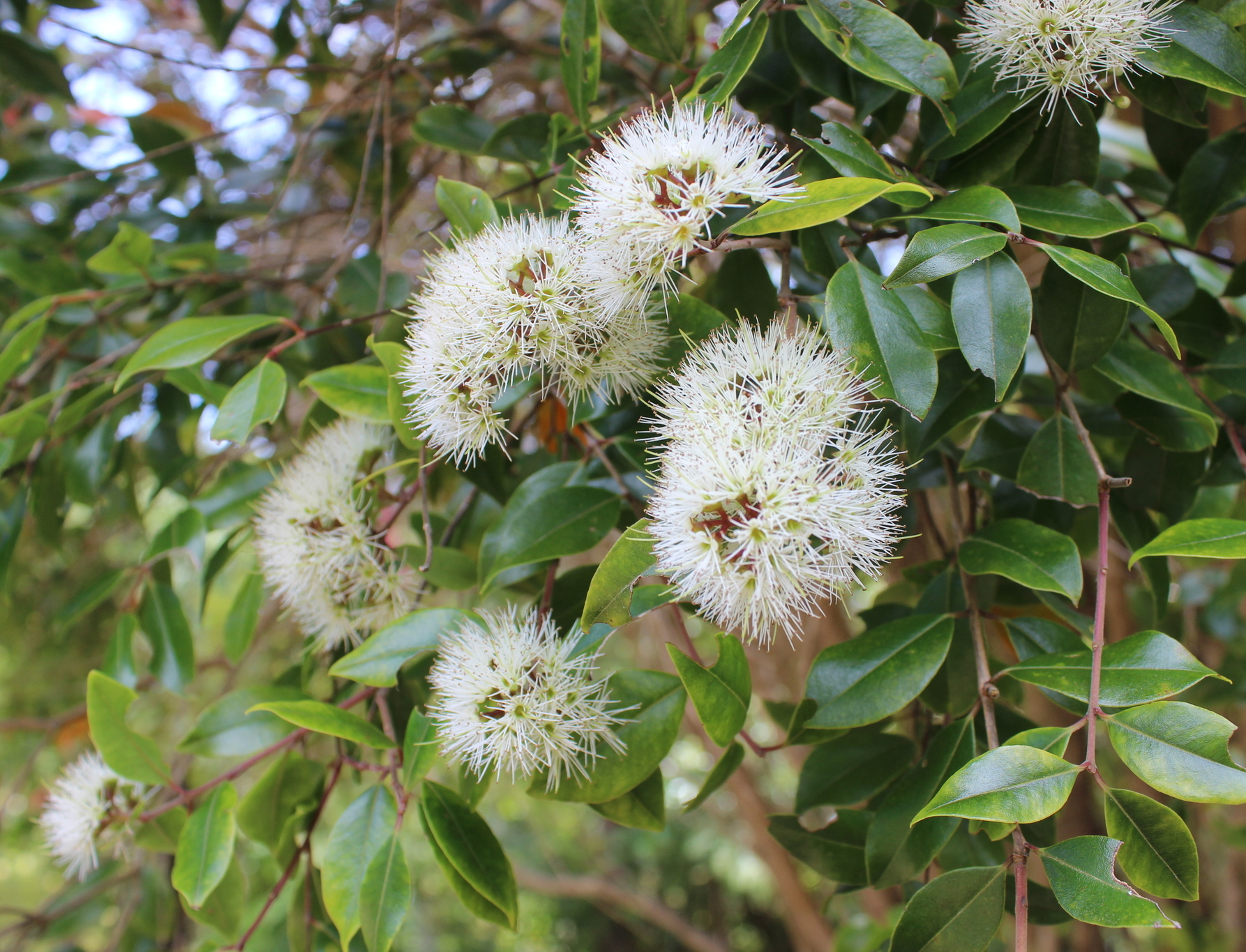
Bartlett's rātā's white-coloured flowers are frequently visited by birds and insects.

The flowers of Bartlett's rātā are observed to be frequently visited by birds and insects (such as bees and flies), which may help spread pollen to Bartlett's rātā from other nearby Metrosideros individuals. Despite this, it is unclear what the primary pollinators of Bartlett's rātā are. Introduced species are known to visit Metrosideros in a manner similar to native species. This could be due to the inherent vulnerability of biotas on isolated oceanic islands to disruption by introduced species.

In 2018, two New Zealand botanists, Carlos Lehnebach and Karin van der Walt, examined the pollination and the flower development of Bartlett's rātā. In their study, published in the New Zealand Plant Conservation Network, they found that Bartlett's rātā is a self-incompatible tree, meaning that its flowers will only seed if it is pollinated by pollen from a genetically distinct tree. In 2021, the New Zealand Journal of Botany published a similar study in which researchers and scientists analysed the ex situ conservation of Bartlett's rātā individuals at Ōtari-Wilton's Bush. Their analyses confirmed the self-incompatibility of Bartlett's rātā, which is consistent with other species within the genus Metrosideros. Although it was speculated that self-incompatibility occurred in Bartlett's rātā, it had never been experimentally confirmed until these two studies. (Note: The two researchers from the 2018 study, Carlos Lehnebach and Karin van der Walt, were also involved in the 2021 research article in the New Zealand Journal of Botany, together with Jayanthi Nadarajan, Hassan Saeiahagh and Ranjith Pathirana.) In their 2021 analyses, hand-pollination of Bartlett's rātā individuals produced seeds with generally low germination rates; this biological finding is consistent with other species in the family Myrtaceae, such as pōhutukawa and mānuka (Leptospermum scoparium). Their analyses also confirmed that hybridisation between Bartlett's rātā and pōhutukawa resulted in capsule formations; however, the seeds from their analyses had very low viability.

A 2022 research article on the cross-pollination of cultivated Bartlett's rātā individuals, published in the Pacific Conservation Biology, revealed that cross-pollination is the only viable method that produces seeds that can be used in naturalised populations. The research article also revealed that the flower development of Bartlett's rātā is characterised by dichogamy, which is a method to prevent self-pollination by having stigma receptivity and release of pollen occur sequentially, i.e., not at the same time. Their study found that Bartlett's rātā's breeding strategy favours cross-pollination and has very little inbreeding.

The endemic liverwort species Frullania wairua and Siphonolejeunea raharahanehemiae, both at risk of extinction, are known to be hosted by Bartlett's rātā. Anthracophyllum archeri, a species of fungus in the family Omphalotaceae and other fungi in the genus Cladobotryum, were also observed to be growing on the bark and the fallen twigs of Bartlett's rātā in native forest in Te Paki, Northland.

== Distribution ==
Bartlett's rātā is endemic to the Northland Region in New Zealand's North Island. Its range covers the northern tip of the Aupōuri Peninsula, in three patches of dense forest remnants near Piwhane / Spirits Bay, these being: Kohuronaki Bush, Radar Bush, and Unuwhao Bush. At the time of the original species description in 1985, only seven naturalised adult individuals were known to be located at two of the sites. Later in the mid-1990s, New Zealand's Department of Conservation recorded nineteen adult individuals. Then, a 2000 research article of Bartlett's rātā, published in Molecular Ecology, revealed an additional twelve adult individuals, bringing the known species count of Bartlett's rātā to thirty-one in the year 2000.

Before a DNA profiling test of Bartlett's rātā individuals was conducted in 2015, the Department of Conservation was unaware that three of the five genotypes required to grow genetically suitable trees were located within the tribal territories of the Ngāti Kurī and Te Aupōuri iwi. At most, five of the fourteen trees in 2015 possessed the unique genotypes required for the genetic diversity, which is essential to the species' existence. New Zealand botanist and science advisor Peter de Lange stated that without intervention "the future was bleak" for Bartlett's rātā. The 2018 article by Lehnebach and Van der Walt, published by the New Zealand Plant Conservation Network, has since reported only thirteen adult trees in the wild.

=== Habitat ===
Bartlett's rātā is usually found growing near bodies of water, such as streams and swamps. Bartlett's rātā's habitat favours dense lowland forests; the plant usually germinates and begins life as an epiphyte (growing on another plant), specimens have been observed growing on: pūriri (Vitex lucens), rewarewa (Knightia excelsa), taraire (Beilschmiedia tarairi), and tree ferns (Cyathea). Bartlett's rātā have occasionally been observed growing on boulders, cliff sides, and rock outcrops.

== Conservation ==
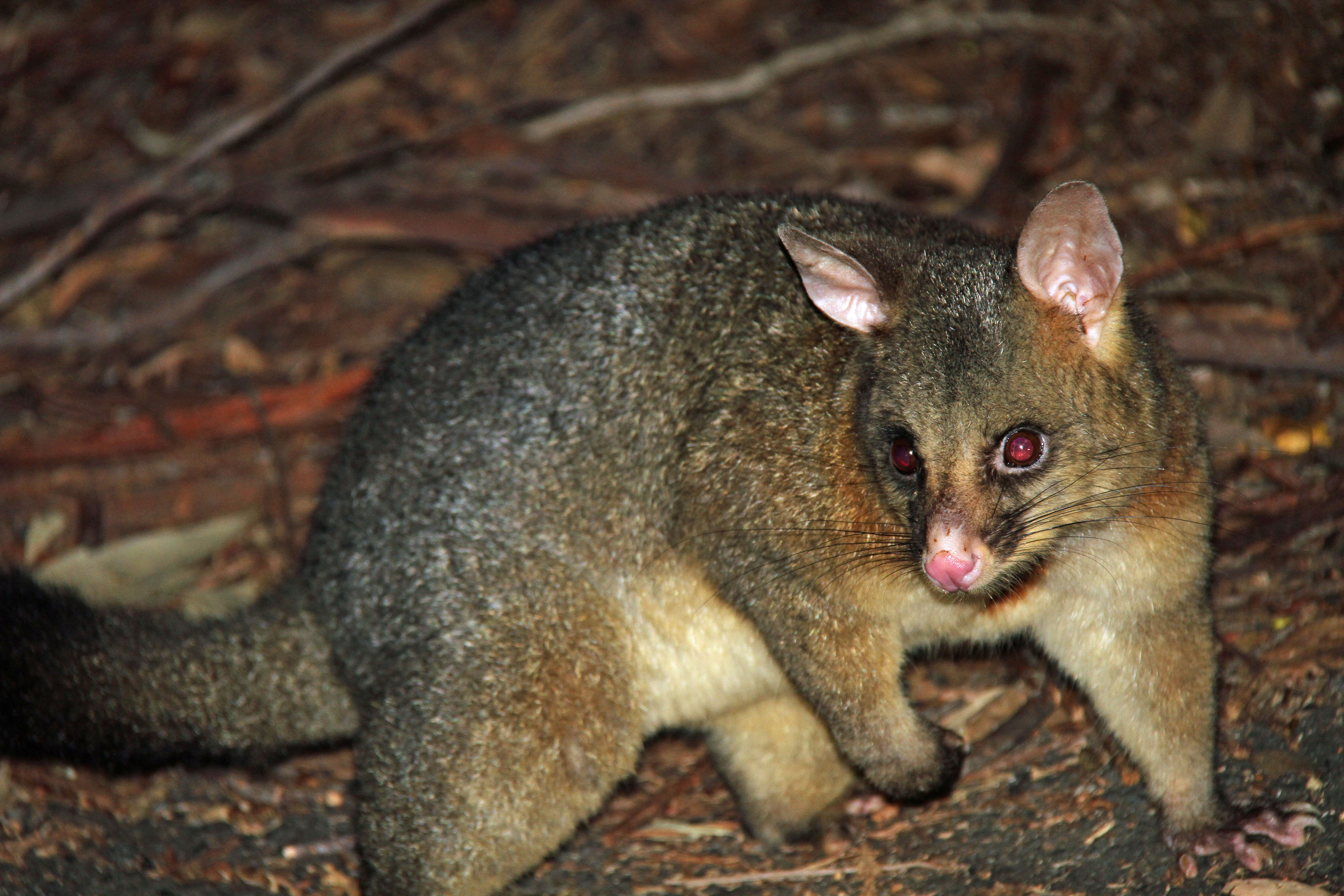
The introduction of common brushtail possums is one cause of the historical decline of Bartlett's rātā.

Bartlett's rātā is one of New Zealand's most threatened and rarest trees. Its conservation status was assessed by the IUCN Red List in 2013 as critically endangered, and its population trend was evaluated as decreasing. Its assessment in the New Zealand Threat Classification System was evaluated in 2023 as nationally critical. The decline of Bartlett's rātā is attributed to land use changes following human settlement and the introduction of common brushtail possums, an invasive species in New Zealand, which browse its buds, flowers, and shoots. Another threat to Bartlett's rātā is myrtle rust, a type of plant disease that infects many species in the family Myrtaceae, including Bartlett's rātā. Although Bartlett's rātā is uncommon in the wild, it is common in cultivation and is found in several private and botanic gardens across the country.

The habitat disturbance of Bartlett's rātā began with the arrival of the first human settlers from East Polynesia in c. 1250 – 1300 CE. Later in the 1800s, New Zealand experienced the arrival of European settlers, who cleared many forests, contributing to the habitat disturbance of Bartlett's rātā. Although the forests in Northland are gradually recovering, the population of Bartlett's rātā remains low and is scattered between three known locations near Piwhane / Spirits Bay.

Unless immediate conservation measures are taken, Bartlett's rātā has a high chance of becoming extinct due to its ongoing decline, small population size, and reproductive failure. In 2020, the Ngāti Kurī iwi established a planting programme in collaboration with Manaaki Whenua – Landcare Research with the aim of increasing and protecting the number of Bartlett's rātā trees remaining in the wild. As of January 2024, there has been over five hundred new plantings of Bartlett's rātā in Cape Reinga. The programme aims to increase the number of individuals to four thousand.

== See also ==
- List of trees native to New Zealand
