= Metrosideros florida =

Metrosideros florida may refer to:

- Metrosideros florida Sm., now considered a synonym of Metrosideros fulgens Sol. ex Gaertn
- Metrosideros florida Hook.f., now considered a synonym of Metrosideros robusta A.Cunn.
