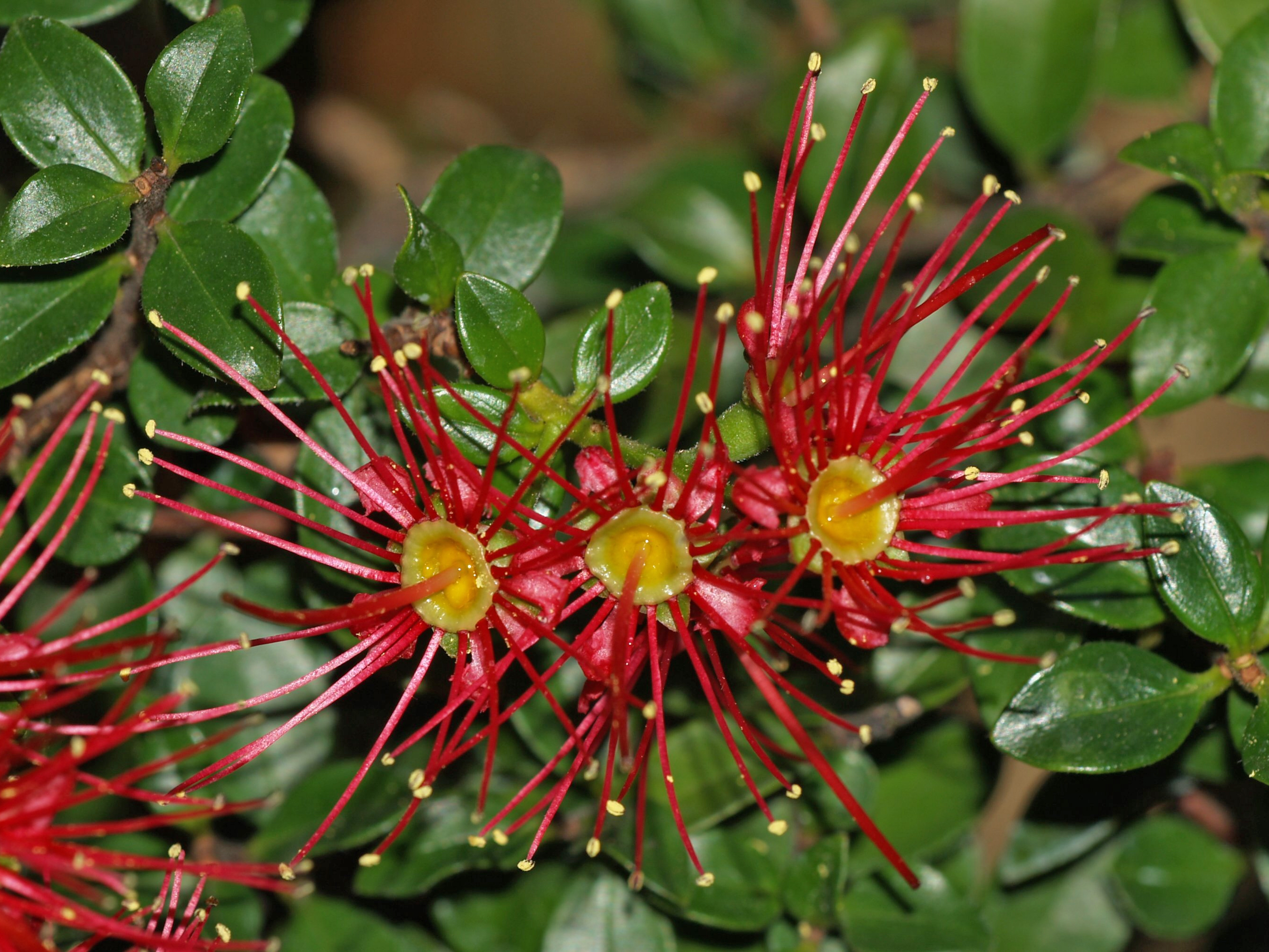
- Metrosideros carminea produces carmine-red flowers in spring

Scientific classification
- Kingdom: Plantae
- Clade: Tracheophytes
- Clade: Angiosperms
- Clade: Eudicots
- Clade: Rosids
- Order: Myrtales
- Family: Myrtaceae
- Genus: Metrosideros
- Species: M. carminea

Binomial name
- Metrosideros carminea W.R.B.Oliv.

= Metrosideros carminea =

Species of vine

Metrosideros carminea (Carmine rātā, Crimson rātā or in Māori akakura) is a forest liane or vine that is endemic to New Zealand. It occurs in coastal and lowland forest from Te Paki in the north of the North Island south to Māhia Peninsula and Taranaki. It is one of a number of New Zealand Metrosideros species which live out their lives as vines, unlike the northern rātā (M.robusta), which generally begins as a hemi-epiphyte and grows into a huge tree.

== Description ==
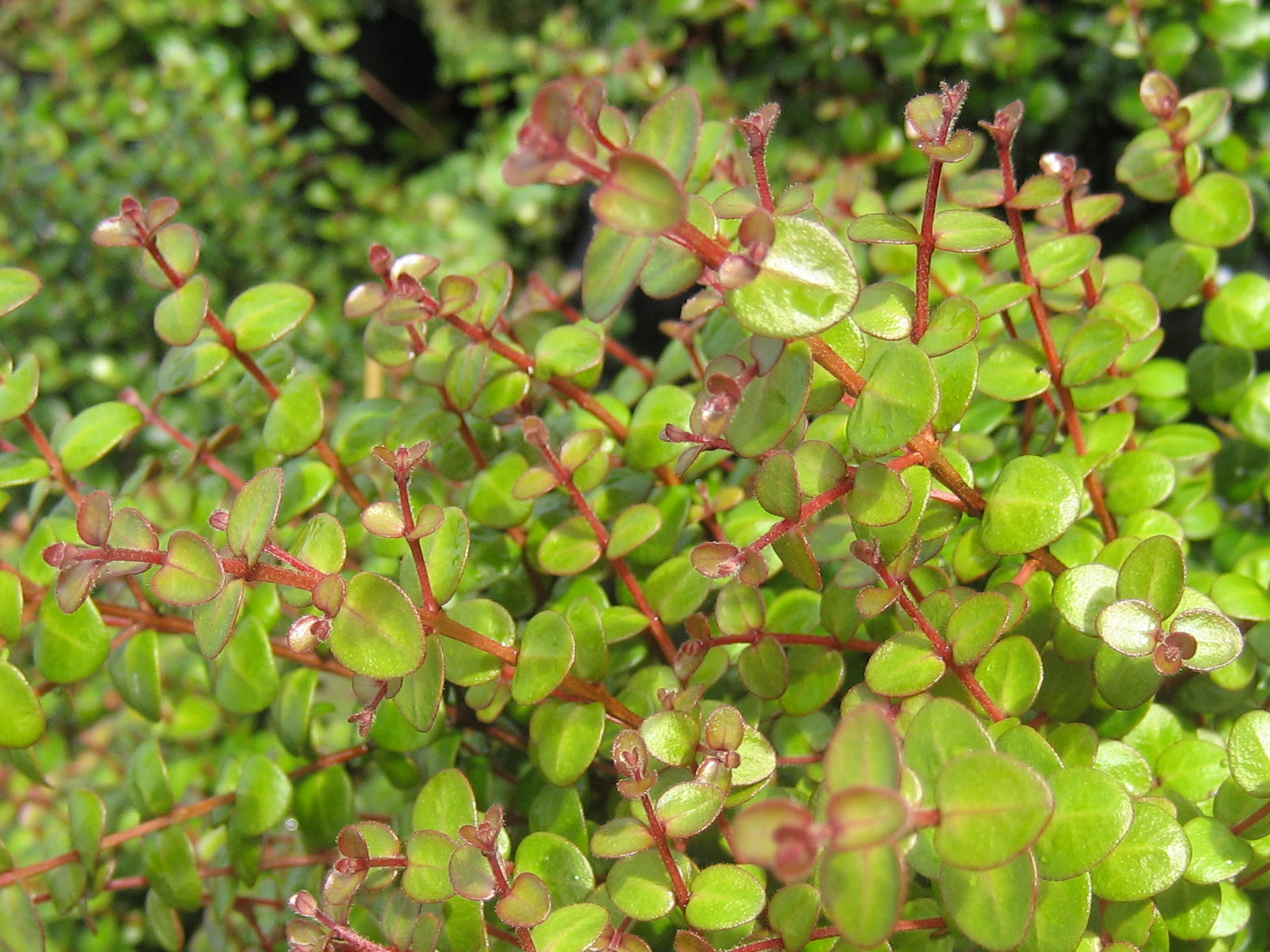
Leaves and stems of a young specimen of M. carminea

Metrosideros carminea prefers warm moist habitats and grows up to 15 metres (49 feet). long or more, with the main stem several centimetres in diameter. The small, glossy, pointed leaves are thick, and often widest in the middle. The small rounded and shiny deep-green leaves have are borne on reddish new stems. Carmine rātā flowers from late winter to mid-spring, and has vibrant displays of bright red flowers in groups at the ends of the stems. The seed capsules ripen between late spring and early autumn. It climbs in the same way as ivy, sending out short adventitious roots to adhere to the trunks of host trees, penetrating and clinging to rough surfaces. The climbing shoots of juvenile plants grow rapidly and quickly extend the length of the plant. The short clinging roots usually die after about a year, so that when the vine is mature, the thick, twisted, rope-like stems hang free from the host like thick ropes.

== Cultivation ==
This species of climbing rātā is often cultivated for its bright flowers that appear in the early spring. It is generally available from most retail nurseries in New Zealand, although most plants sold are from adult cuttings which grow into shrubs rather than climbers. Carmine Rata prefers a moist semi-shady position, sheltered from frost. There are several cultivars of M. carminea. Metrosideros ‘Red Carpet’ flowers freely in October (late spring in New Zealand). Another cultivar, Metrosideros ' Carousel' is an attractive dwarf shrub useful as a groundcover, having glossy lime-green leaves with broad gold margins and small carmine-red flowers in spring. It grows to 80 cm. Metrosideros 'Ferris Wheel' has glossy deep green leaves. It bears bright carmine red flowers with golden stamens through spring. It grows to 90 cm (35 in).

Generally, only seedling plants will behave as climbers. Those propagated vegetatively from mature plants, typically by cuttings or layering, usually develop into small shrubs or groundcovers. That is why the cultivars described above are not climbers.

== See also ==
- Colenso's tātā
- Large white tātā
- Scarlet rātā
- Small white rātā
- White rātā
