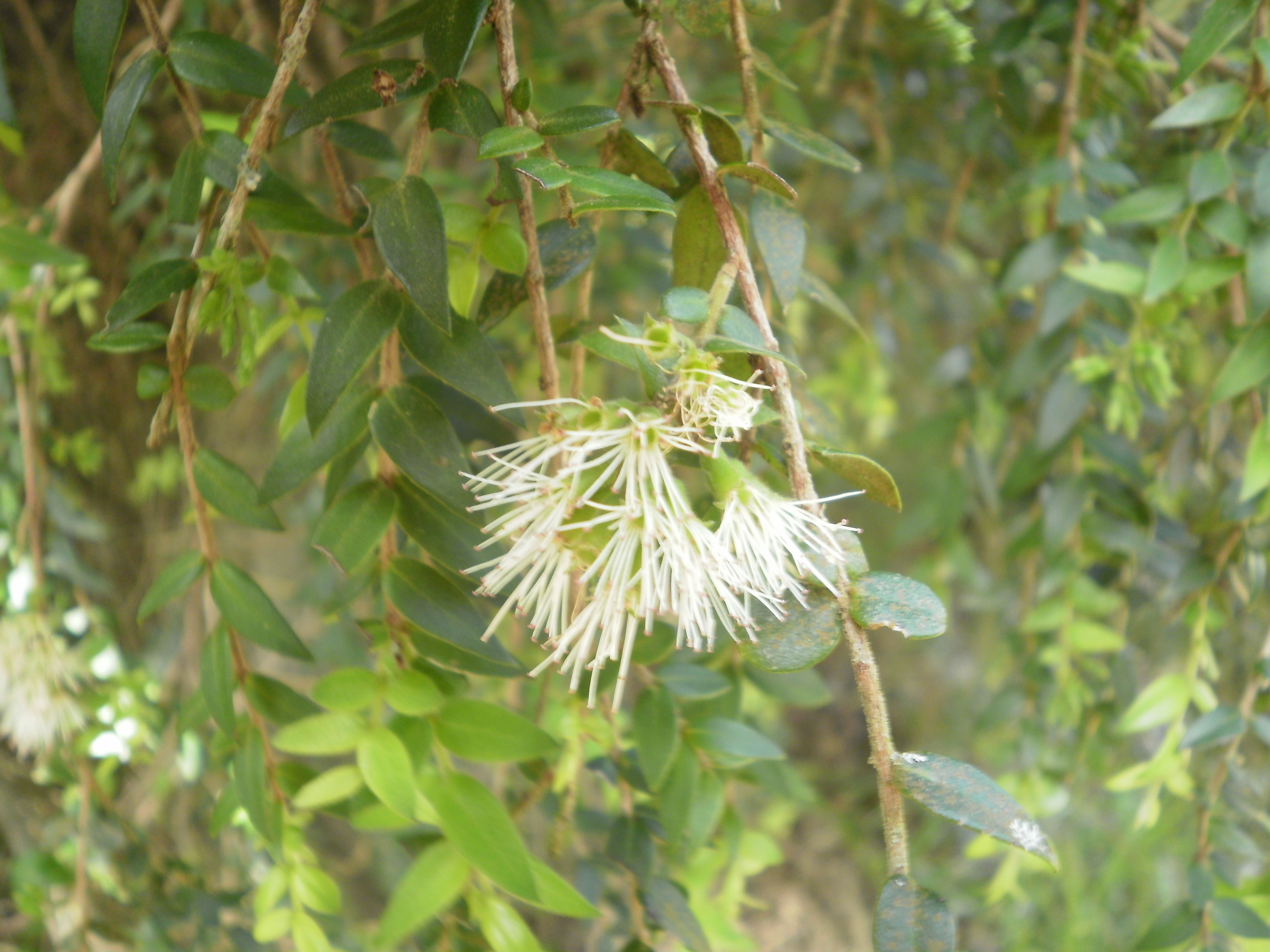
- Colenso's rātā flowering in Carter Scenic Reserve, Carterton, New Zealand

Scientific classification
- Kingdom: Plantae
- Clade: Tracheophytes
- Clade: Angiosperms
- Clade: Eudicots
- Clade: Rosids
- Order: Myrtales
- Family: Myrtaceae
- Genus: Metrosideros
- Species: M. colensoi

Binomial name
- Metrosideros colensoi Hook.f.

Synonyms
- Nania colensoi (Hook.f.) Kuntze; Metrosideros pendens Colenso. Metrosideros colensoi var. colensoi Hook.f. Metrosideros colensoi var. pendens (Colenso) Kirk

= Metrosideros colensoi =

Colenso's rātā

Species of vine endemic to New Zealand

Metrosideros colensoi, the climbing rata or Colenso's rātā, is a forest liane or vine that is endemic to New Zealand. It is one of a number of New Zealand Metrosideros species which live out their lives as vines, unlike the northern rātā (M. robusta), which generally begins as a hemi-epiphyte before growing into a huge tree. It grows to around 6 metres in height and bears clusters of pink or white flowers. It is unusual amongst New Zealand's metrosideros species in that its branches display a weeping habit, forming a 'hanging curtain' appearance. Its name commemorates William Colenso, a Cornish Christian missionary who was a botanist, explorer, printer, and politician.

== Description ==
The flowers of Colenso's rātā are either white or pale pink, and flowering is usually from November until January. Foliage is a dark green colour, with new years growth appearing in a contrasting lighter green. It is usual to find the vine form of rātā climbing up other forest trees, however Colenso's rātā is also partial to limestone cliff faces where it can climb cliffs relatively undisturbed. It is found within lowland forest as far south as Greymouth and Kaikōura.

== Conservation ==
As of 2012, Metrosideros colensoi is not regarded as threatened.

== Cultivation ==
Metrosideros colensoi is a notable plant in cultivation, but considerably undervalued. However, it is in several ways superior to more commonly grown species, such as Metrosideros carminea, on account of the ordered appearance of its growth form, and the 'movement' conveyed by its downward arching branches.

== See also ==
- Carmine/Crimson Rātā
- Large White Rātā
- Scarlet Rātā
- Small White Rātā
- White Rātā
