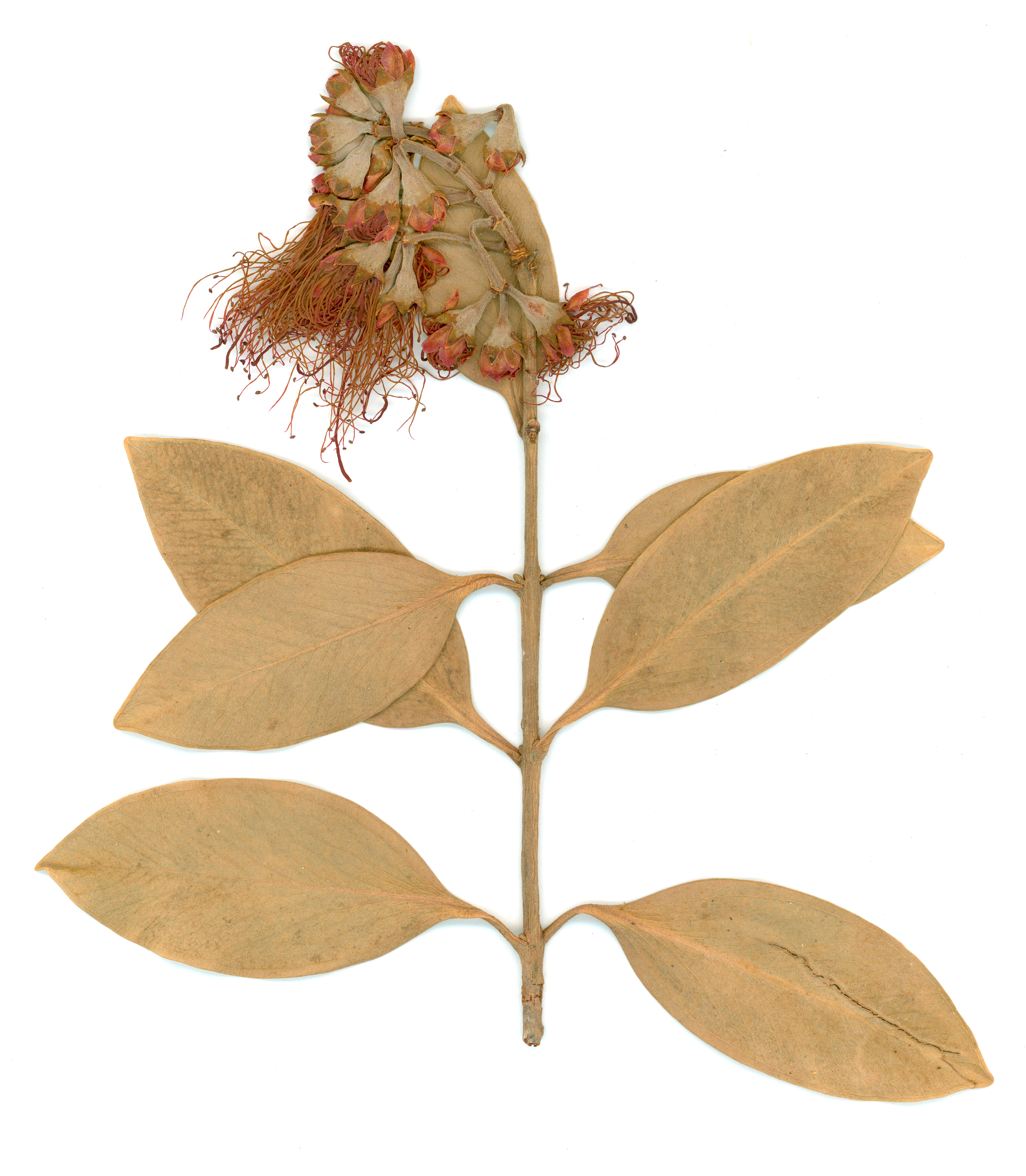
- Herbarium specimen

Scientific classification
- Kingdom: Plantae
- Clade: Tracheophytes
- Clade: Angiosperms
- Clade: Eudicots
- Clade: Rosids
- Order: Myrtales
- Family: Myrtaceae
- Genus: Metrosideros
- Species: M. sclerocarpa

Binomial name
- Metrosideros sclerocarpa J.W.Dawson (1990)

= Metrosideros sclerocarpa =

Species of flowering plant

Metrosideros sclerocarpa, commonly known as the mountain rose, is a flowering plant in the family Myrtaceae. It is endemic to Lord Howe Island.

== Description ==
It is a small tree, growing to 10 metres (33 feet) in height. The leathery ovate to elliptic leaves are 30–65 mm long and 17–32 mm wide. The bright red brush-like flowers have filaments 15–20 mm long. The fruits are 6–7 mm long. The flowering season is from December to February.

== Distribution and habitat ==
The plant is endemic to Australia's subtropical Lord Howe Island in the Tasman Sea. It occurs mainly near watercourses, below an elevation of about 300 m, in the southern mountains of the island.

== See also ==
- Metrosideros nervulosa – a similar and closely related plant also endemic to Lord Howe, also known as "mountain rose", differentiated by altitudinal range
