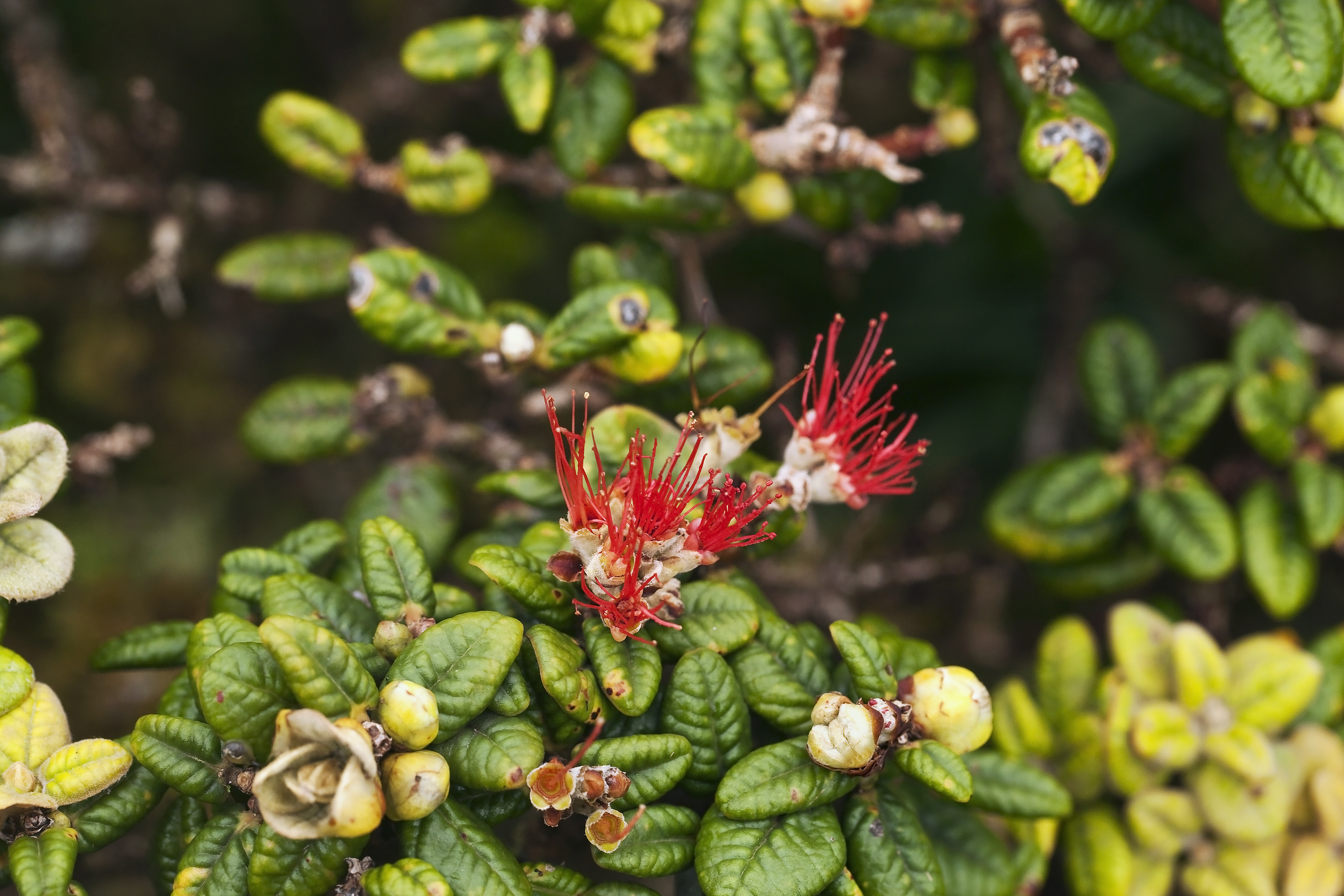
- Lehua papa tree

Conservation status
- Endangered (IUCN 3.1)

Scientific classification
- Kingdom: Plantae
- Clade: Tracheophytes
- Clade: Angiosperms
- Clade: Eudicots
- Clade: Rosids
- Order: Myrtales
- Family: Myrtaceae
- Genus: Metrosideros
- Species: M. rugosa

Binomial name
- Metrosideros rugosa A.Gray

= Metrosideros rugosa =

Species of plant

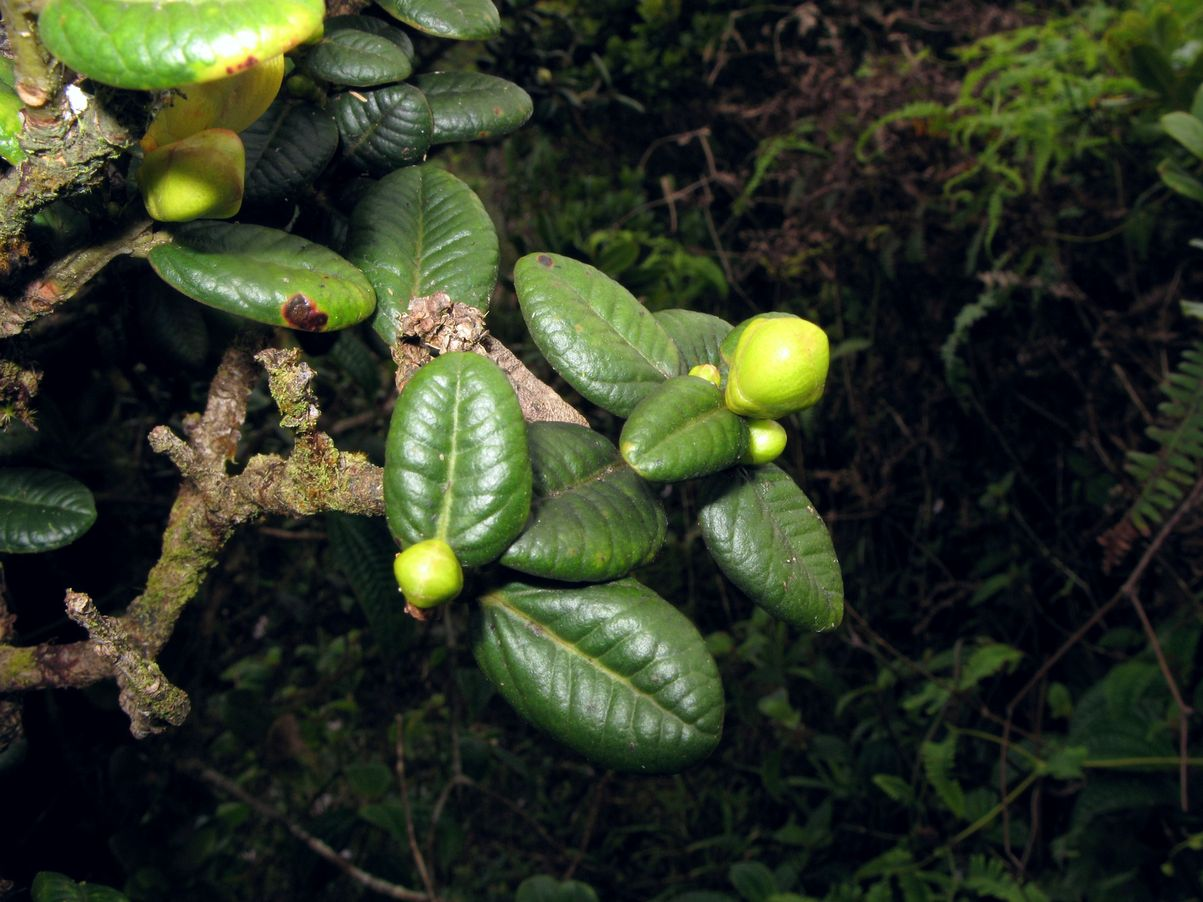
M. rugosa leaves showing the indented veins.

Metrosideros rugosa, commonly known as the lehua papa, is a tree of the myrtle family which is endemic to the island of Oʻahu in the Hawaiian Islands.

It is closely related to the widespread and highly variable ʻōhiʻa lehua (Metrosideros polymorpha), found throughout the islands. Lehua papa, however, is restricted to a narrow habitat range at the summits of very wet, windswept ridges and cliffs in the Koʻolau mountains.

It is distinguished from M. polymorpha by having the upper surface of the leaves with the veins deeply indented, and the leaf margins partly rolled (the latter is also found in some M. polymorpha varieties). It is also of rather distinctive appearance, with a compact shape suited to its windy habitats. Metrosideros rugosa has red flowers.
