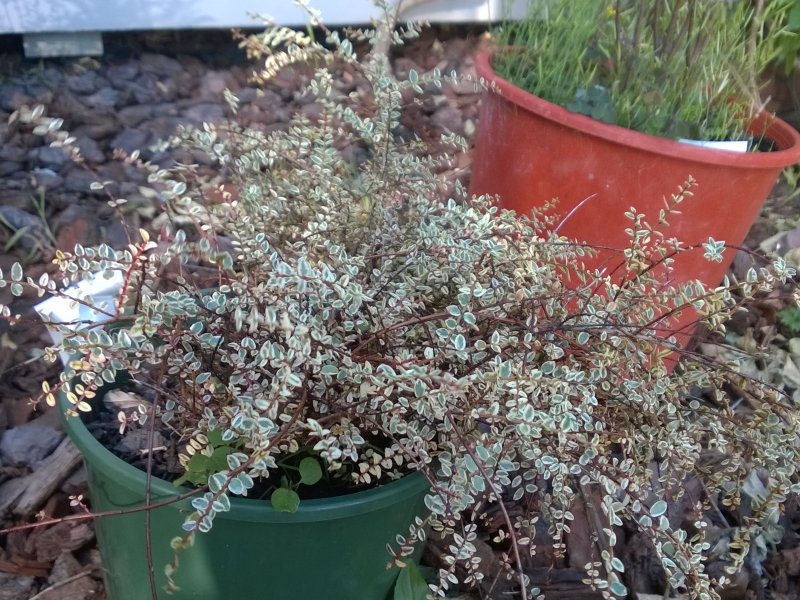
- Metrosideros diffusa in cultivation 'Crystal Showers'

Scientific classification
- Kingdom: Plantae
- Clade: Tracheophytes
- Clade: Angiosperms
- Clade: Eudicots
- Clade: Rosids
- Order: Myrtales
- Family: Myrtaceae
- Genus: Metrosideros
- Species: M. diffusa

Binomial name
- Metrosideros diffusa Sol. ex Gaertn.

Synonyms
- Melaleuca diffusa (G.Forst.); Metrosideros homeana (Turcz. ex Hook.f.); Metrosideros myrtifolia (Sol. ex Gaertn.); Metrosideros subsimilis (Colenso); Nania diffusa (G.Forst.) Kuntze; Nania hypericifolia (A.Cunn.) Kuntze

= Metrosideros diffusa =

Species of vine

Metrosideros diffusa, the white rātā, climbing rātā or in Māori akakura, is a forest liane or vine endemic to New Zealand. It is one of a number of New Zealand Metrosideros species which live out their lives as vines, unlike the northern rātā (M.robusta), which generally begins as a hemi-epiphyte and grows into a huge tree. It is one of three white flowering rātā vines (the others being large white rātā and small white rātā). White rātā is the most common climbing rātā in the wild, found naturally in lowland forests throughout the North, South and Stewart islands.

== Description ==
Metrosideros diffusa climbs to 6 metres (20 feet) tall and has small shiny leaves up to 2 cm (0.79 in) or more. The leaves are mostly rounded at the tip. Flowering is from mid-spring to early summer, with white or pale pink flowers.

== Cultivation ==
Metrosideros diffusa is not widely grown in cultivation, but is available from specialist native plant nurseries within New Zealand. In addition there is one known cultivar, Metrosideros diffusa 'Crystal Showers' sold by Blue Mountain Nurseries in Tapanui. This is a slow growing groundcover with white flowers but cream and green variegated foliage.

== See also ==
- Carmine/crimson rātā
- Colenso's rātā
- Large white rātā
- Scarlet rātā
- Small white rātā
