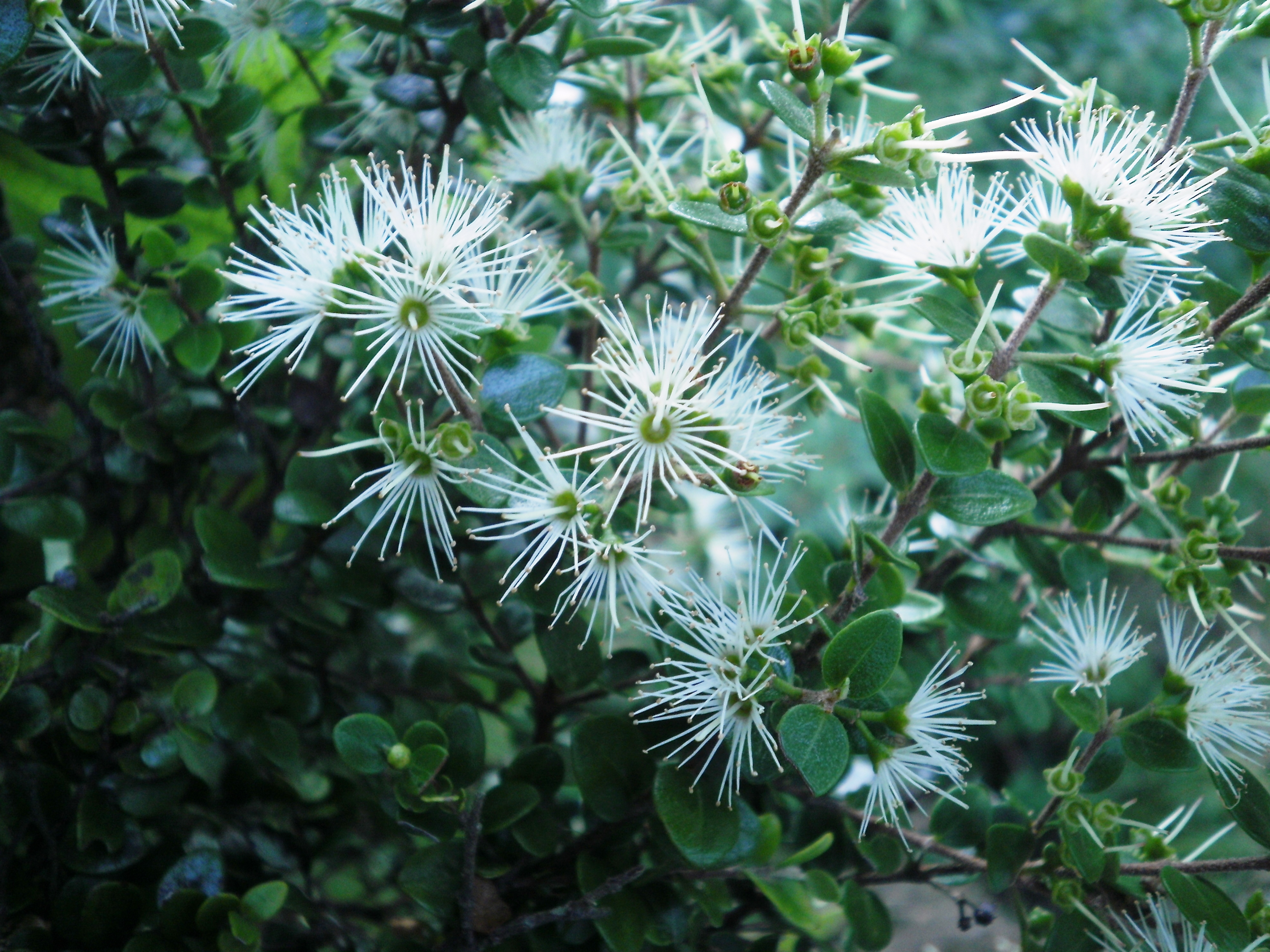
- M. perforata, near Hutt River

Scientific classification
- Kingdom: Plantae
- Clade: Tracheophytes
- Clade: Angiosperms
- Clade: Eudicots
- Clade: Rosids
- Order: Myrtales
- Family: Myrtaceae
- Genus: Metrosideros
- Species: M. perforata

Binomial name
- Metrosideros perforata (J.R.Forst. & G.Forst.) Druce

Synonyms
- Leptospermum perforatum J.R.Forst. & G.Forst. Melaleuca perforata (J.R.Forst. & G.Forst.) G.Forst. Metrosideros scandens Sol. ex Gaertn. Metrosideros tenuifolia Colenso; Metrosideros vesiculata Colenso

= Metrosideros perforata =

Species of vine endemic to New Zealand

Metrosideros perforata, commonly known as white rātā, climbing rātā, akatea or akatorotoro, is one of twelve Metrosideros species endemic to New Zealand. It is one of three white flowering rātā vines (the others being large white rātā and white rātā).

An example of a specific location of occurrence is within New Zealand's Hamilton Ecological District in association with such alliant understory plants as Blechnum discolor, Blechnum filiforme and Doodia media.

== See also ==
- Carmine/crimson rātā
- Colenso's rātā
- Large white rātā
- Scarlet rātā
- White rātā
