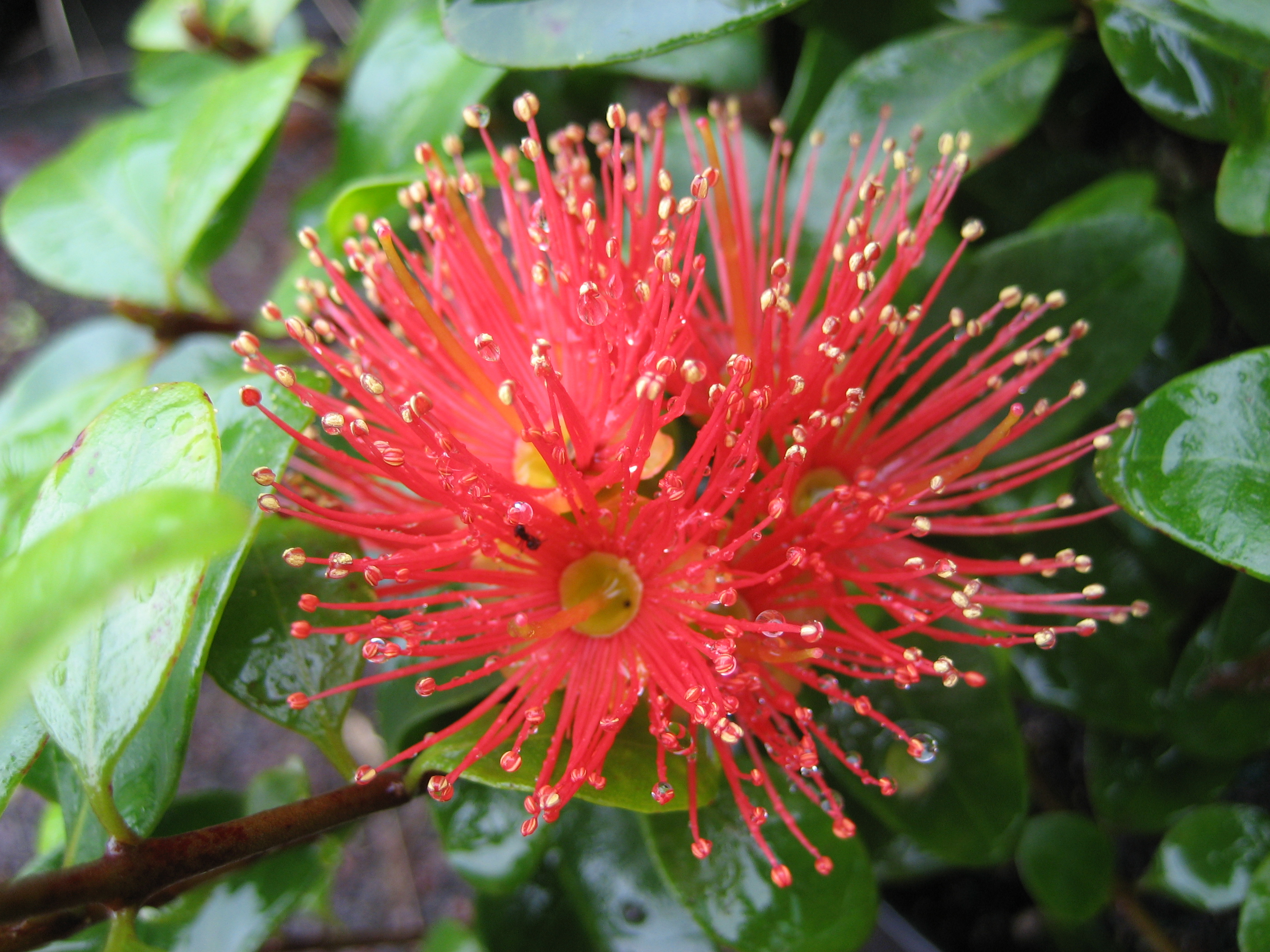
- Metrosideros fulgens produces brilliant red flowers in winter

Scientific classification
- Kingdom: Plantae
- Clade: Tracheophytes
- Clade: Angiosperms
- Clade: Eudicots
- Clade: Rosids
- Order: Myrtales
- Family: Myrtaceae
- Genus: Metrosideros
- Species: M. fulgens

Binomial name
- Metrosideros fulgens Sol. ex Gaertn.

Synonyms
- Metrosideros scandens (J.R.Forst. & G.Forst.); Metrosideros aurata (Colenso); Leptospermum scandens (J.R.Forst. & G.Forst.); Metrosideros florida (Sm.); Nania florida ((Sm.) Kuntze); Nania scandens (J.R.Forst. & G.Forst.) Kuntze

= Metrosideros fulgens =

Species of vine

Metrosideros fulgens (scarlet rātā, rātā vine or in Māori akatawhiwhi) is a forest liana or vine endemic to New Zealand. It occurs in coastal and lowland forest throughout the North Island, on the west coast of the South Island and on the Three Kings Islands north of Cape Reinga. It is one of a number of New Zealand Metrosideros species which live out their lives as vines, unlike the northern rātā (M. robusta), which generally begins as a hemi-epiphyte and grows into a huge tree. Scarlet rātā is one of the better-known species of rātā vines, because it flowers in autumn or winter, and is often highly visible on well-lit host trees along forest roads, with vibrant displays of large red flowers (sometimes orange or yellow) that rise above the forest canopy.

== Description ==
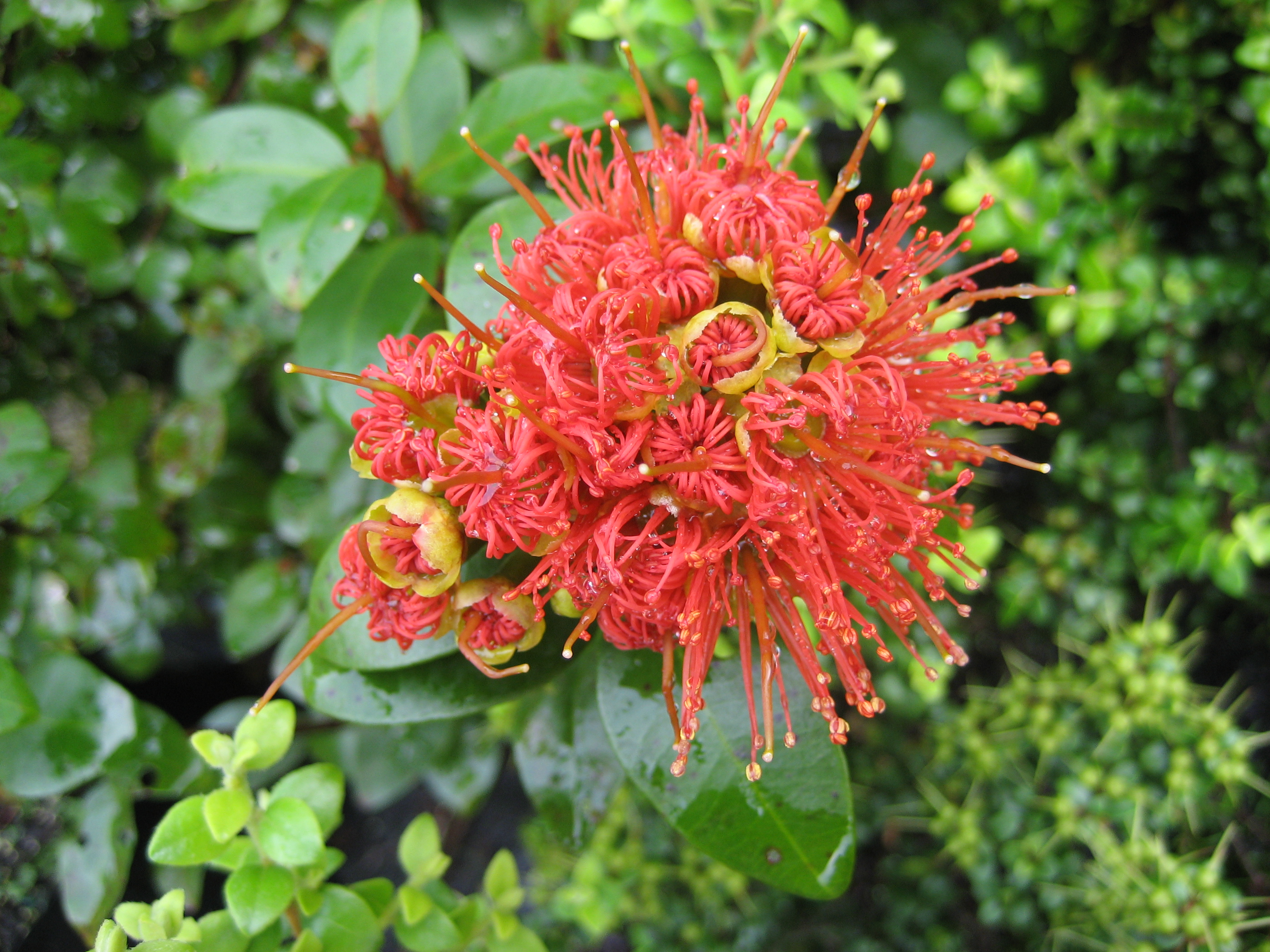
Unfolding stamens of the flower of M. fulgens

Metrosideros fulgens is a species in the genus Metrosideros, it prefers warm moist habitats and grows up to 10 metres (33 feet) long or more, with the main stem up to 10 cm or more in diameter. It climbs in the same way as ivy, sending out short adventitious roots to adhere to the trunks of host trees, penetrating and clinging to rough surfaces. The climbing shoots of juvenile plants are designed to grow rapidly and extend the length of the plant. The short clinging roots usually die after about a year, so that when the vine is mature, the thick, twisted, rope-like stems hang free from the host like thick, sometimes twisted ropes, with red-brown flaky bark. The leaves are mostly rounded at the tip. Flowering is from autumn to spring, with seed capsules taking about a year to ripen.

== Cultivation ==
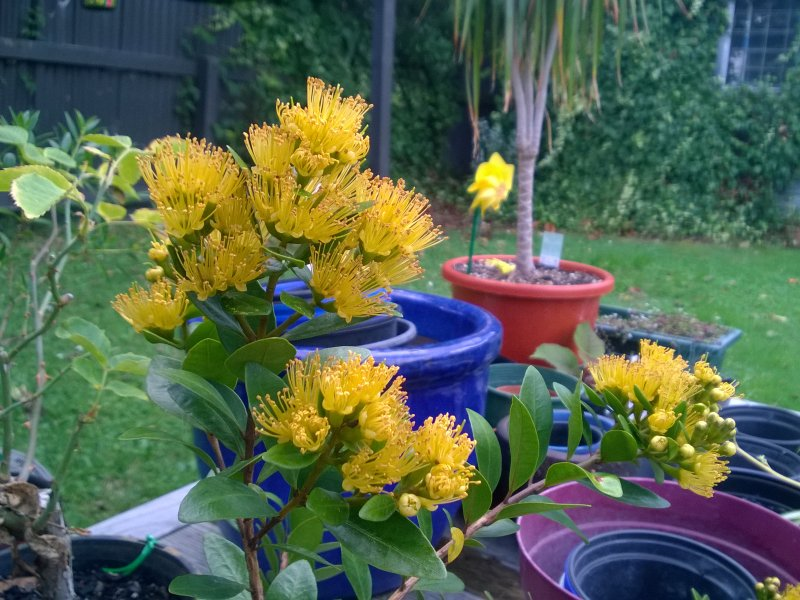
M. fulgens 'Aurata' in bloom

There are several cultivars of M. fulgens available, mostly selected for their flower colours.

- Metrosideros fulgens ‘Gold’/'Aurata' has bright yellow flowers from late summer to early winter and grows to 1.5 by 1.5 metres, taking several years to reach this size. It has attractive fresh light green foliage, and can be trimmed to form an informal hedge. M. Aurata was first encountered in 1890 near Collingwood by a Mrs S. Featon of Gisborne, and was first thought to be a separate species (Metrosideros aurata). M. Gold was the name used when introduced into cultivation, and was sourced in the same area and time as M. Jaffa below.
- Metrosideros fulgens 'Jaffa' is a compact bush producing brilliant burnt-orange flowers. This cultivar was selected in the mid-1990s from a specimen growing on the Tairua-Whitianga Road in the Coromandel Peninsula by Jenny Oliphant. It has been available since 2001.
- Metrosideros fulgens 'Orange Princess' was released in 2000 by Duncan & Davies in Taranaki. This cultivar was sourced from the Onaero River valley. Its appearance is very similar to M. Jaffa.
- Metrosideros fulgens 'Red Glow' is a more "standard" form of M. fulgens and has orangy-red flowers. The source of this cultivar is not known but has only been available for a few years.

In addition to the above cultivars, it is also possible to buy regular forms of M. fulgens through specialist plant nurseries.

== See also ==
- Carmine/crimson rātā
- Colenso's rātā
- Large white rātā
- Small white rātā
- White rātā
