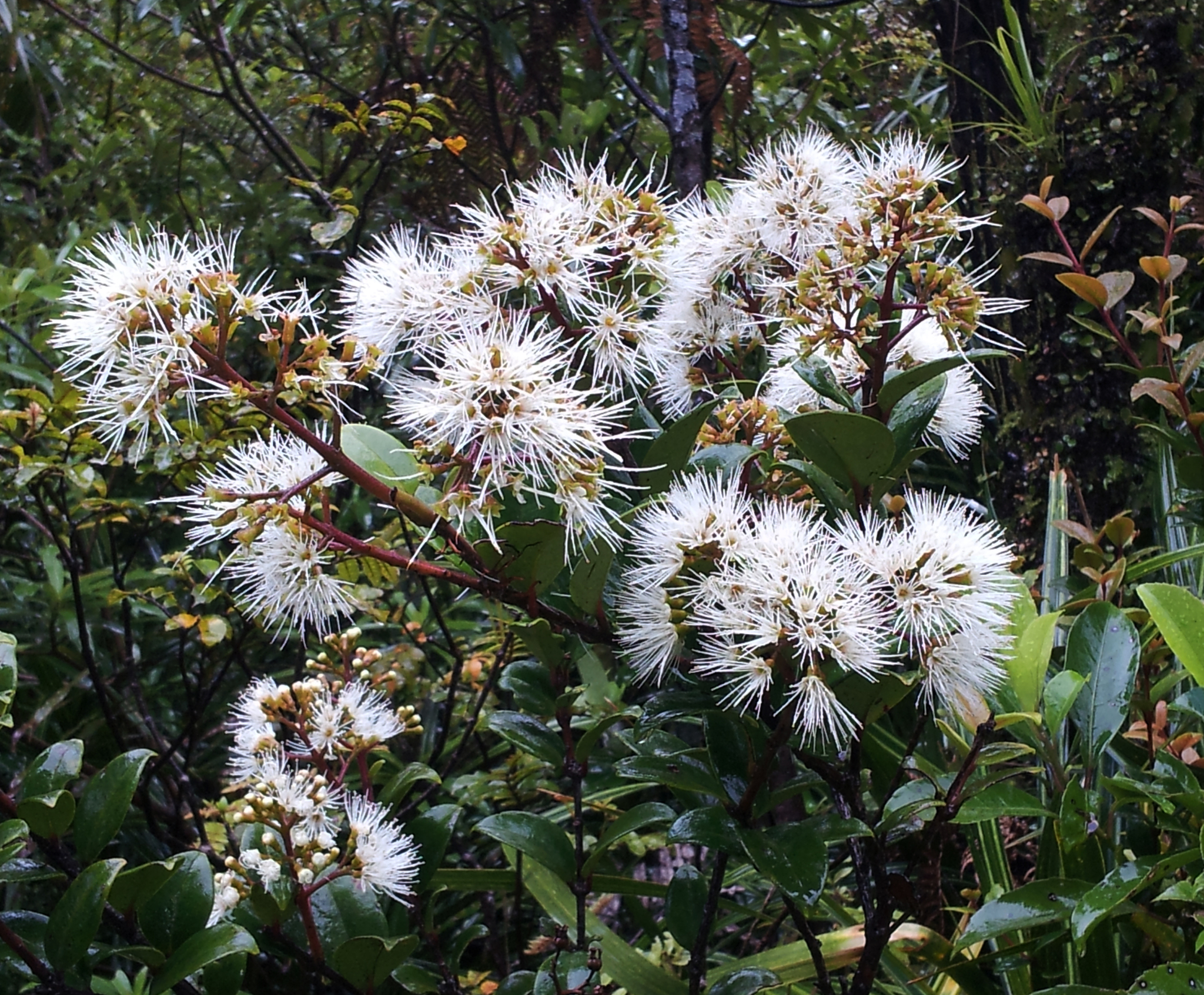

Scientific classification
- Kingdom: Plantae
- Clade: Tracheophytes
- Clade: Angiosperms
- Clade: Eudicots
- Clade: Rosids
- Order: Myrtales
- Family: Myrtaceae
- Genus: Metrosideros
- Species: M. albiflora

Binomial name
- Metrosideros albiflora Sol. ex Gaertn.

Synonyms
- Melaleuca albiflora (Sol. ex Gaertn.) Raeusch.; Metrosideros diffusa A.Cunn. nom. illeg.; Nania albiflora (Sol. ex Gaertn.) Kuntze

= Metrosideros albiflora =

Large white rātā

Species of vine endemic to New Zealand

Metrosideros albiflora, commonly known as large white rātā, Northland white rātā, akatea or simply white rātā, is a forest liane or vine endemic to New Zealand. It is one of three white flowering rātā vines (the others being white rātā and small white rātā). The specific epithet albiflora literally means 'white flowered'. Despite the similar names, large white rātā is distinguished by its much larger leaves and flowers. Its flowers are amongst the largest of any rātā, similar in size to both scarlet rātā and pōhutukawa. It occurs almost exclusively in kauri forests from the northern Kaimai Ranges to Te Paki at the top of the North Island.

== Description ==
The flowers of M. albiflora are a pure white, with flowering between October and March. Leaves grow up to 9 centimetres (3.5 inches) long and are leathery, and the vine can grow up to 10 m (33 ft) high. If no support is available, it will instead form a large bush, and example of this can be seen in Waima, Northland in regenerating bush.

== Conservation ==
As of 2012, M. albiflora is not regarded as threatened.

== Cultivation ==
Metrosideros albiflora has a reputation for being exacting and difficult and is not common in cultivation. It is however available form specialist plant nurseries. In addition to the large white flowers, its new foliage is a reddish colour. It strongly prefers a situation where its base is afforded shade and it is not permitted to dry out excessively.

There is one known cultivar of large white rātā, Metrosideros albiflora 'Northland', which is listed in the Blue Mountain Nurseries catalog.

== See also ==
- Carmine/Crimson Rātā
- Colenso's Rātā
- Scarlet Rātā
- Small White Rātā
- White Rātā
