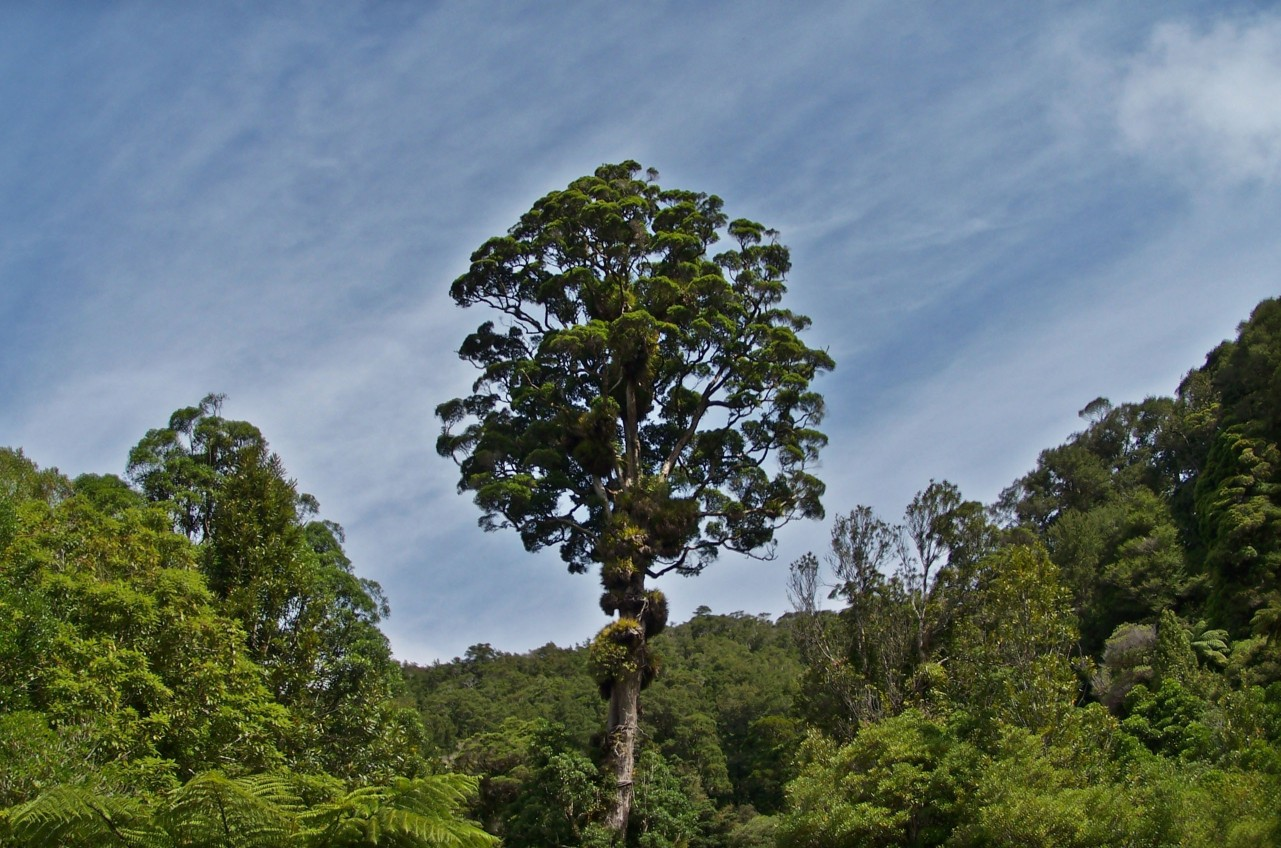
- A northern rātā towers above the forest at Kaitoke Regional Park, Wellington.

Conservation status
- Least Concern (IUCN 3.1)

Scientific classification
- Kingdom: Plantae
- Clade: Tracheophytes
- Clade: Angiosperms
- Clade: Eudicots
- Clade: Rosids
- Order: Myrtales
- Family: Myrtaceae
- Genus: Metrosideros
- Species: M. robusta

Binomial name
- Metrosideros robusta A.Cunn.

Synonyms
- Metrosideros florida Hook.f., nom. illeg. homonym. post.; Nania robusta (A.Cunn.) Kuntze

= Metrosideros robusta =

Northern rātā

Species of tree endemic to New Zealand

Metrosideros robusta, commonly known as the northern rātā, is a forest tree endemic to New Zealand. It grows up to 25 metres (82 ft) or taller, and usually begins its life as a hemiepiphyte high in the branches of a mature forest tree; over centuries the young tree sends descending and girdling roots down and around the trunk of its host, eventually forming a massive, frequently hollow pseudotrunk composed of fused roots. In disturbed ground, or where there are gaps in the forest cover, northern rātā will grow on the ground with a normal but short trunk.

== Distribution ==
Northern rātā is found in the North Island from Te Paki in the north to Wellington in the south. Formerly widespread, it is now uncommon over large parts of its former range, and is apparently absent from all but the south-east of Hawke's Bay. In the South Island, northern rātā is common from Nelson to Greymouth and Hokitika. It reaches its southern limit near Lake Mahinapua at 42°4′ South latitude. The natural habitat is forest along the coasts and in the lowlands. In some parts of its range northern rātā occurs in montane forest. Formerly, with rimu (Dacrydium cupressinum) it was a dominant tree in a forest type known as rimu/rātā forest.

In 2024 an unusual 105 feet (32 meters) tall northern rātā near Karamea on the west coast of South Island, nicknamed the "walking tree" because of its pair of leg-like trunks resembling legs walking across a field, won the New Zealand Arboricultural Association's (NZ Arb)'s Tree of the Year Award with 42% of the public vote.

== Description ==
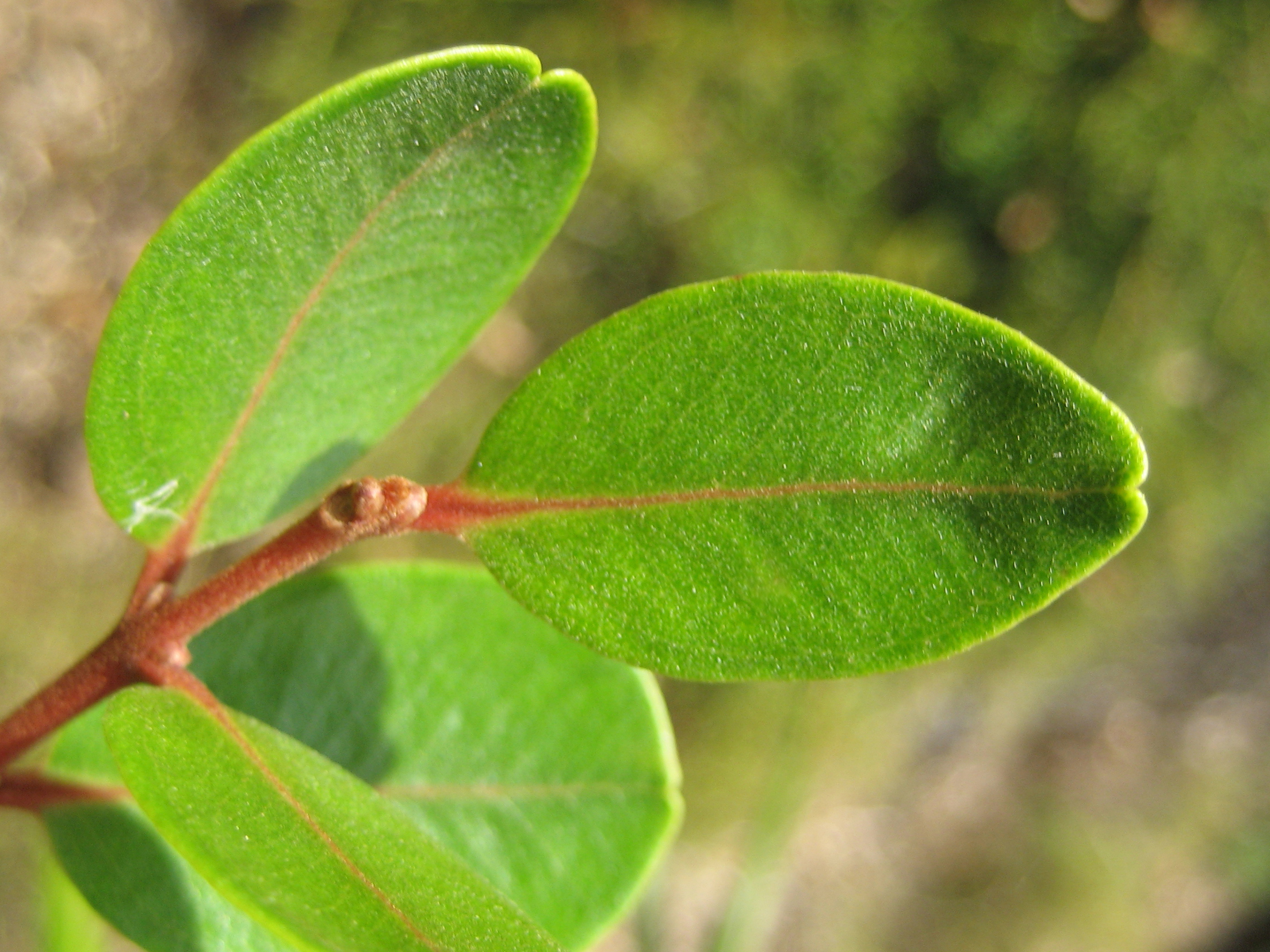
The leaves of northern rātā have a distinct notch at the tip.

Northern rātā is a massive tree, easily distinguished from other Metrosideros species by its small, leathery, dark green leaves that are 2–4 cm (0.79–1.57 in) long, and have a distinct notch at the tip. Young growth is generally pink and covered in fine rust-coloured hairs that are gradually shed as the foliage ages but tend to persist at the midrib and in the vicinity of the leaf base. The flowers, borne in sprays on the tips of branches, are a mass of dark scarlet stamens. Flowering peaks between November and January, and seeds take a year or slightly more to ripen. The bark is usually brown or grey-brown and rather corky and provides an ideal stratum for the roots of epiphytic plants such as Astelia species and Freycinetia banksii (kiekie). The wood is reddish brown, and the manner of its growth results in a twisted grain.

== Hemi-epiphytic growth habit ==
Northern rātā often begins life as hemi-epiphyte, and the resultant tree has a hollow trunk up to 4 m in diameter made up of interlocking roots that enclose the space left by the former host tree.

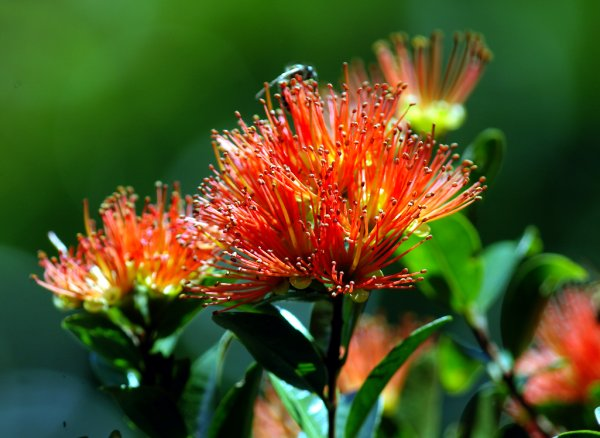
Rātā flowers at Mt Maungatautari

The host tree of epiphytic northern rātā is usually rimu. In former times, the tree was described as a 'strangler', however it may be that rātā can only establish in trees that are already in decline. Northern rātā usually occurs in hardwood, podocarp, and southern beech forests. It is often associated with such species as rewarewa, tawa, hīnau, kānuka, kahikatea, kāmahi, kohekohe, pukatea and māhoe.

== Conservation ==
The greatest threat to northern rata is browsing by introduced possums (Trichosurus vulpecula), which cause severe damage by eating the leaves, buds, flowers and young shoots of the tree. In severe cases this can lead to the death of the tree within two years. In some districts, this has resulted in the local loss of the species. The situation of the species has been improved through the efforts of Project Crimson. Hybridisation with pōhutukawa is another threat to the survival of northern rātā. Pōhutukawa has naturalised in areas south of its natural range, and poses a problem in localities where the northern or southern rātā species are present. Other threats include cutting for firewood, and forest clearance for roading or construction. The IUCN Red List assesses the species as Least Concern.

== Cultivation ==
Northern rātā may be propagated readily from fresh seed. Viability of the seed drops quickly after a few weeks or if it is allowed to dry out. Cuttings do not strike readily, but better results can be obtained from using water shoots.

At least three cultivars of northern rātā have been released. There are also known cultivars of hybrids between northern rātā and pōhutukawa (known as Metrosideros ×sub-tomentosa), and between northern rātā and southern rātā. Known cultivars include:

Cultivar name	Year introduced	Flower colour	Introduced by	Notes
M. robusta 'Kawa Copper'	2001	Dull orange-red	Deane Keir	Coppery red-coloured new growth.
M. robusta 'Krinkley'	1992	Dull orange-red	–	Variegated leaves with a characteristic twist on the leaves. Also marketed as M. robusta 'Tane's Gold' by Duncan & Davies in 1996 and M. robusta 'Twistie'.
M. robusta 'Rangitoto Island'	–	Crimson	Graeme Platt	Sourced from Rangitoto Island.
M. ×sub-tomentosa 'Hauparapara'¤	Late 1980s	Dull orange-red	Graeme Platt	Sourced from Hauparapara River in the Bay of Plenty.
M. ×sub-tomentosa 'Mistral'¤	–	Deep scarlet	Graeme Platt	Sourced from east of Coromandel township on the Coromandel Peninsula.
Metrosideros 'Sentinel Flame'∞	2007	Bright red	Graeme Platt / Vibrant Earth nursery	Sourced from either Great Barrier Island or North-West Nelson.

∞ Hybrid of northern rātā and southern rātā
¤ Hybrid of northern rātā and pōhutukawa

== See also ==
- Metrosideros excelsa, pōhutukawa
- Metrosideros umbellata, southern rātā
- Metrosideros bartlettii, Bartlett's rātā
- Metrosideros parkinsonii, Parkinson's rātā
