= Christmas in Australia =

Christmas celebrations and traditions in Australia

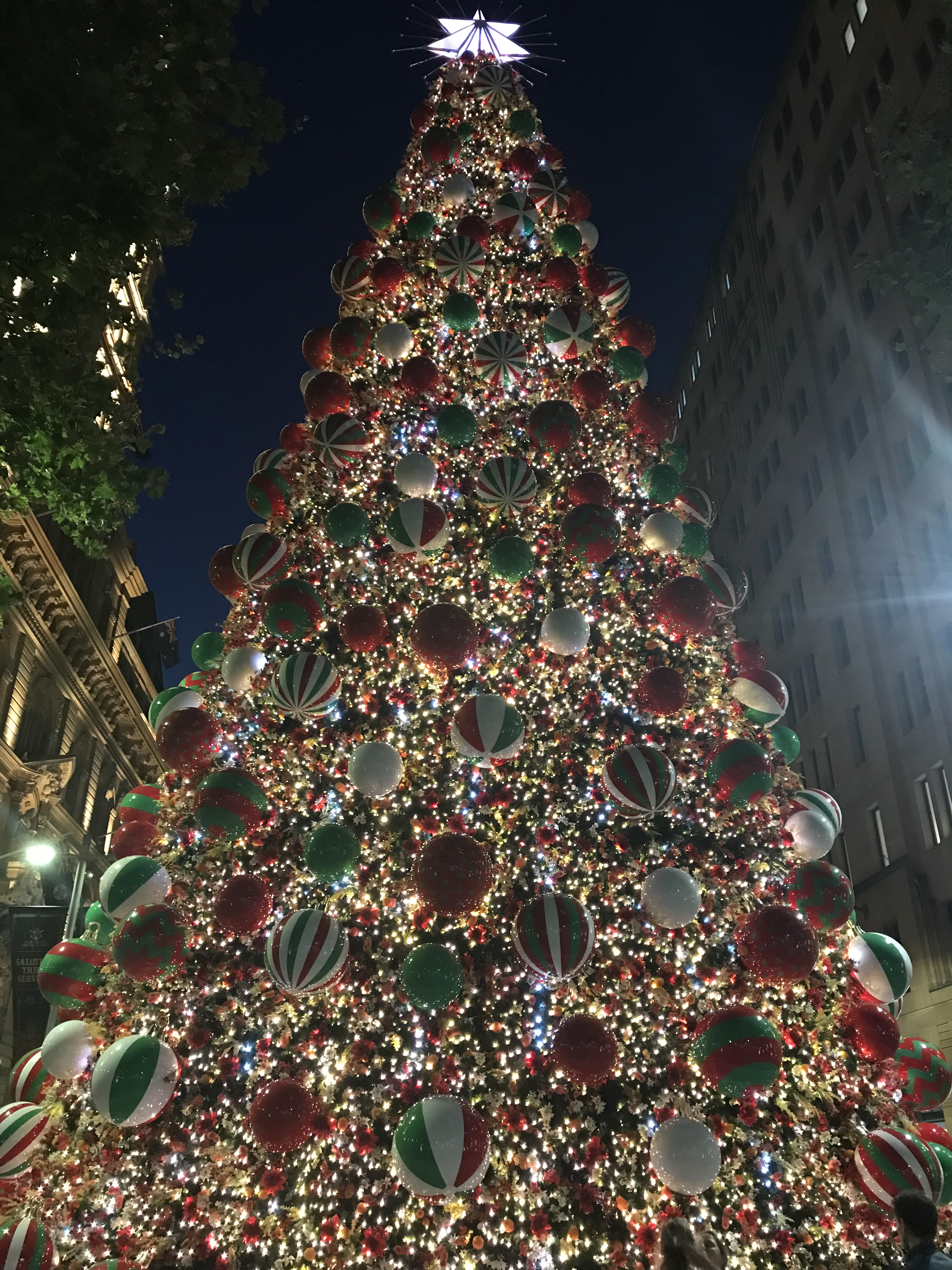
Christmas tree in Sydney's Martin Place, December 2021

Christmas traditions in Australia, like Christmas in New Zealand, have many similarities to British, Irish, American and Canadian traditions, including traditional Christmas symbols featuring winter iconography. This means a red fur-coated Father Christmas or Santa Claus riding a sleigh, songs such as "Jingle Bells", and various Christmas scenes on Christmas cards and decorations. However, the timing of Christmas occurring during the Southern Hemisphere's summer season has resulted in the development of some local traditions as a result of the warmer weather.

== Traditions in common with New Zealand ==
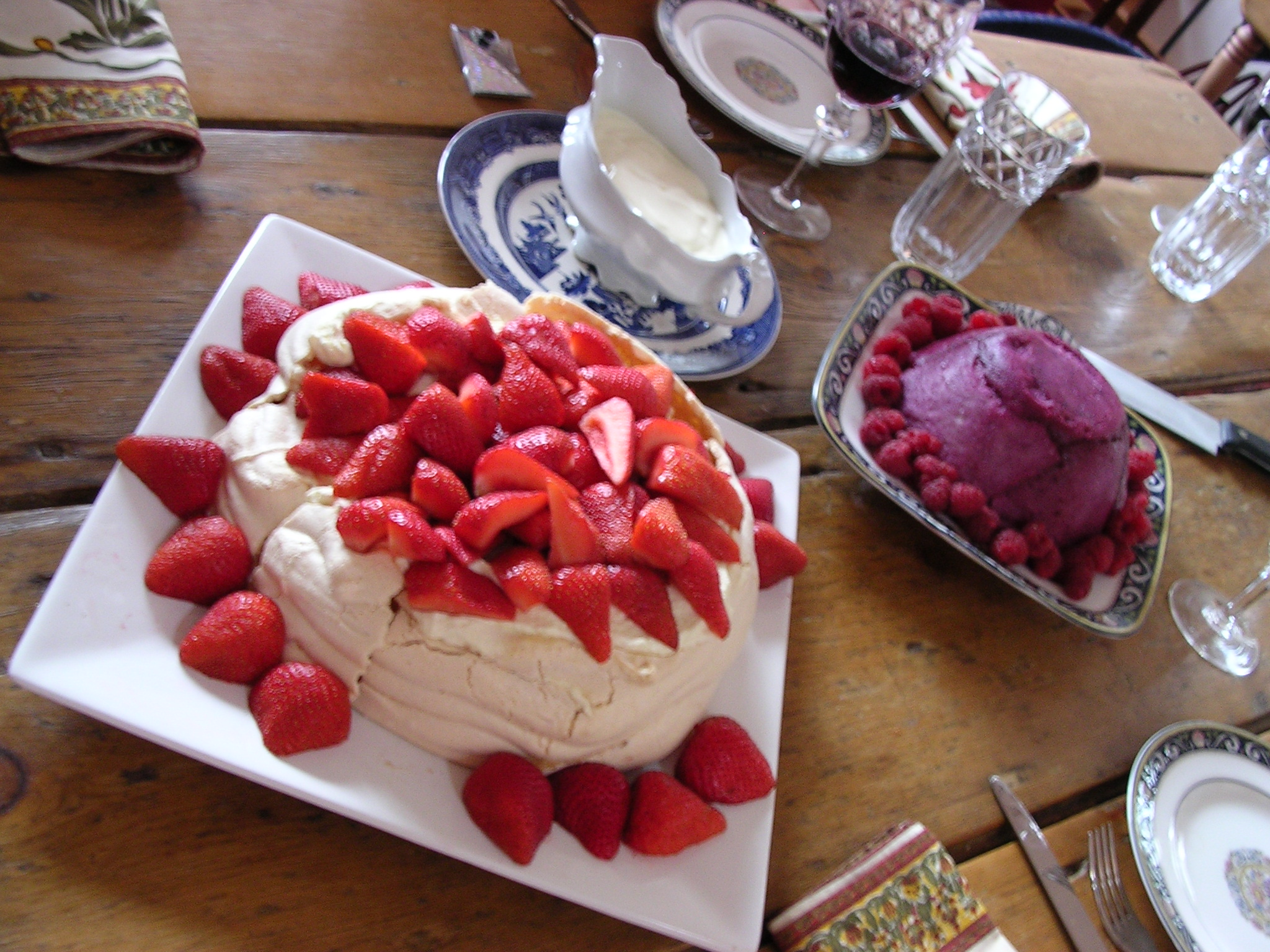
An Australian Christmas dessert pavlova garnished with strawberries

The traditional Christmas tree is central to Christmas decorations, and strings of lights and tinsel are standard. Decorations appear in stores and on streets starting in November and are commonplace by early December. Many homeowners decorate the exterior of their houses. Displays range from modest to elaborate, sometimes with hundreds of lights and decorations depicting seasonal motifs such as Christmas trees, Santa Claus, reindeer, or nativity scenes. Particular regions have a tradition for elaborate displays, and attract a great amount of pedestrian and vehicular traffic during the Christmas season. This is despite the longer days, resulting in sunset occurring after 8 p.m. in areas with daylight saving.

Most workplaces conduct a "Christmas Party" sometime during December, but rarely on Christmas Eve itself. As many people take their holidays between Christmas and New Year's Day, and many workplaces completely close for that period, these parties are effectively an end of the year or break-up party and frequently feature little or no reference to Christmas itself. Likewise, schools, TAFE (vocational training), and universities break for summer holidays. Schools typically end in the week before Christmas, to recommence in late January or early February. Following Christmas, many churches will change their evening meetings to a less formal format, while many hobby clubs also suspend or alter their meetings in this period.

In the lead up to Christmas, many businesses and residential houses will be decorated with Christmas lights and arrangements. It is common to drive around of an evening to look at lights from the car, or for families to walk the residential streets to see front yard displays. Some local councils will hold street light competitions, and maps are regularly posted highlighting the best street light displays.

On Christmas Eve, the children are told, Santa Claus visits houses placing presents for children under the Christmas tree or in stockings or sacks which are usually hung by a fireplace. In recent decades many new apartments and homes have been built without traditional combustion fireplaces, however with some innovation the tradition persists. Snacks and beverages may be left out for Santa to consume during his visit, often milk and cookies, or a beer. Carrots are also commonly left for Santa's reindeer. The gifts are opened the next morning, on Christmas Day.

Families traditionally gather for a Christmas Day lunch. Traditions include prawns, oysters, decorated hams, roast turkey, roast chicken, salads and roast vegetables. Christmas crackers are pulled before eating. More recently, as appropriate to the often hotter weather of the day, it has become popular to serve local seasonal produce such as cold meats, seafood and salad. Similarly, dessert also includes a mix of traditional winter Christmas food (such as plum pudding with brandy butter, fruit mince pies, and trifle) alongside local traditions such as pavlova, and fresh fruit such as berries and kiwifruit. Candy canes are a popular confectionery for the children's table during the Christmas period.

Christmas by Michael Bublé re-enters the album charts every year at Christmas time until the new year, generally reaching number 1 or the top 5. Similarly, "All I Want for Christmas Is You" by Mariah Carey re-enters the singles charts each year until the new year.

As Christmas falls in summer, televised Christmas specials are not a large part of Australian Christmas traditions, unlike in the United Kingdom, in which it is one of the most important days for television ratings. Television ratings in Australia are not taken during the summer and schedules are mostly filled with repeats of old programs or previously cancelled shows. Some locally produced programs have a Christmas special, though often it will be shown early December and not on Christmas Day itself. Many television stations rerun Christmas-themed films in the weeks leading up to and including Christmas Day, such as It's A Wonderful Life, Miracle on 34th Street, National Lampoon's Christmas Vacation, The Polar Express, Dr. Seuss' How the Grinch Stole Christmas and various film versions of A Christmas Carol. Outdoor activities such as street cricket or swimming are popular ways to spend Christmas Day. All Australian television networks carry the Royal Christmas Message on Christmas Day, and the National Basketball League hosts matches on Christmas Day.

== Traditions specific to Australia ==
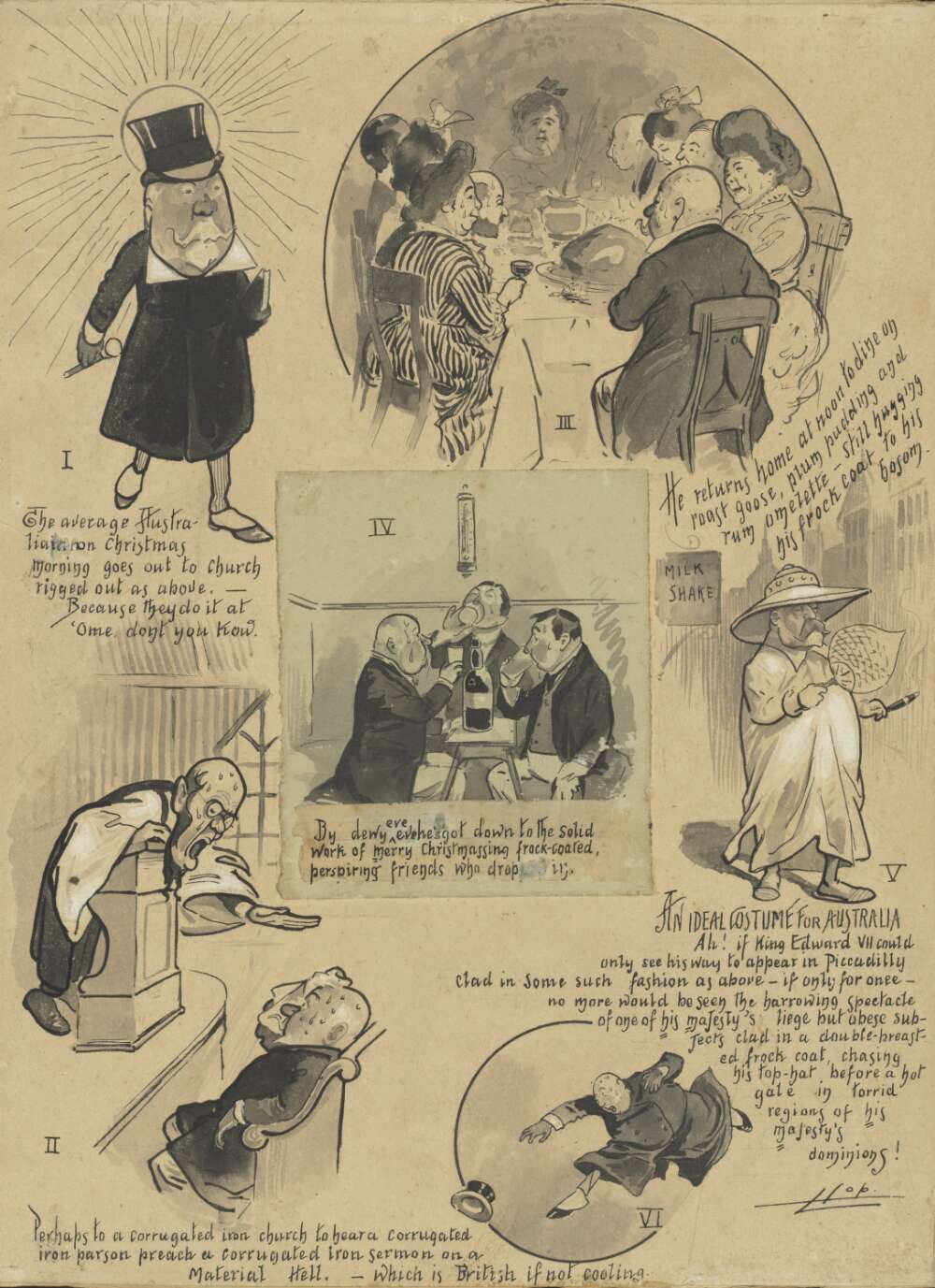
"The average Australian Christmas" cartoon by Livingston Hopkins (c. 1900) – click to enlarge

Some Australian songwriters and authors have occasionally depicted Santa in "Australian"-style clothing including an Akubra hat, with warm-weather clothing and thongs, and riding in a ute pulled by kangaroos (e.g. Six White Boomers by Rolf Harris). There are also a small number of popularly recognised original Australian Christmas songs, including Paul Kelly's How to Make Gravy, Colin Buchanan's Aussie Jingle Bells and Tim Minchin's White Wine in the Sun but these depictions have not replaced mainstream iconography.

The tradition of sending Christmas cards is widely practised in Australia. The price of a Christmas postage stamp is lower than that for a standard letter; senders are required to mark the envelope "card only" when using the lower priced stamps.

Christmas Day and New Years Day are public holidays in Australia, along with Boxing Day. (Technically, South Australia celebrates Proclamation Day rather than Boxing Day, but has the holiday on 26 December to provide uniformity with other states).

=== Local traditions ===
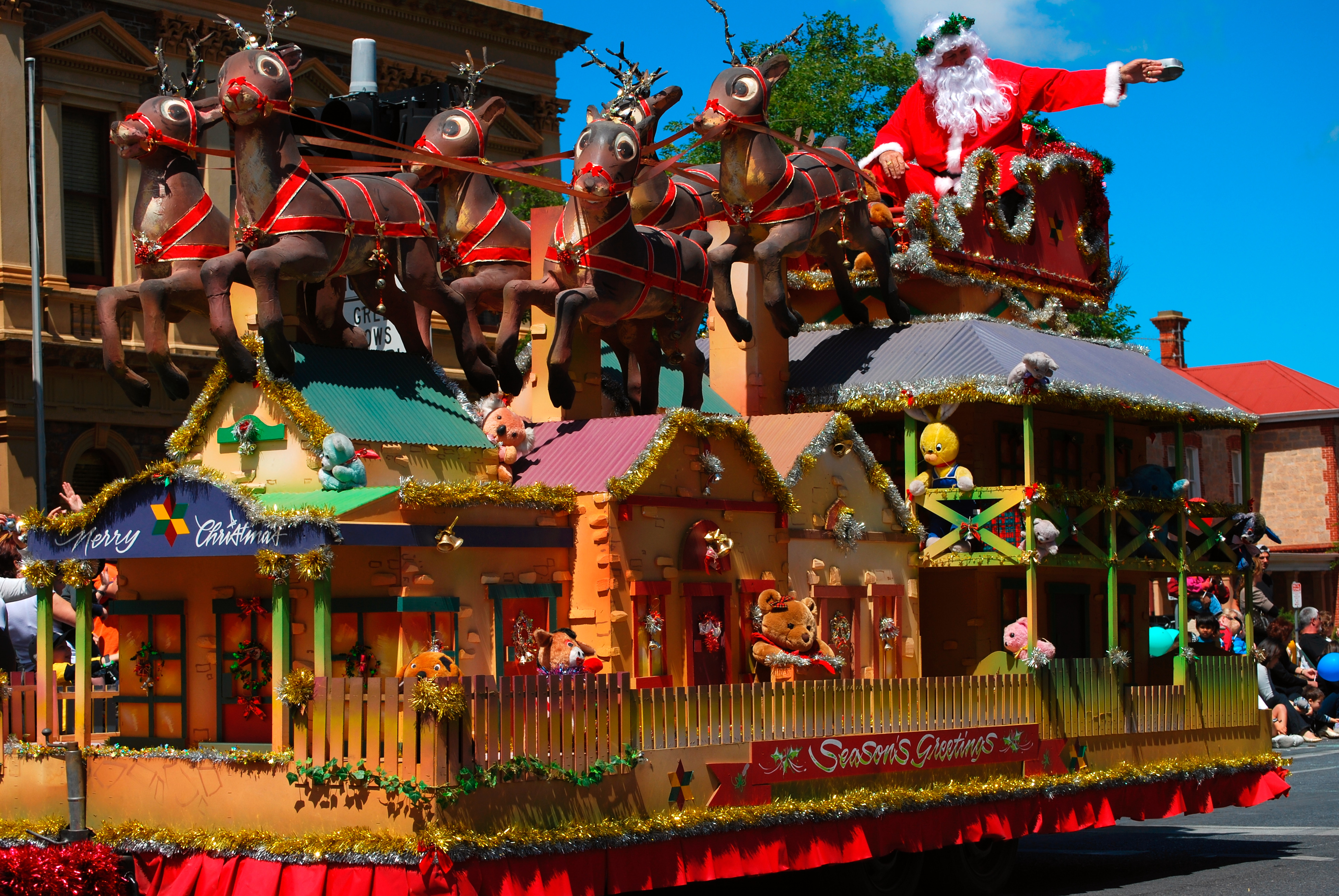
A float in the 2008 Norwood Christmas pageant depicting Father Christmas' sleigh on top of Australian-style historic buildings

==== Australian Capital Territory ====
Canberra hosted a Christmas in July winter festival in 2023. Some local markets also host Christmas-themed markets during December.

==== New South Wales ====
Carols in the Domain took place in Sydney on the Saturday before Christmas Eve until 2015. Since 2016 it has been held on the Sunday before Christmas Eve.

Bondi Beach hosts a large number of international tourists over the holiday season, which is sometimes decorated with Christmas trees, and can feature humorous stunts such as Santas surfing.

==== South Australia ====
A popular tradition celebrated in Adelaide is the Adelaide Christmas Pageant. This parade is the largest of its kind in the world, attracting crowds of over 400,000 people. Begun in 1933 by the department store John Martins, the pageant is staged in early November every year, usually on a Saturday morning, marking the start of the Christmas season. It comprises a procession of floats, bands, clowns, dancing groups, and walking performers, all culminating in the arrival of Father Christmas. At the terminus of the pageant Father Christmas proceeded to the Magic Cave in the store (the event is no longer sponsored by a department store, and from 2019 the pageant finishes at the Adelaide Town Hall). Smaller scale pageants are also held in regional centres.

South Australia does not have a Boxing Day holiday. Rather, the weekday following Christmas Day being the Proclamation Day holiday. Christmas Eve, from 7:00 pm to midnight is now a public holiday.

==== Tasmania ====
Hobart traditionally begins its festive season with the Hobart Christmas Pageant in November, which features floats and music and attracts over 30,000 people.

Launceston celebrates the lighting of the Christmas tree at Brisbane Street mall in late November.

==== Victoria ====
Carols by Candlelight is a tradition that started in Melbourne in 1938 and has since spread around Australia and the world. At the event people gather on Christmas Eve, usually outdoors, to sing carols by candlelight in a large-scale concert style event. The Vision Australia's Carols by Candlelight which takes place at the Sidney Myer Music Bowl in Melbourne on Christmas Eve, is televised nationwide and it has become a tradition for many Australians to watch the performance.

==== Western Australia ====
The Perth Christmas Pageant has been run in the central business district since 1972. It is organised by Seven West Media.

Between 1999 and 2016, the City of Perth ran an annual Christmas tree lighting ceremony. Since 2017, it has been replaced with the Christmas Lights Trail, in which various Christmas-themed light displays are put around the City of Perth. The event runs from late November to either late December or early January.

== Christmas music from Australia ==
| Title | Composer / lyricist | Year published | Notes |
|---|---|---|---|
| First Hymn for Christmas Day | James Johnson | 1840s | Composed for Saint James Church, Van Diemen's Land |
| Christmas Present Polka | John Howson | 1852 | Cover Art show pioneer lady with pudding |
| All my heart this night rejoices | Charles Edward Horsley | 1862 | |
| Hymn for Christmas-Day | James Johnson | 1862 | |
| Our Australian Christmas Song | Ernesto Spagnoletti | 1863 | |
| Christmas In Australia | George Tolhurst | 1864 | Lyrics celebrate southern hemisphere summer Christmas |
| Christmas Quadrille | Richard Herz | 1864 | biography unknown - music printed in Melbourne |
| Victorian Christmas Waltz | Cesare Cutolo | 1866 | no lyrics |
| Christmas Anthem | Paolo Giorza | 1870 | |
| Song Of The Angels | Charles Sandys Packer | 1883 | |
| Oh, lovely voices of the sky | Alfred Pumpton | 1890 | |
| Star of The East | Augustus Juncker | 1890 | |
| While all things were in quiet silence | Henry John King | 1899 | Protestant school master - setting of Solomon 18:14 King James Bible |
| In The Cathedral | George Savin De Chanéet | 1900 | |
| Yuletide Gavotte | John Albert Delany | 1900 | |
| Nine Christmas Carols | Arthur Rivers | 1904 | Sheet music sold eighteen thousand copies |
| My Little Christmas Belle | Joe Slater and Ward McAllister | 1910 | |
| Australian Christmas Carol | Joseph Summers | 1908 | Captures the sound of St Georges Perth Cathedral Bells |
| Star Of The East | August Juncker | 1910 | |
| Eleven Carols | Arthur Massey | 1910 | unclear if these tunes are original or arrangements of existing songs |
| The Christmas story in carols | Arthur Rivers | 1912 | |
| Bush Christmas Carol | Jessie Penfold | 1912 | Western Australian |
| A Christmas Hymn | Joseph Furphy (Tom Collins) & Arthur Chanter | 1914 | |
| The Night Of Fear Is Over | Fritz Hart | 1929 | |
| Carol of the Birds (Orana Orana) | William G. James / John Wheeler | 1948 | |
| The North Wind (Christmas Day) | William G. James / John Wheeler | 1948 | AHB #246 / Together in Song #322 |
| The Three Drovers | William G James / John Wheeler | 1948 | |
| Hurrah For Father Christmas | Christian Hellerman | 1952 | |
| An Australian Christmas Carol (O Little Babe of Bethlehem) | Mother Francis Frewin I.B.V.M. | 1952 | Most common melody appears in the 1952 Hymnal of St Pius X. |
| Six White Boomers | Rolf Harris & John D. Brown | 1960 | |
| Santa Never Made It into Darwin | Bill & Boyd | 1975 | |
| Aussie Jingle Bells | Colin Buchanan | 1992 | |
| How to Make Gravy | Paul Kelly | 1996 | |
| Go Santa Go | The Wiggles | 1996 | |
| Santa Wear Your Shorts | Hi-5 | 2001 | |
| White Wine in the Sun | Tim Minchin | 2009 | |
