= Santa statue (New Zealand) =

Former sculpture in Auckland, New Zealand

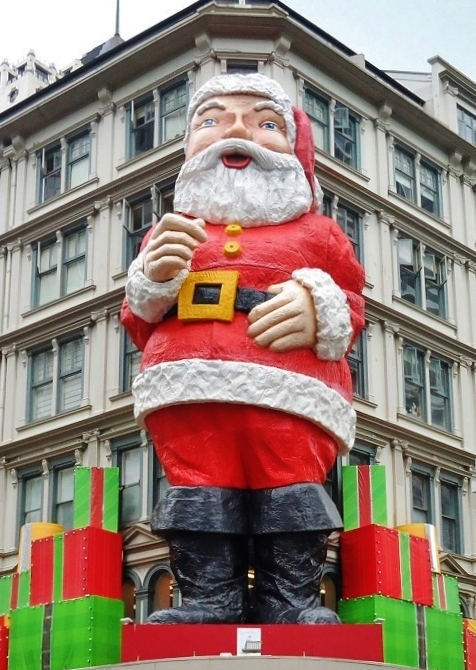
The 18-metre (59 ft) tall Santa on the Whitcoulls Building on Queen Street in 2011

An 18-metre (59 ft) tall sculpture of Santa Claus was used in the New Zealand city of Auckland during Christmas seasons from 1960 to 2020. From 1960 to 1991 it was used on a Farmers department store building on the corner of Wyndham and Hobson Streets, from 1991 to 1995 at Manukau City Shopping Centre and from the 1990s to 2020 on the Whitcoulls building in Queen Street. Due to the high costs of maintaining, storing and installing the sculpture, it stopped being used in Auckland in 2020 and was bought by and moved to the National Transport & Toy Museum in Wānaka.

The Santa is famous for its "creepy" appearance. A restoration in 2009 reduced the creepiness of the sculpture and replaced its moving winking eye and beckoning finger with ones that are stationary. In 2011, the American website cracked.com ranked the Santa statue as the "World's creepiest Christmas ornament".

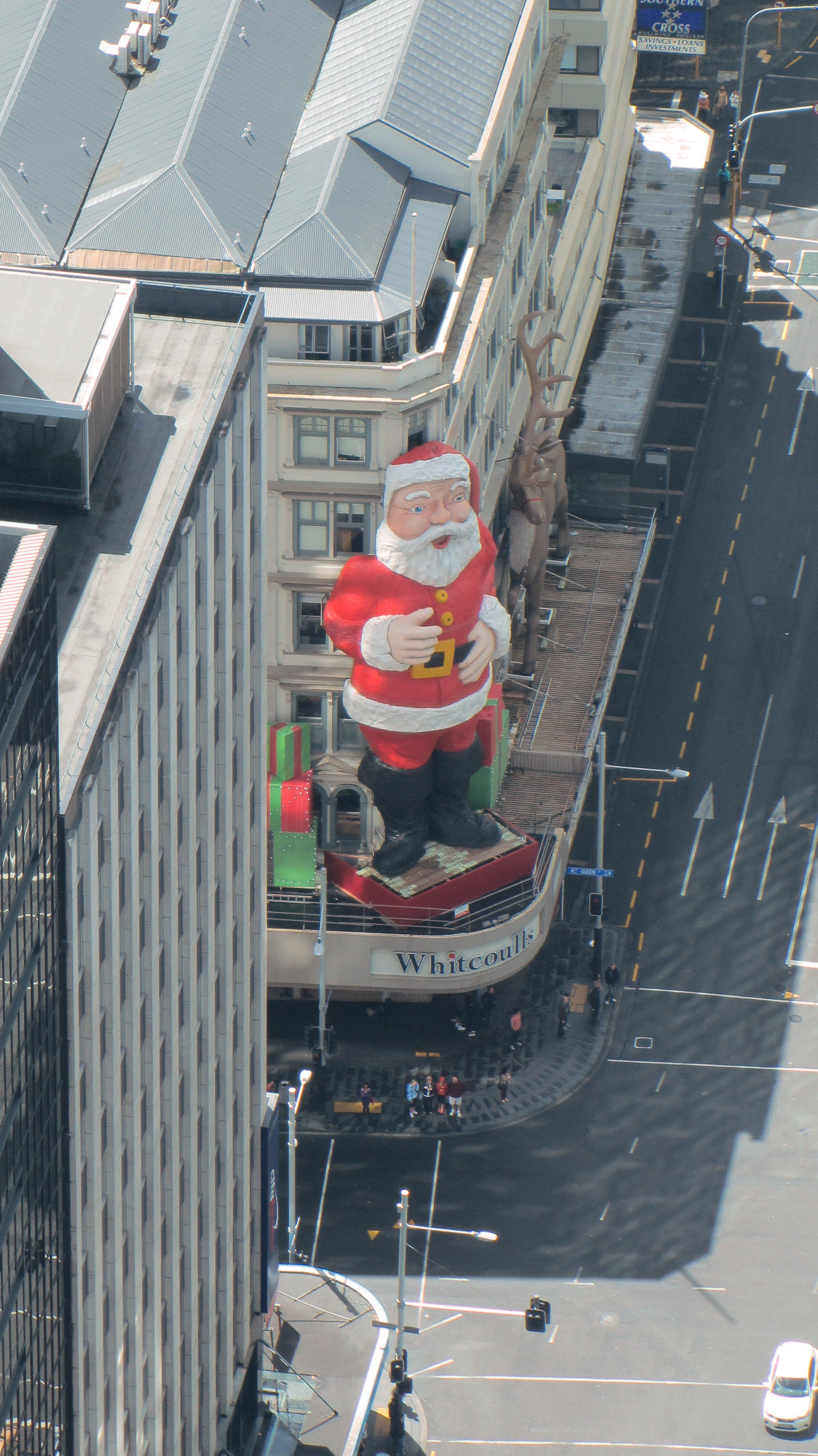
The statue in 2012, viewed from the Sky Tower

== Description ==
The sculpture is made of fibreglass and steel tubing, is 18 metres (59 ft) tall and weighs 5 tonnes (11,000 lb). Until 2009 it had a winking eye and a beckoning finger, which both moved. The finger was made to encourage members of the public to enter the building on which it was located. When it was in Auckland, there were reindeer and presents that accompanied the Santa. Roads had to be closed when it was set up in the city.

== History ==
The giant sculpture was made by New Zealand department store chain Farmers in 1960. It was displayed each Christmas at the Farmers location in Auckland on the corner of Wyndham and Hobson Streets.

When the building was sold in 1990, the Manukau City Shopping Centre, which had a Farmers store, partially funded displaying the statue at their location. After only five years, the shopping centre stopped using the giant Santa citing its "tatty appearance", and the Farmers company discussed whether to keep the statue, which was by that point rotting and rusting inside.

Ultimately, Stephen Hanford, a marketing and events consultant, bought the statue for $1. After two years of negotiations, the purchase was completed in 1998, and Hanford sought both money and services to restore the sculpture in the Penrose suburb, Southdown Industrial Park. The restoration was completed with aid from over 40 people and at a cost of $40,000. In addition to repainting it, the interior of the statue had to be renovated: rotten structures beneath the fibreglass and rusting metal support structures had to be replaced.

After the restoration, the Santa was placed on the Whitcoulls building in Queen Street, with financial support from Whitcoulls, Auckland City Council and a few companies and individuals. When Hanford moved to Australia in 2003, Whitcoulls became the owners of the Santa. However, the company announced in December 2008 that it could not afford the $55,000 costs and gave it to Heart of the City, causing ratepayers to cover the cost of maintaining the Santa. In 2009 the statue was refurbished at a cost of more than $100,000, reducing the perceived creepiness of the sculpture and replacing the moving finger and winking eye with ones that were stationary. In 2014 the sculpture was almost not set up due to the $180,000 cost of assembly and storage, but the sculpture was installed after public backlash, including Prime Minister John Key joking that it would be a national outrage.

In 2020, the Santa statue stopped being used due to the high cost to maintain and use it, above $200,000 per annum, and because it needed to be restored. A campaign, endorsed by Prime Minister Jacinda Ardern, sought to have the Santa moved to Te Papa, New Zealand's national museum. However, Jason Rhodes of the National Transport & Toy Museum in Wānaka spent $1 million to buy the sculpture for his museum. It was moved there in late 2020. As of 2021, the disassembled sculpture is lying in the bottom of a quarry in Wānaka. As of 2023, the Santa's face is attached to the side of one of the museum's buildings but the rest is in storage. Rhodes estimated in 2023 that it would take about two or three years for the entire Santa sculpture to be assembled, as it required restoration.

== Reception ==
In 2011 the American website cracked.com ranked the Santa statue as the world's most "unintentionally creepy Christmas ornament".

== See also ==
- Christmas in New Zealand
