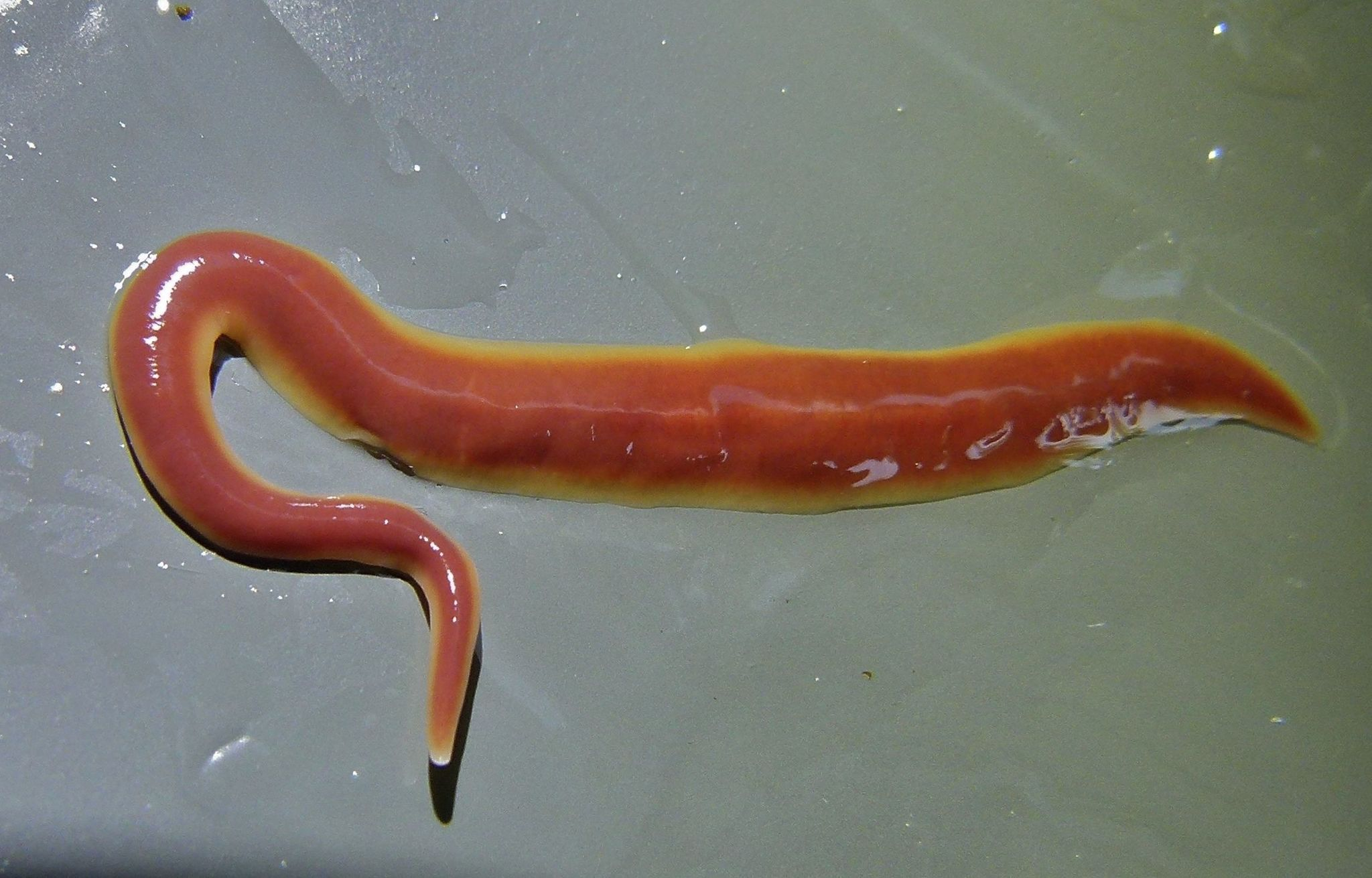
- Arthurdendyus testaceus

Scientific classification
- Kingdom: Animalia
- Phylum: Platyhelminthes
- Order: Tricladida
- Family: Geoplanidae
- Tribe: Caenoplanini
- Genus: Arthurdendyus; Jones & Gerard, 1999

Type species
- Geoplana triangulata Dendy, 1896

= Arthurdendyus =

Genus of flatworms

Arthurdendyus is a genus of land planarians from New Zealand. It was erected in 1999 and includes the invasive species Arthurdendyus triangulatus, known as the New Zealand flatworm.

== Description ==
Species of Arthurdendyus are characterized by a bell-shaped pharynx and ovaries placed laterally to the male copulatory apparatus, while most land planarians species have ovaries located much more anteriorly, usually close to the brain or to the pharynx. Other characteristic shared with closely related genera, such as Artioposthia and Newzealandia, is the presence of adenodactyls in the copulatory apparatus.

== Etymology ==
The name Arthurdendyus honors the English zoologist Arthur Dendy who described many land planarians from Australia and New Zealand.

== Species ==
The genus Arthurdendyus includes the following species:

- Arthurdendyus albidus Jones & Gerard, 1999
- Arthurdendyus australis (Dendy, 1894)
- Arthurdendyus latissimus (Dendy, 1896)
- Arthurdendyus testaceus (Hutton, 1880)
- Arthurdendyus triangulatus (Dendy, 1896)
- Arthurdendyus vegrandis Winsor & Stevens, 2005
