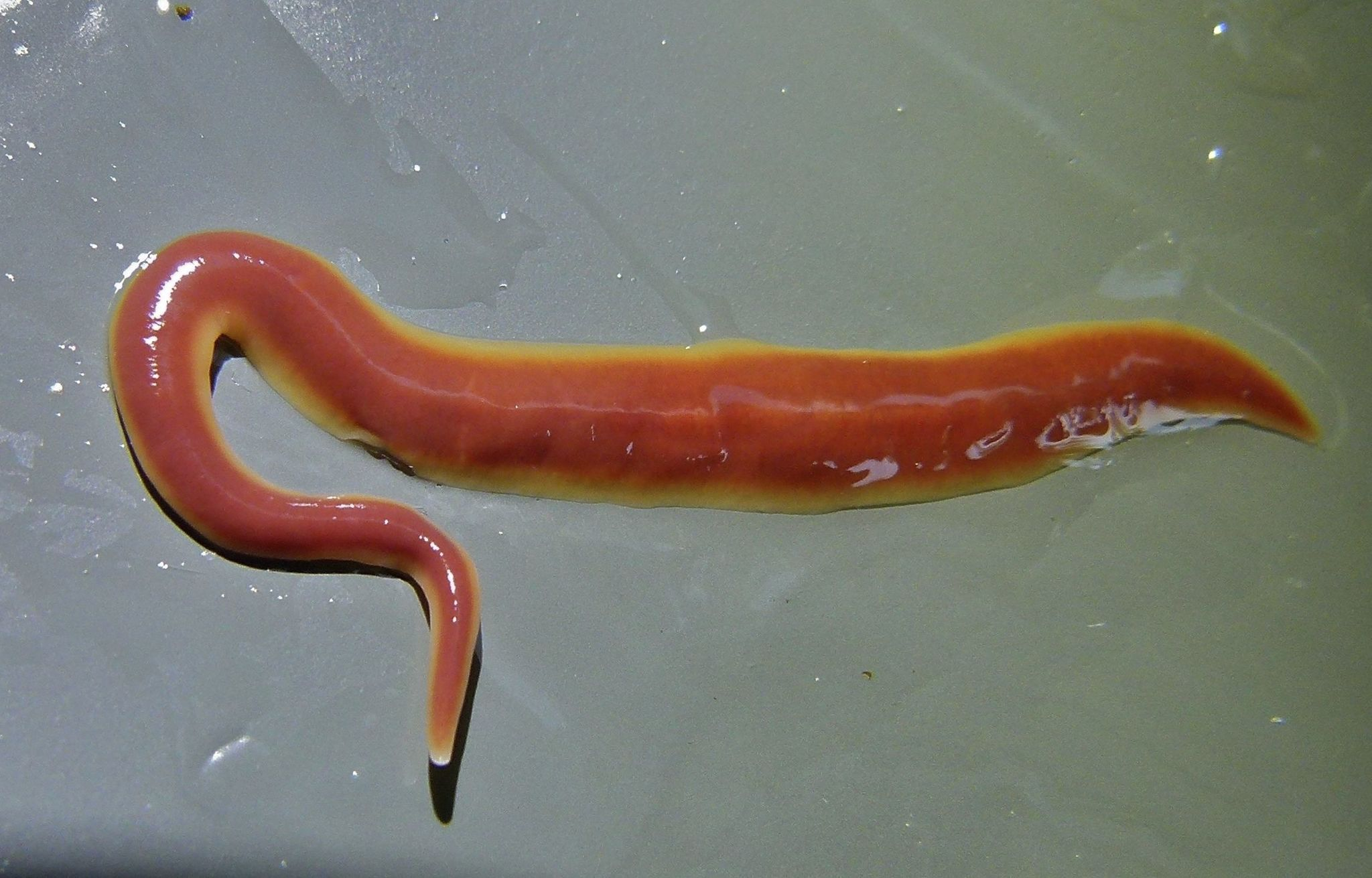

Scientific classification
- Kingdom: Animalia
- Phylum: Platyhelminthes
- Order: Tricladida
- Family: Geoplanidae
- Genus: Arthurdendyus
- Species: A. testaceus

Binomial name
- Arthurdendyus testaceus (Hutton, 1880)

Synonyms
- Artioposthia testacea (Hutton, 1880); Australopacifica testacea (Hutton, 1880); Geoplana testacea Hutton, 1880; Rhynchodemus testaceus Hutton, 1880

= Arthurdendyus testaceus =

Species of flatworm

Arthurdendyus testaceus is a species of land planarian belonging to the tribe Caenoplanini. It is native to Australia and New Zealand.

== Description ==
The body of Arthurdendyus testaceus is long and tapers to a point at each end; it is around 7–8 cm in length. It lacks eyespots. The dorsal side is a red color, ranging from a dull brick-red to a bright cherry-red. The ventral side is yellow.
