= Arthurdendyus albidus =

Scientific classification
- Kingdom: Animalia
- Phylum: Platyhelminthes
- Order: Tricladida
- Family: Geoplanidae
- Genus: Arthurdendyus
- Species: A. albidus

Binomial name
- Arthurdendyus albidus Jones, 1999

Synonyms
- Artioposthia australis (Dendy, 1894); Geoplana triangulata australis Dendy, 1894

Species of flatworm

Arthurdendyus albidus is a species of land planarian belonging to the tribe Caenoplanini. It is found in Scotland, though it is thought to have originated in New Zealand before being introduced like other members of its genus.

== Etymology ==
The specific epithet of albidus derives from the Latin word for "whitish", in reference to the species' main color.

== Description ==
Arthurdendyus albidus is a creamy white color. Its body is elongate and mostly flat, though the backside is slightly raised. It has been observed to be able to reach up to 130 mm in length and 5 mm in width. When contracted, the body length can decrease by up to half. It has several very small eyes that are generally unable to be seen even under magnification.
