= Invasive species of New Zealand origin =

Some species endemic to New Zealand are causing problems in other countries, similar to the way introduced species in New Zealand cause problems for agriculture and indigenous biodiversity.

== Animals ==
- The New Zealand mud snail (Potamopyrgus antipodarum) is an invasive species in many countries and has been present in Europe since 1859.
- The New Zealand flatworm (Arthurdendyus triangulatus) is an invasive species in Europe where it preys on earthworms and degrades soil quality.
- Weka (Gallirallus australis) were introduced to several islands south of New Zealand, including Macquarie Island in the 1870s, where the weka was utilized as a food source. However, despite their survivability against other predators to islands it is not native to, the weka became a pest by outcompeting prey against native birds, and is claimed to have contributed to the extinction of the Macquarie parakeet and a native species of land rail. The weka population in Macquarie Island declined in the 1980s and was fully eradicated in 1988.

== Plants ==
- Taupata (Coprosma repens), also known as mirror bush, looking-glass bush, New Zealand laurel or shiny leaf, is a weed in Australia, Norfolk Island, South Africa and the U.S. (California and Hawaii).
- Pōhutukawa (Metrosideros excelsa), sometimes called the New Zealand Christmas tree, is an invasive species in South Africa.
- The biddy biddy (Acaena novae-zelandiae) is declared a noxious weed in the American states of Hawaii, California and Oregon. It is also a problem plant in Northumberland.
- New Zealand flax or harakeke (Phormium tenax) is an invasive species in St Helena, some Pacific islands and in Australia.
- Pohuehue (Muehlenbeckia complexa), also called wire vine, mattress vine and several other common names, is naturalised in Western Australia. Although it is a valued garden plant, it can become a pest in suitable climates (e.g. San Francisco's Golden Gate National Recreation Area) if not contained.
- Mānuka (Leptospermum scoparium) and kānuka (Kunzea ericoides) were planted in Hawaii during the early 20th century and have infested several islands.
- Ngaio (Myoporum laetum) forms dense thickets in coastal areas of Southern California and Mexico and is therefore a serious weed.

== See also ==
- Invasive species in New Zealand
- Invasive species of Australian origin
