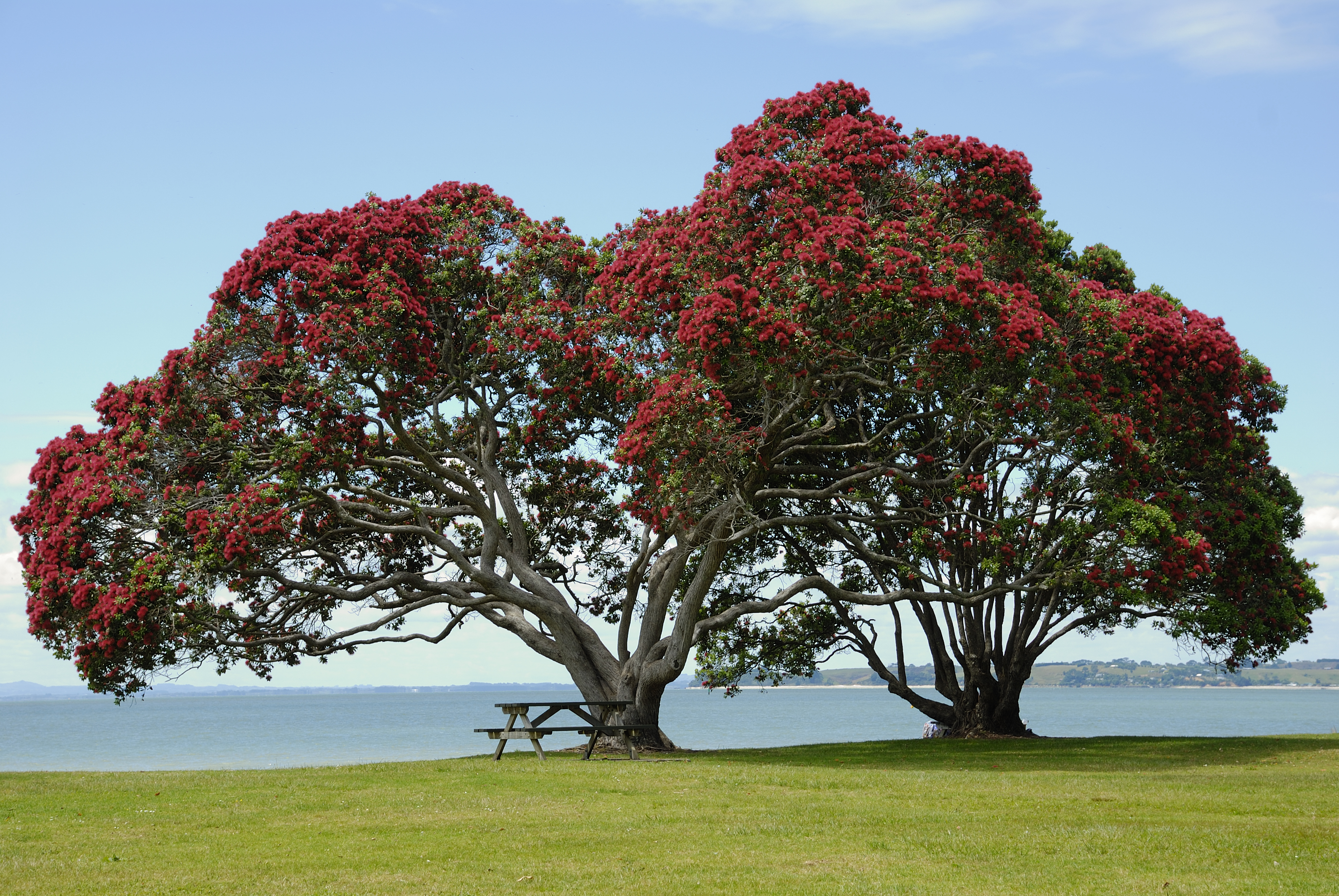
- Pōhutukawa trees at Cornwallis Beach

Conservation status
- Not Threatened (NZ TCS)

Scientific classification
- Kingdom: Plantae
- Clade: Tracheophytes
- Clade: Angiosperms
- Clade: Eudicots
- Clade: Rosids
- Order: Myrtales
- Family: Myrtaceae
- Genus: Metrosideros
- Species: M. excelsa

Binomial name
- Metrosideros excelsa Sol. ex Gaertn.

Synonyms
- Metrosideros tomentosa A.Rich.; Nania tomentosa (A.Rich.) Kuntze

= Pōhutukawa =

Species of tree endemic to New Zealand

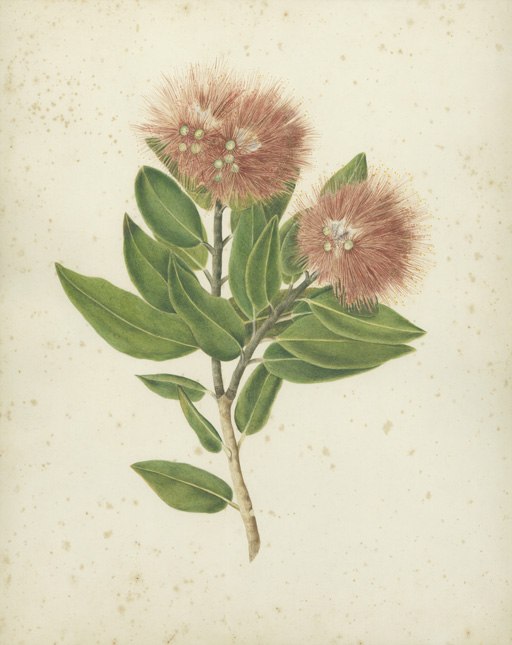
Botanical illustration of a pōhutukawa sprig by Ellen Cheeseman

Pōhutukawa (Metrosideros excelsa), also known as the New Zealand Christmas tree, or iron tree, is a coastal evergreen tree in the myrtle family, Myrtaceae, that produces a brilliant display of red (or occasionally orange, yellow or white) flowers, each consisting of a mass of stamens. The pōhutukawa is one of twelve Metrosideros species endemic to New Zealand. Renowned for its vibrant colour and its ability to survive even perched on rocky, precarious cliffs, it has found an important place in New Zealand culture for its strength and beauty, and is regarded as a chiefly tree (rākau rangatira) by Māori.

== Etymology ==
Pōhutukawa in Māori is closest to Rarotongan poʻutukava referring to a coastal shrub with white berries, Sophora tomentosa. The -hutu- part of the word comes from *futu, the Polynesian name for the fish-poison tree (Barringtonia asiatica; compare with Fijian: vutu and Tongan: futu), which has very stameniferous flowers similar to those of the pōhutukawa.

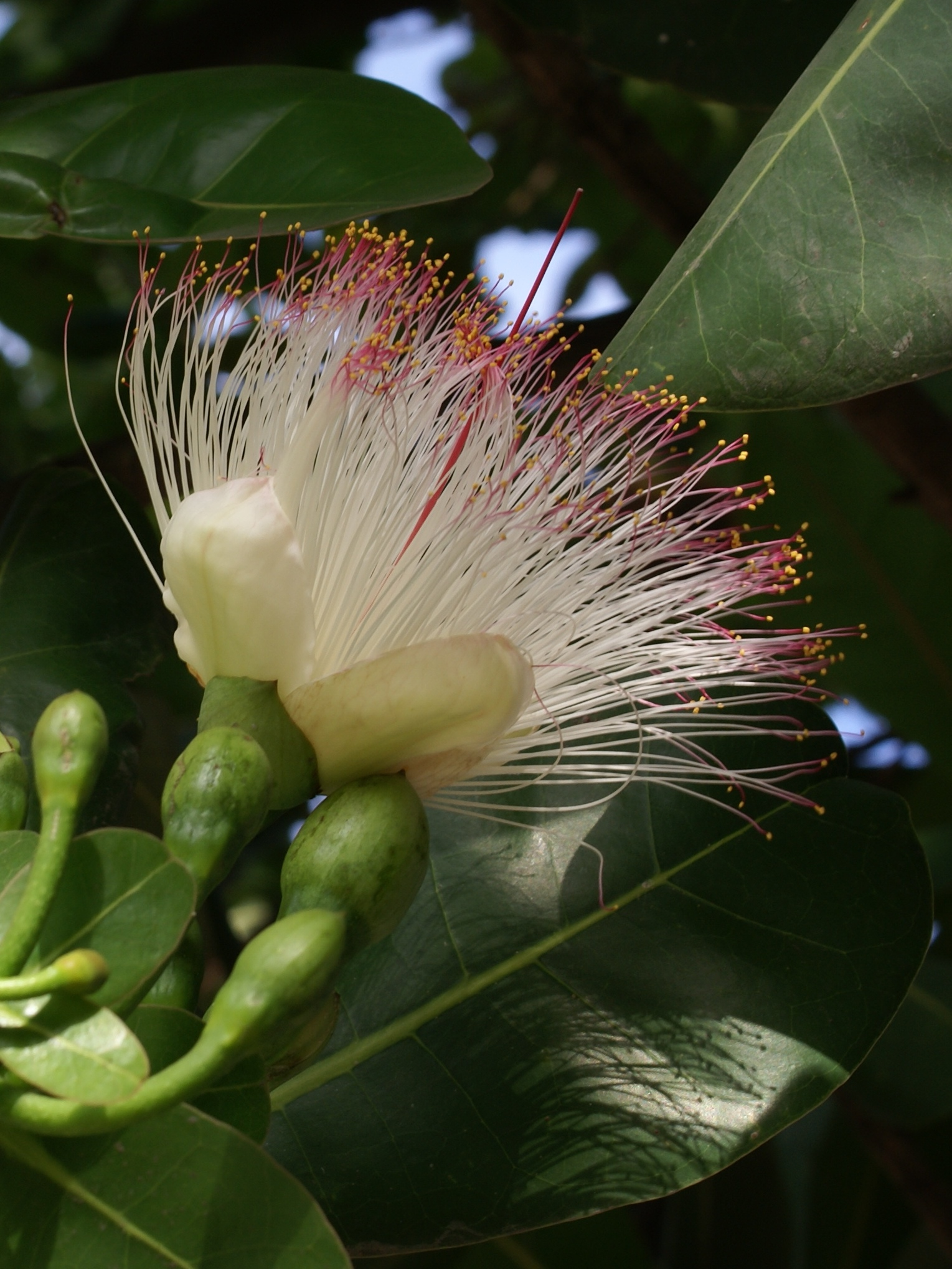
Flower of fish poison tree known as futu or ʻutu extant throughout Polynesia

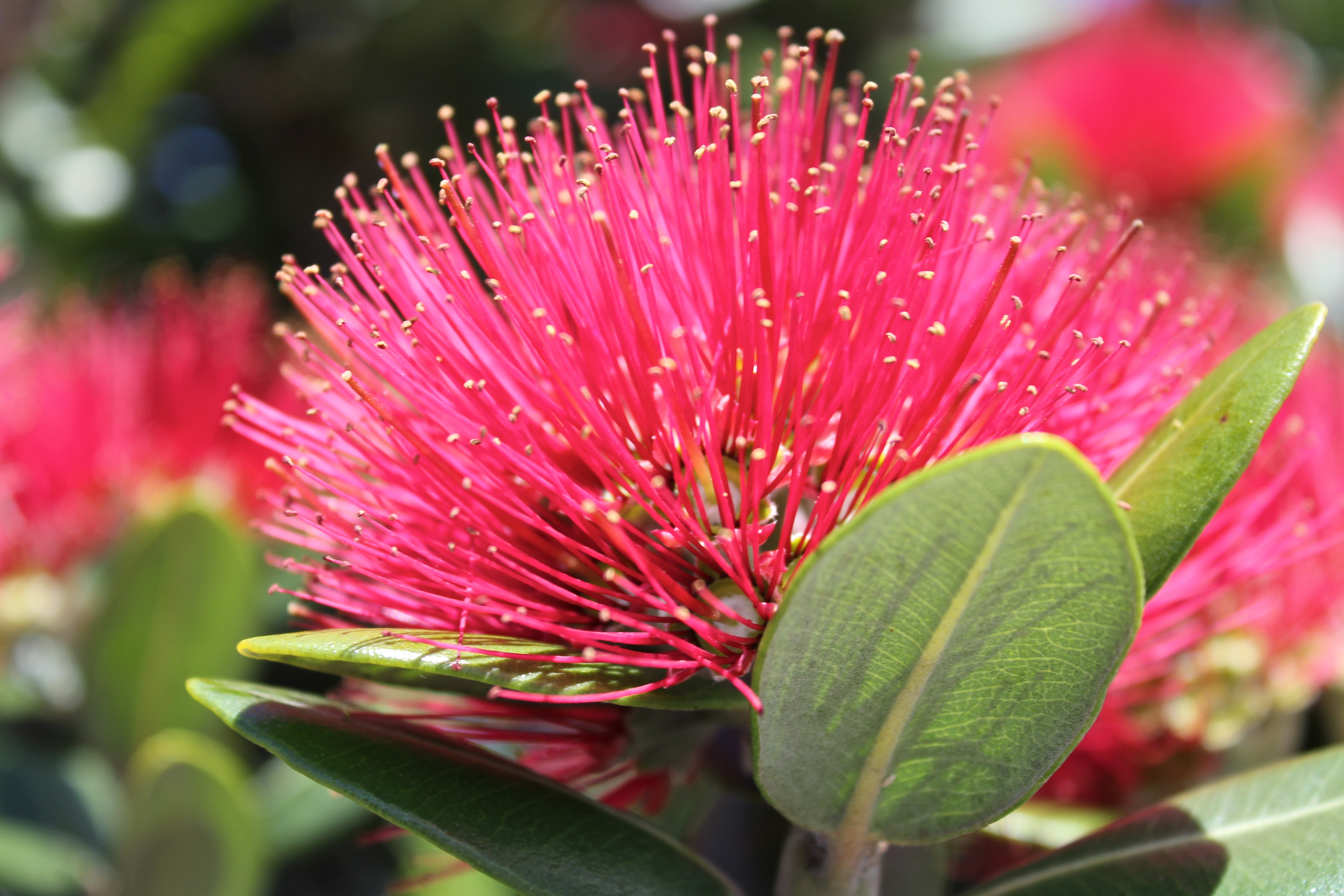
Pōhutukawa flower

The generic name Metrosideros derives from the Ancient Greek mētra or 'heartwood' and sideron or 'iron'. The epithet excelsa is from Latin excelsus, 'highest, sublime'.

== Description ==
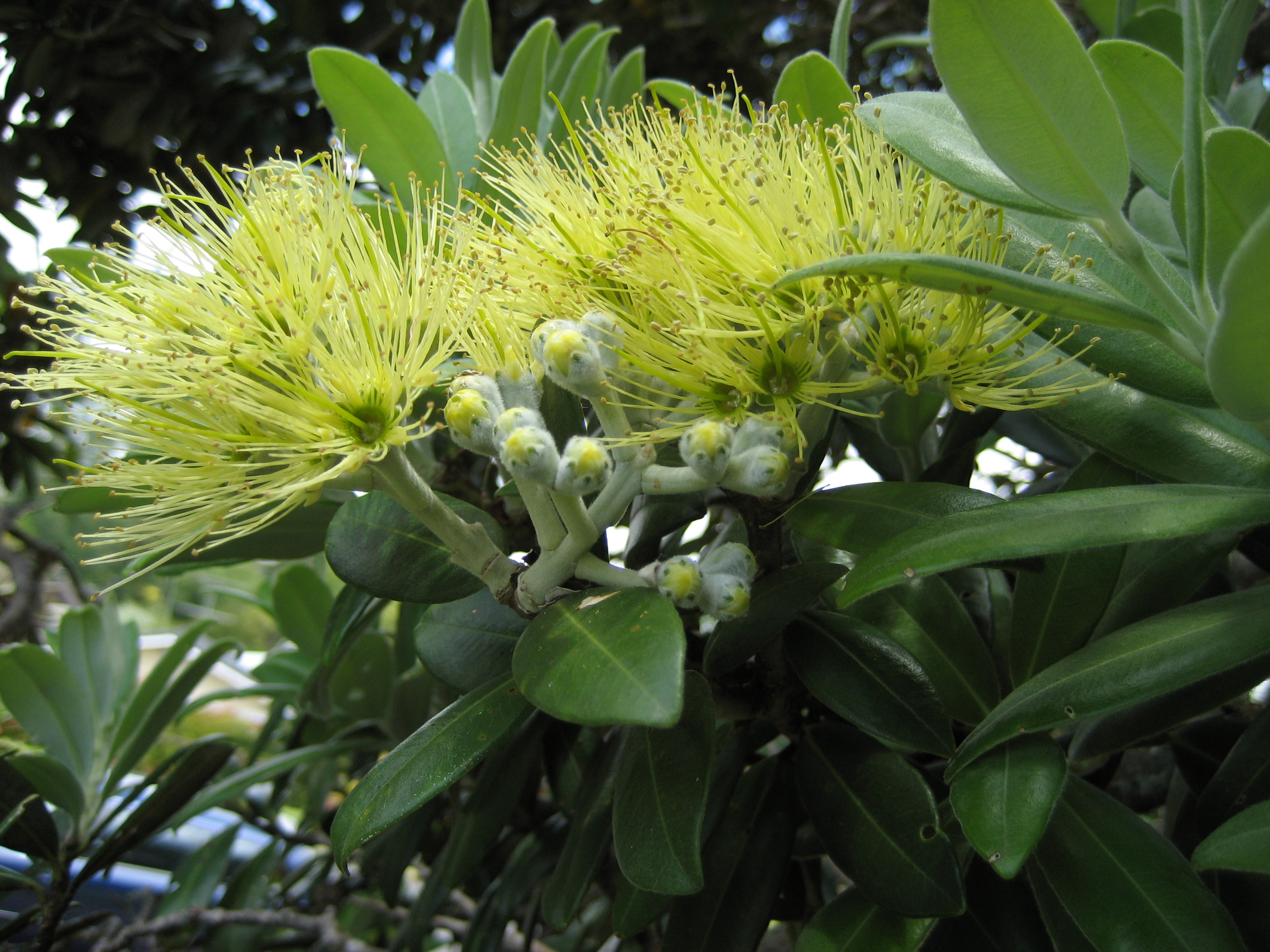
The yellow-flowering "Aurea" cultivar

Pōhutukawa grow up to 25 metres (82 ft) high, with a spreading, dome-like form. They usually grow as a multi-trunked spreading tree. Their trunks and branches are sometimes festooned with matted, fibrous aerial roots. The oblong, leathery leaves are covered in dense white hairs underneath.

The tree flowers from November to January with a peak in early summer (mid to late December), with brilliant crimson flowers covering the tree, hence the nickname New Zealand Christmas tree. The first published reference to pōhutakawa as a Christmas tree was in 1857, in a newspaper report of a feast held by Eruera Patuone. There is variation between individual trees in the timing of flowering, and in the shade and brightness of the flowers. In isolated populations genetic drift has resulted in local variation: many of the trees growing around the Rotorua lakes produce pink-shaded flowers, and the yellow-flowered cultivar 'Aurea' descends from a pair discovered in 1940 on Mōtītī Island in the Bay of Plenty.

== Distribution ==
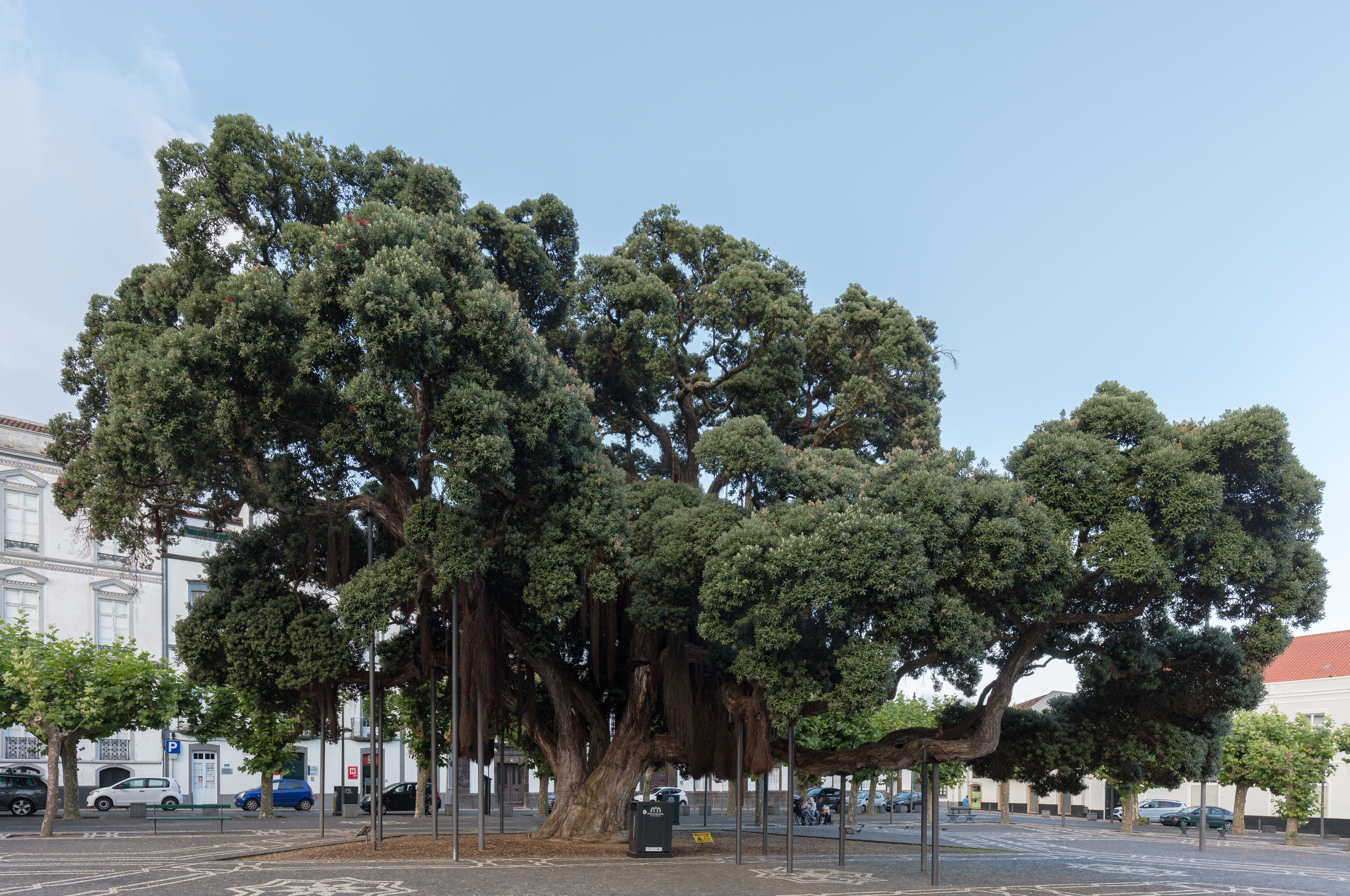
Metrosideros excelsa on Ponta Delgada, Azores, Portugal

The pōhutukawa's natural range is the coastal regions of the North Island of New Zealand, north of a line stretching from New Plymouth (39° S) to Gisborne (38° S), where it once formed a continuous coastal fringe. By the 1990s, pastoral farming and introduced pests had reduced pōhutukawa forests by over 90%. It also occurs naturally on the shores of lakes in the Rotorua area and in Abel Tasman National Park at the top of South Island.

The tree is renowned as a cliff-dweller, able to maintain a hold in precarious, near-vertical situations. Like its Hawaiian relative the ʻōhiʻa lehua (M. polymorpha), the pōhutukawa has been shown to be efficient in the colonisation of lava plains – notably on Rangitoto, a volcanic island in the Hauraki Gulf.

== Conservation ==
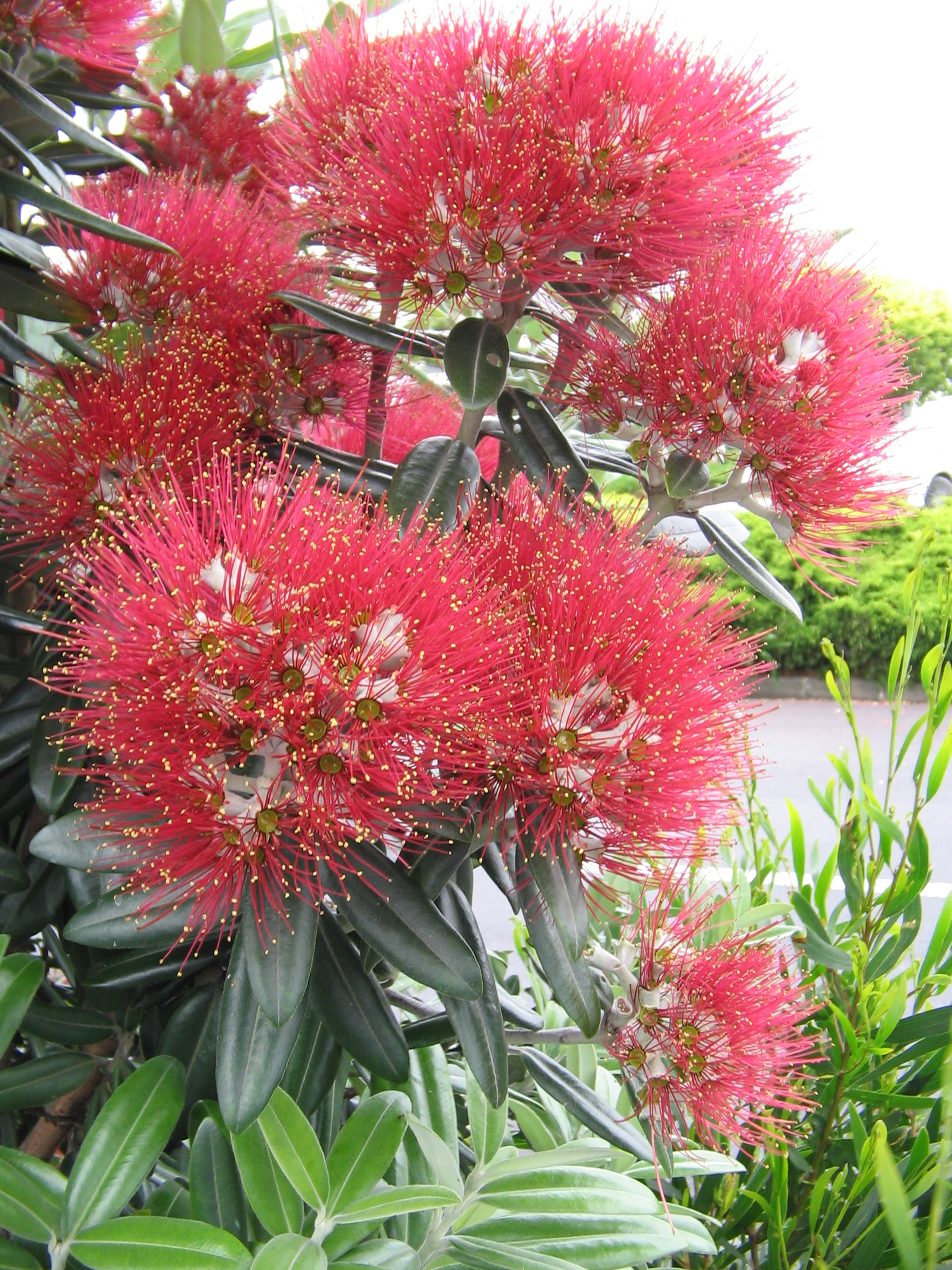
A pōhutukawa in bloom

In New Zealand, pōhutukawa are under threat from browsing by the introduced common brushtail possum which strips the tree of its leaves. A charitable conservation trust, Project Crimson, has the aim of reversing the decline of the pōhutukawa and other Metrosideros species – its mission statement is "to enable pōhutukawa and rata to flourish again in their natural habitat as icons in the hearts and minds of all New Zealanders".

== Uses ==
Pōhutukawa wood is dense, strong and highly figured. Māori used it for beaters and other small, heavy items. It was frequently used in shipbuilding, since the naturally curvy shapes made strong knees. Inner bark extracts are used in rongoā (traditional healing) for the treatment of diarrhoea and dysentery, and the nectar used to treat sore throats.

The tree is used to create pōhutukawa honey, which is produced in areas such as Rangitoto Island.

=== Cultural significance ===
According to Te Rangi Hiroa, many oral histories of migrations to New Zealand that followed Kupe recorded on the brilliance of pōhutukawa flowers blooming on Bay of Plenty that captivated sailors as they landed there on the blooming period between November and December; one story told of an ariki that discarded his red feather decorations normal to their original Polynesian islands in response to the sight saying: “the chiefly colour of Hawaiki is cast aside for the chiefly red of the new land that welcomes us”.

== Cultivation ==
Pōhutukawa are popular in cultivation, and there are fine examples in most North Island coastal cities. Vigorous and easy to grow, the tree flourishes well south of its natural range, and has naturalised in the Wellington area and in the north of the South Island. It has also naturalised on Norfolk Island to the north. Pōhutukawa have been introduced to other countries with mild-to-warm climates, including south-eastern Australia, where it is naturalising on coastal cliffs near Sydney. In coastal California, it is a popular street and lawn tree, but has caused concern in San Francisco where its root systems are blamed for destroying sewer lines and sidewalks. In parts of South Africa, pōhutukawa grow so well that they are regarded as an invasive species. The Spanish city of A Coruña has adopted the pōhutukawa as a floral emblem.

At least 39 cultivars of pōhutukawa have been released. Duncan & Davies nurseries were a leading force in the mid-20th century, while the late Graeme Platt has been responsible for 16 different cultivars so far, including a rare white-flowering tree. Cultivars include:

Cultivar name	Year introduced	Flower colour	Introduced by	Notes
M. excelsa 'Aurea'	1947	Greenish-yellow	Duncan & Davies	Sourced from Mōtītī Island.
M. excelsa 'Blockhouse Bay'	mid-1980s	Bright red	Graeme Platt	Sourced from Blockhouse Bay, Auckland.
M. excelsa 'Butterscotch'	1993	Fire Red	Duncan & Davies	Reddish stems and reddish-gold new leaves becoming butter-yellow and finally green with age. Sourced from M. excelsa 'Sunglow'.
M. excelsa 'Centennial'	-	-	Graeme Platt	Reverse-variegated cultivar, erect growth habit. Sourced from Auckland Domain centennial plantings.
M. excelsa 'Christmas Cheer'	-	Crimson	Bob Bayly	Consistently flowering around Christmas time. Flowers in large clusters.
M. excelsa 'Dalese'	2010	Orange-red	Lyndale Nurseries	Compact, low-growing selection. Often incorrectly sold as M. tomentosa 'Dalese', especially in Australia.
M. excelsa 'Fire Mountain'	mid-1970s	Orange-scarlet	Felix Jury / Duncan & Davies	Very bright flowers and spreading habit. Sourced from Waitara riverbank plantings.
M. excelsa 'Firestone'	1983	Fire-red	Graeme Platt	Bright flowers and sprawling form. Sourced from Mt Moehau, Coromandel Peninsula.
M. excelsa 'Flame Crest'	1991	Orange-scarlet	Cyril Watson & George Smith / Duncan & Davies	Tall, erect form. Sourced from Kawaroa Park, New Plymouth.
M. excelsa 'Gold Finger'	1986	Deep crimson	Duncan & Davies	Reverse-variegated form with bright gold leaves.
M. excelsa 'Golden Dawn'	2003	Melon Pink	Robert Harrison	Reverse-variegated cultivar from Australia. Grows to around 5 metres (16 ft). Grew from M. excelsa 'Pink Lady' under cultivation. 10–20% chance of variegation reverting.
M. excelsa 'Gold Nugget'	2000	-	Jim Rumbal / Duncan & Davies	Variegated cultivar with fresh green margins and yellow centres.
M. excelsa 'Hauraki'	-	Red	Graeme Platt	Outstanding sized flowers and tall, erect form. Sourced from Long Bay Regional Park, Auckland.
M. excelsa 'Kopere'	2007	Orange-red	Graeme Platt	Vibrant flowers and glossy green leaves. Sourced from Brooks Bay, near Awhitu Regional Park, Auckland.
M. excelsa 'Lighthouse'	1983	Crimson	Graeme Platt	Early flowering (November). Sourced from Rangitoto Island.
M. excelsa 'Manukau'	1990	Orange-red	Graeme Platt	Well-balanced flower heads that also bloom inside the canopy of the tree. Sourced from Manukau City shopping centre.
M. excelsa 'Maori Princess'	1970s	Red	Ian McDowell / Duncan & Davies	Open branched, upright tree. Sourced from Brougham Street, New Plymouth.
M. excelsa 'Midas'	1988	Red	William (Bill) Robertson	Reverse-variegated cultivar from Australia, but slightly unstable (can revert to non-variegated status)
M. excelsa 'Mini Christmas'	-	Red		Low growing cultivar from Australia, grows to around 1m tall.
M. excelsa 'Moon Maiden'	1988	Sulphur yellow	Duncan & Davies	Light grey-green foliage. Sourced from M. excelsa 'Aurea'.
M. excelsa 'Mt Maunganui'	1993	Red	Lyndale Nurseries	Sourced from Pitau Road, Mount Maunganui. Source tree of significance to Ngāi Te Rangi iwi, where several Māori skeletons were found at its base.
M. excelsa 'Octopussy'	2004	Red	Naturally Native NZ Plants Auckland	Weeping growth habit. Sometimes available as a standard.
M. excelsa 'Ohope'	-	Red	Duncan & Davies	Variegated form. Green leaves with cream margins.
M. excelsa 'Parnell'	early 1970s	Red	Graeme Platt	Very large and widely spreading tree. Sourced from Parnell Rose Gardens, Auckland.
M. excelsa 'Pink Lady'	1988	Melon Pink	Duncan & Davies	Small upright tree with compact flower heads.
M. excelsa 'Plus Four'	2002	Bright Red	Graeme Platt	Upright growth habit. Sourced from Awhitu Golf Course, Auckland.
M. excelsa 'Pouawa'	-	-	Graeme Platt / Rob Bayly	Long-lasting flowers. Sourced from north of Gisborne.
M. excelsa 'Rangitoto'	mid-1980s	Dark Red	Tom Johnson / Dawn Nurseries	Upright, smallish tree. Sourced from Te Atatū, Auckland from a plant originally sourced on Rangitoto Island.
M. excelsa 'Royal Flame'	1988	Deep-crimson	Jim Rumbal / Duncan & Davies	Upright tree, flowers have contrasting yellow anthers. Sourced from Waitara West Marine Park.
M. excelsa 'Scarlet Pimpernel'	1976	Scarlet	Felix Jury / Duncan & Davies	Small, compact growth. Suitable for containers & patios. Sourced from Princess Street, Waitara.
M. excelsa 'Sunglow'	1980	-	Duncan & Davies	Variegated with gold leaf margins. flowers and form. Thought to be sourced from Oswald Blumhardt, plant breeder in Whangarei.
M. excelsa 'Tamaki'	1985	Orange-red	Graeme Platt	Bright flowers. Sourced from Tamaki Drive, Auckland.
M. excelsa 'Te Kaha'	mid-1980s	Red with orange hints.	Graeme Platt	Medium-sized bushy tree. Sourced from Te Kaha Hotel, Bay of Plenty.
M. excelsa 'Titirangi'	late-1980s	Scarlet	Graeme Platt	Erect tree with copious flowers. Sourced from Margan Ave, Auckland near the Titirangi Golf Course.
M. excelsa 'Upper Hutt'	-	-	-	Reverse-variegated foliage. Sourced from public gardens in Upper Hutt.
M. excelsa 'Variegata'	-	Red	-	Variegated leaves. Not to be confused with M. kermadecensis. 'Variegata'.
M. excelsa 'Vibrance'	1985	Orange-red	Graeme Platt	Flowers have exceptionally long stamens. Sourced from Waiomu Bay, Coromandel Peninsula.
M. excelsa 'Whakarewarewa'	late-1980s	Very dark red	Graeme Platt	Sourced from Whakarewarewa, Rotorua.
M. excelsa 'White Caps'	2009	White	Graeme Platt	Sourced from Piha Beach, Auckland.

== Notable pōhutukawa ==
A giant pōhutukawa at Te Araroa on the East Coast is reputed to be the largest in the country, with a height of 20 metres and a spread of 38 metres (125 ft).

A pōhutukawa tree with an estimated age of 180 years known as 'Te Hā' is fully established at an Auckland City park. 'Te Hā' is the largest urban specimen in the country. Plans to build a monument in honour of victims of the Erebus Disaster in proximity to the tree activated significant local opposition in 2021.

== See also ==
- Metrosideros robusta, also known as northern rātā – Species of tree endemic to New Zealand
- Metrosideros umbellata, also known as southern rātā – Species of flowering plant
- Metrosideros bartlettii, also known as Bartlett's rātā – Species of flowering plant
- Metrosideros parkinsonii, also known as Parkinson's rātā – Species of tree endemic to New Zealand
- Invasive species of New Zealand origin
- Nuytsia floribunda, also known as Australian Christmas tree – Genus of mistletoes
- Christmas in New Zealand
