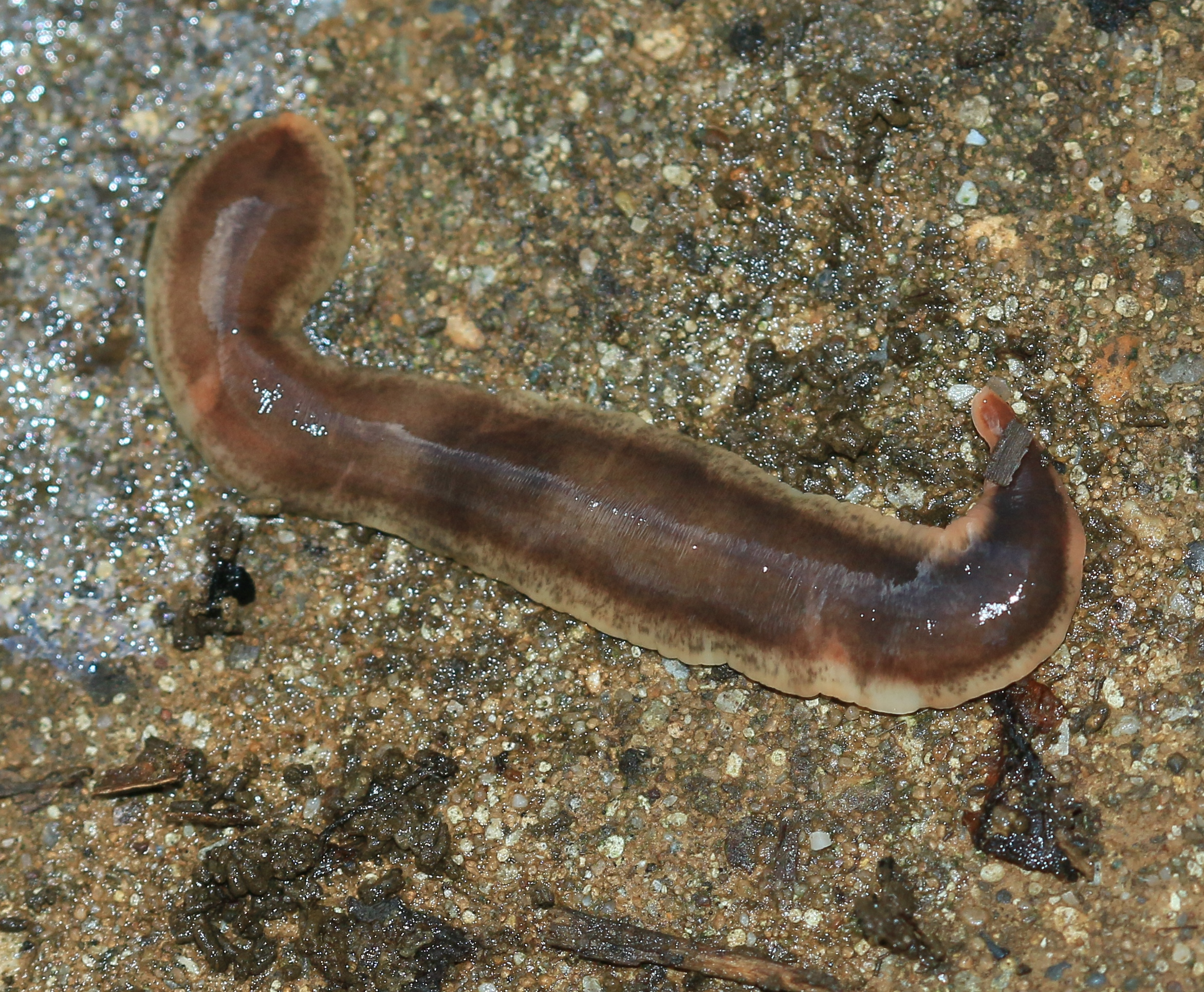

Scientific classification
- Kingdom: Animalia
- Phylum: Platyhelminthes
- Order: Tricladida
- Family: Geoplanidae
- Genus: Arthurdendyus
- Species: A. triangulatus

Binomial name
- Arthurdendyus triangulatus (Dendy, 1896) Jones, 1999

Synonyms
- Artioposthia triangulata (Dendy, 1896); Geoplana triangulata Dendy, 1896

= New Zealand flatworm =

Species of flatworm

The New Zealand flatworm (Arthurdendyus triangulatus) is a large land flatworm native to New Zealand. It can vary from 5 mm in length when hatched to approximately 17 centimetres (6.7 in) in mature adults.

The New Zealand flatworm is considered an invasive species in parts of Europe. This species is included since 2019 in the list of invasive alien species of Union concern (the Union list). This implies that this species cannot be imported, bred, transported, commercialized, or intentionally released into the environment in the whole of the European Union.

== Description ==
The ventral surface of the flatworm is a pale buff colour while the dorsal surface is dark brown. Young flatworms vary in colour from white to pale orange and develop their adult colouration as they grow.

During the day, flatworms can be found resting on the surface of soil underneath objects in close contact with the ground. They may also be found beneath the soil surface hunting for earthworms.

Reproduction involves the production of egg capsules of about 8 mm in length. The capsules are shiny, flexible and cherry red in colour at first and later darken to black after several days. After an unknown incubation period, several pale, tiny flatworms hatch out of the brittle capsule. One egg capsule is produced at a time with the bulge clearly visible in the dorsum of the adult worm.

=== Locomotion ===
When at rest, A. triangulatus rolls itself up and can appear like a very tiny Swiss roll. When it starts to move, it uncurls, at the same time as the circular muscles beneath the epidermal cells at the anterior end contract. The paler head-end extends forward, becoming as thin as the lead in a pencil. During movement it is repeatedly raised a couple of millimetres from the substratum before being lowered again. As movement continues, circular, diagonal and longitudinal muscles in the rest of the body contract. Friction between the ventral surface and the substratum is reduced by mucus produced by the ciliated epidermal cells. A. triangulatus can achieve speeds of up to 17 m per hour.

== Invasive species ==
The New Zealand flatworm is an invasive species in Europe, feeding there almost exclusively on earthworms. This degrades soil quality. European earthworm predators are reluctant to eat it although cases of frogs and beetle larvae consuming flatworms have been recorded. It has been seen in England, Scotland, Northern Ireland, the Republic of Ireland and the Faroe Islands. It might have arrived in the early 1960s, being first recorded in Belfast in 1963. The New Zealand flatworm is easily transported accidentally in plant pots in adult or egg form. They tend to be common in garden centres and may have arrived in the UK with exotic plants.

It has been suggested that they might thrive in parts of western Norway, southern Sweden, Denmark, Germany and northern parts of Poland, if they invade these regions.

Similar invasions of other terrestrial planarians are occurring in many other parts of the world. For example, planarians of the genus Bipalium are widely distributed in North America, and planarians of the genus Platydemus on many islands in the Pacific. Platydemus manokwari has recently (2013) been found in Europe.

== Molecular characterisation ==
The complete mitogenome of the New Zealand flatworm is 20,309 bp in length and contains repetitions that includes two types of tandem-repeats. More than a quarter of the mitogenome is constituted by non-coding DNA. The mitogenome displays a 32-bp overlap between the genes ND4L and ND4, and the ND5 gene is terminated by the presence of tRNA-Ser. The cytochrome c oxidase subunit 2 gene is of unusual length, with a cox2 encoded protein 446 aa in length (compared to about 250 aa in other geoplanids); this characteristic of a very long cox2 is also found in other members of the subfamily Rhynchodeminae, to which A. triangulatus belongs.

The genome of the New Zealand flatworm includes two paralogous ribosomal RNA clusters (in contrast to other animals which have only one cluster), a unique characteristic found only in members of the family Geoplanidae and a few other families of flatworms.

== See also ==
- Invasive species of New Zealand origin
- Australian flatworm
