= Christmas in New Zealand =

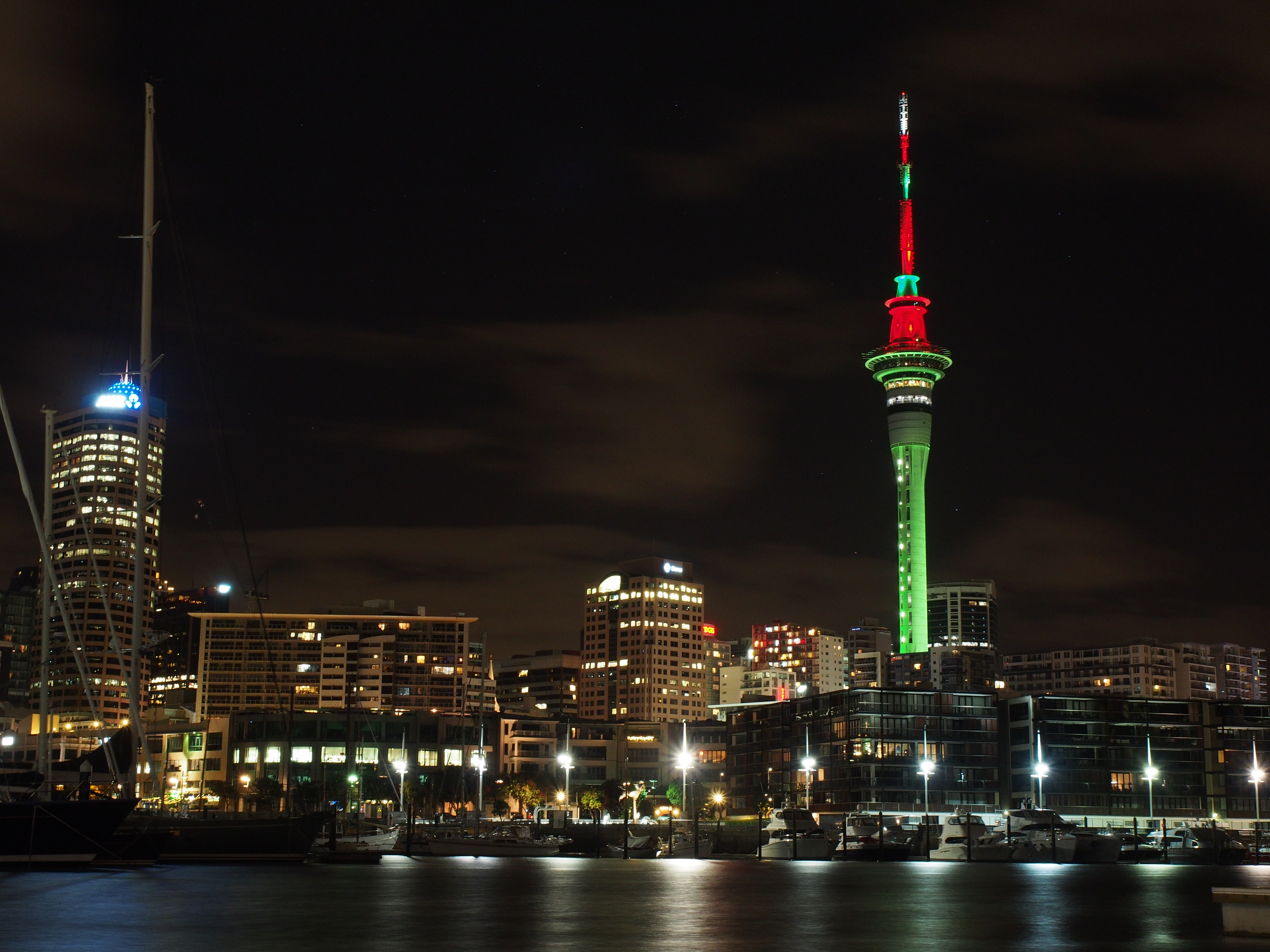
Auckland's Sky Tower illuminated in Christmas colours during the month of December

Christmas traditions in New Zealand—like those in Australia—incorporate Christian, British and North American Christmas traditions, including biblical and winter iconography, as well as modern and local customs. As New Zealand is in the Southern Hemisphere, the holiday falls during the summer months, so it is often celebrated outdoors with barbeques, picnics, and trips to the beach. New Zealand Christmas dishes include summer fruits and vegetables, a variety of locally-produced meats and seafood, and pavlova dessert. Pōhutukawa are displayed as well as the traditional Northern European tree. Christian church celebrations are held on Christmas Eve and Christmas Day, with carols and hymns sung in both English and Māori.

Christmas (Māori: Kirihimete) became widely celebrated by Christians in the late 19th century. Today, Christmas Day and Boxing Day are both statutory holidays in New Zealand, and Christmas is celebrated by both Christians and non-Christians. While Boxing Day is a standard statutory holiday, Christmas Day is one of the few days of the year where all but the most essential businesses and services must close.

== History ==
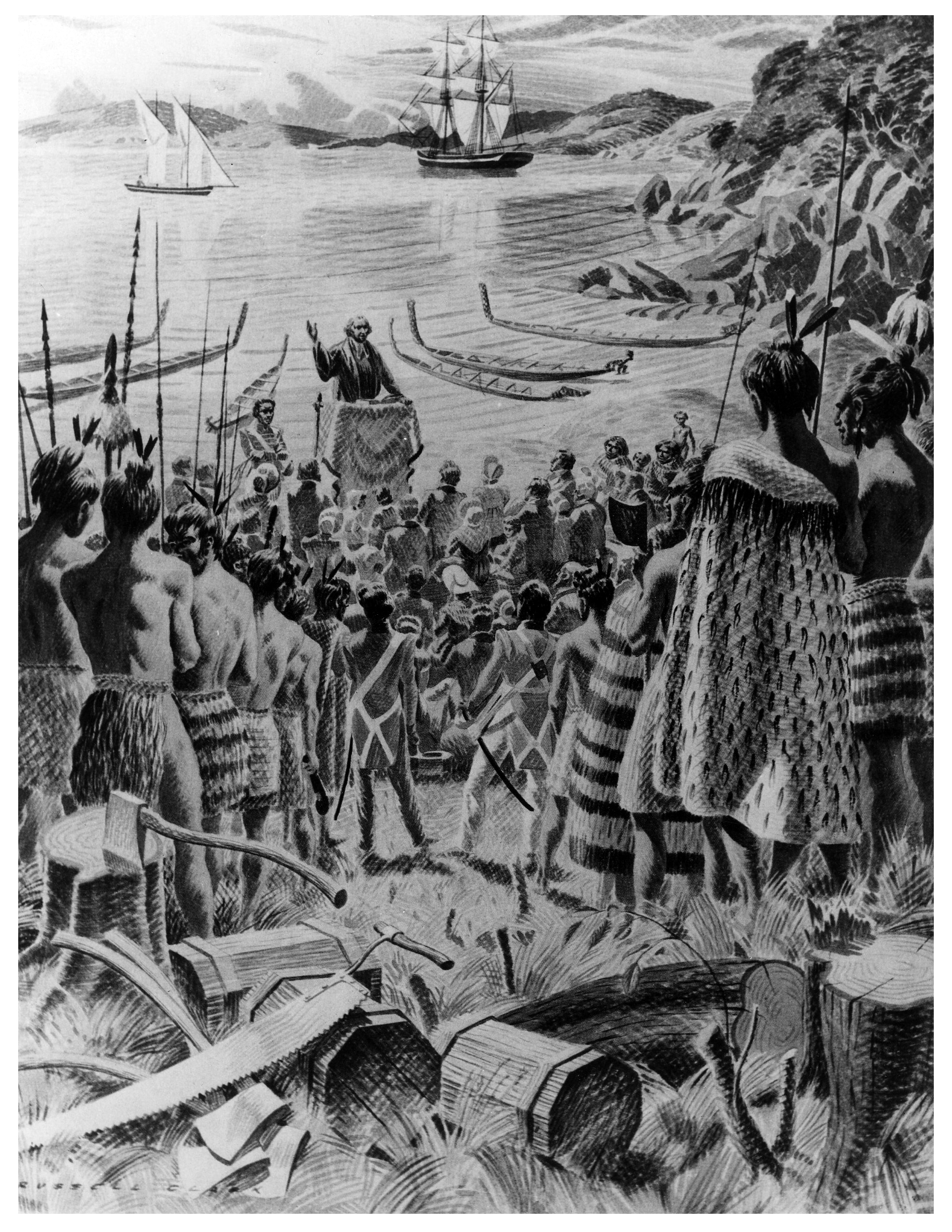
Depiction of the sermon by Rev. Samuel Marsden at Oihi Bay, Christmas Day 1814

The Christian festival of Christmas was introduced to New Zealand by missionaries in the early 19th century. The first recorded Christmas service on New Zealand shores was in 1814, with Anglican priest Samuel Marsden delivering a sermon to around 400 Māori at Oihi Bay in the Bay of Islands, at the invitation of chiefs Te Pahi and Ruatara.

In the mid 19th century observance of the Christmas holiday varied along sectarian grounds. English and Irish settlers, who were typically Anglicans and Catholics respectively, brought their own Christmas traditions. Scottish settlers did not widely celebrate Christmas as the Scottish Presbyterian church never placed much emphasis on the Christmas festival, on the grounds that it was unscriptural. In the late 19th century the Presbyterians began to embrace Christmas celebrations, and as sectarianism between the different ethnic communities decreased the holiday became widely observed by all New Zealanders—albeit as a low-key, private affair until the late 20th century.

Christmas Day became a bank holiday following the Bank Holidays Act 1873, and all workers were entitled to a day off for Christmas as a result of the Industrial Conciliation and Arbitration Act 1894. The Public Holidays Act 1910 further established Christmas Day and "the day after Christmas Day" (Boxing Day) as non-working days.

== Imagery and decorations ==
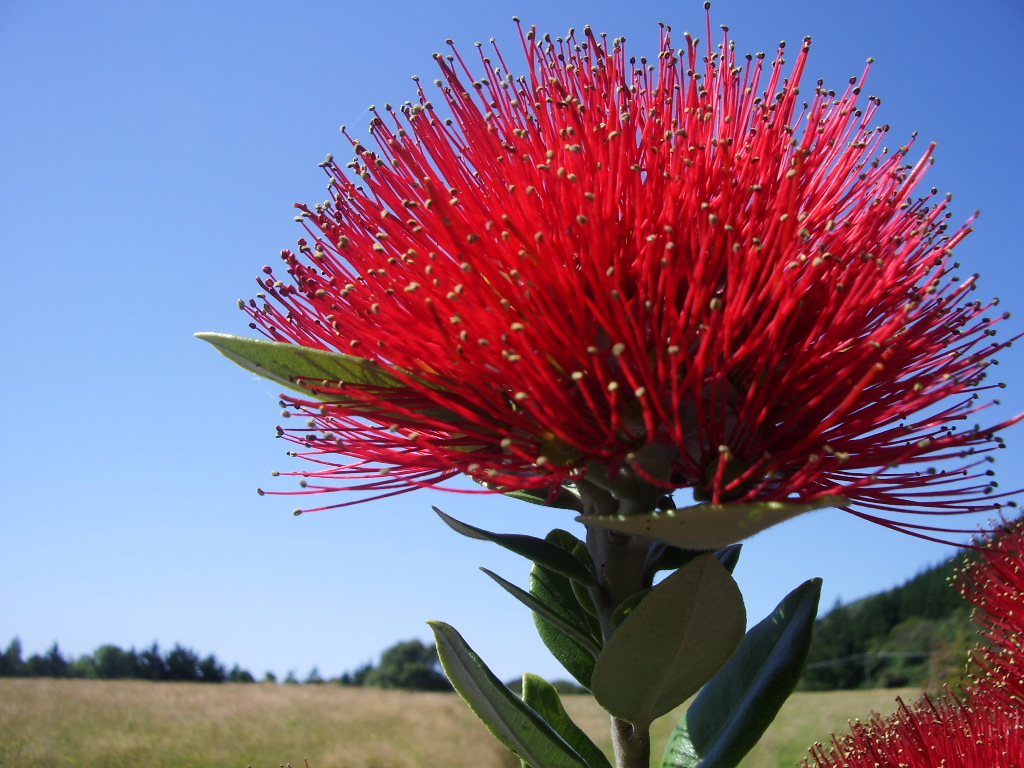
The December-flowering pōhutukawa (Metrosideros excelsa) is an often-used Christmas symbol in New Zealand.

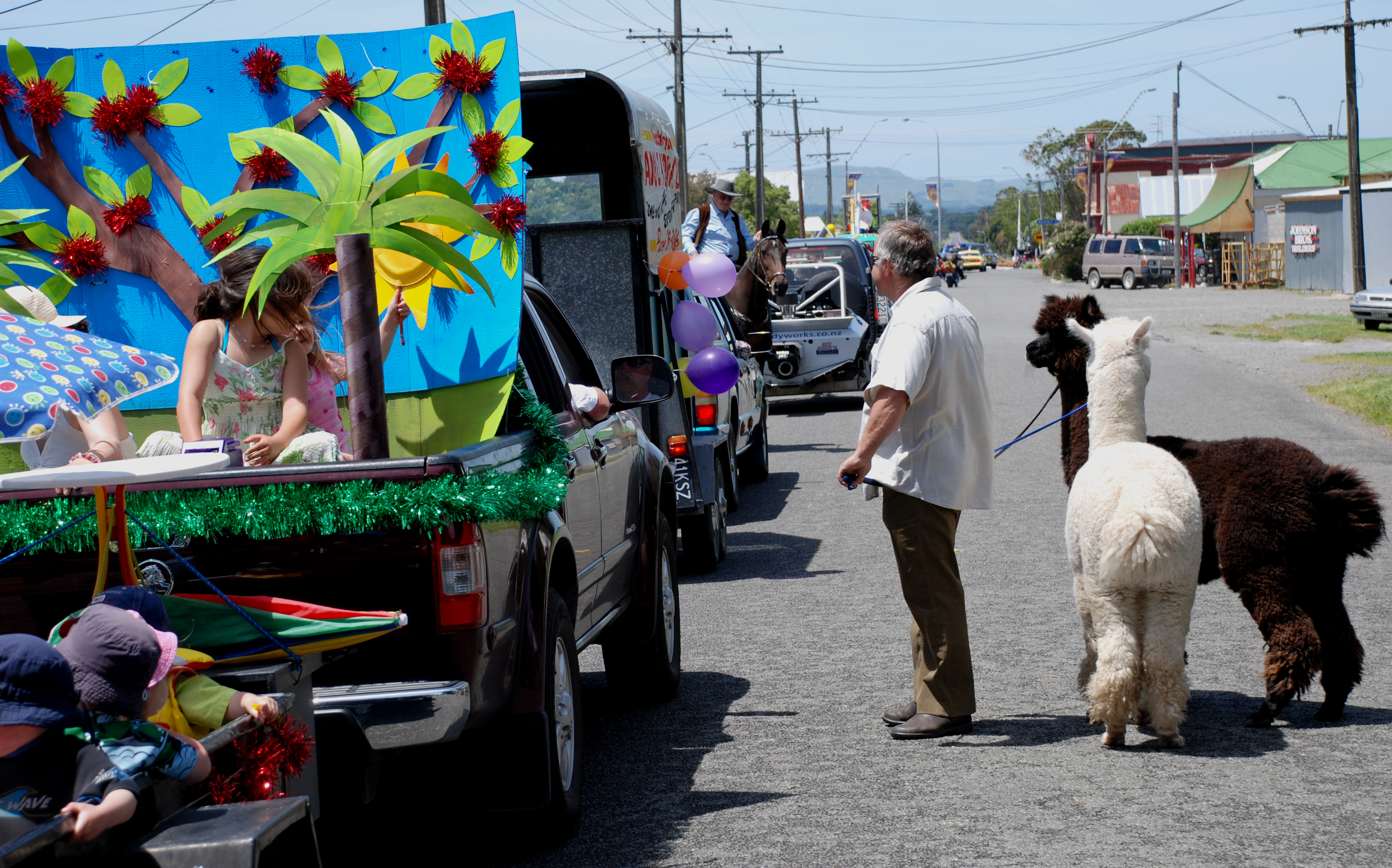
Christmas parade in Featherston incorporating New Zealand iconography and flora

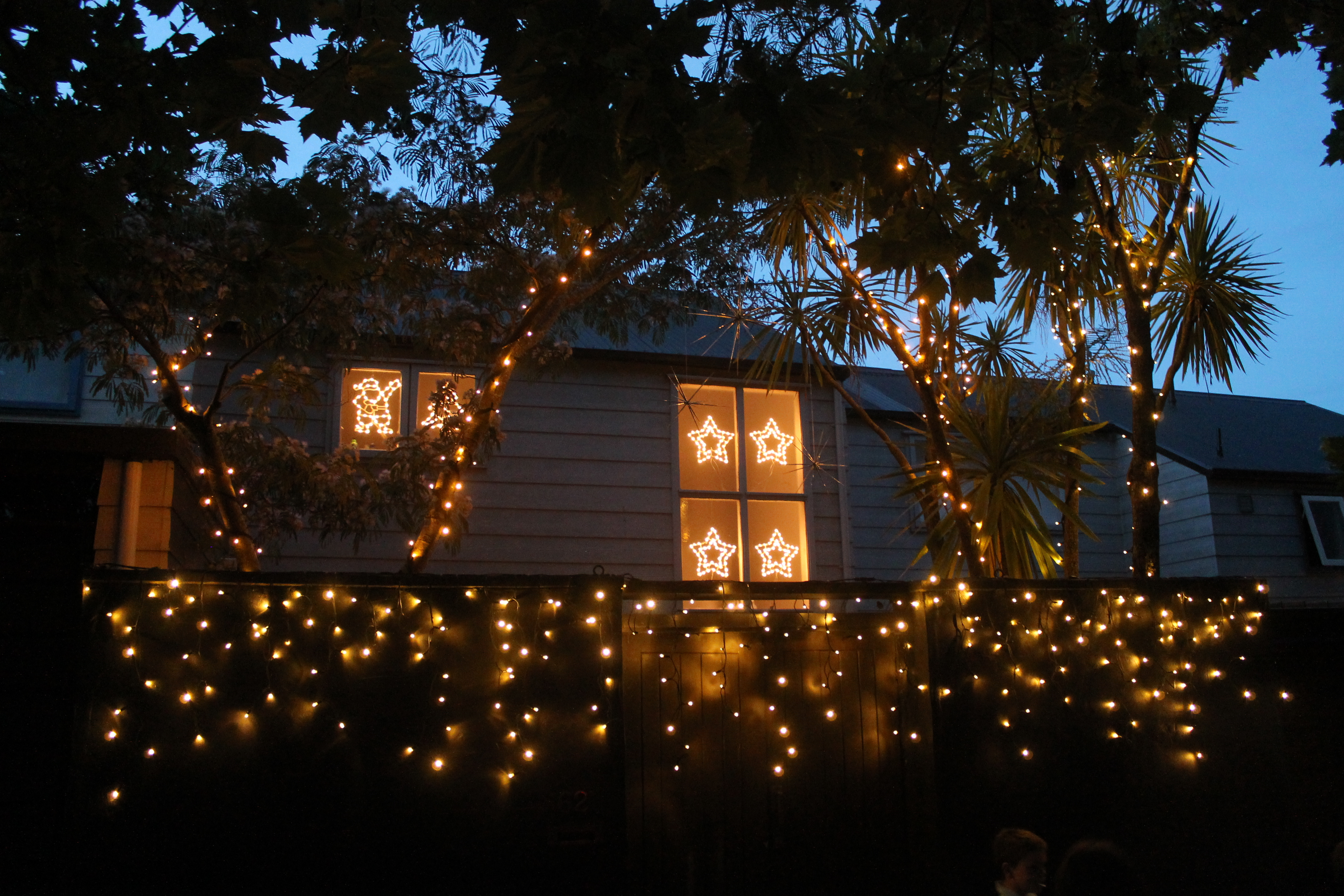
Lights on houses and cabbage trees in Freemans Bay, Auckland

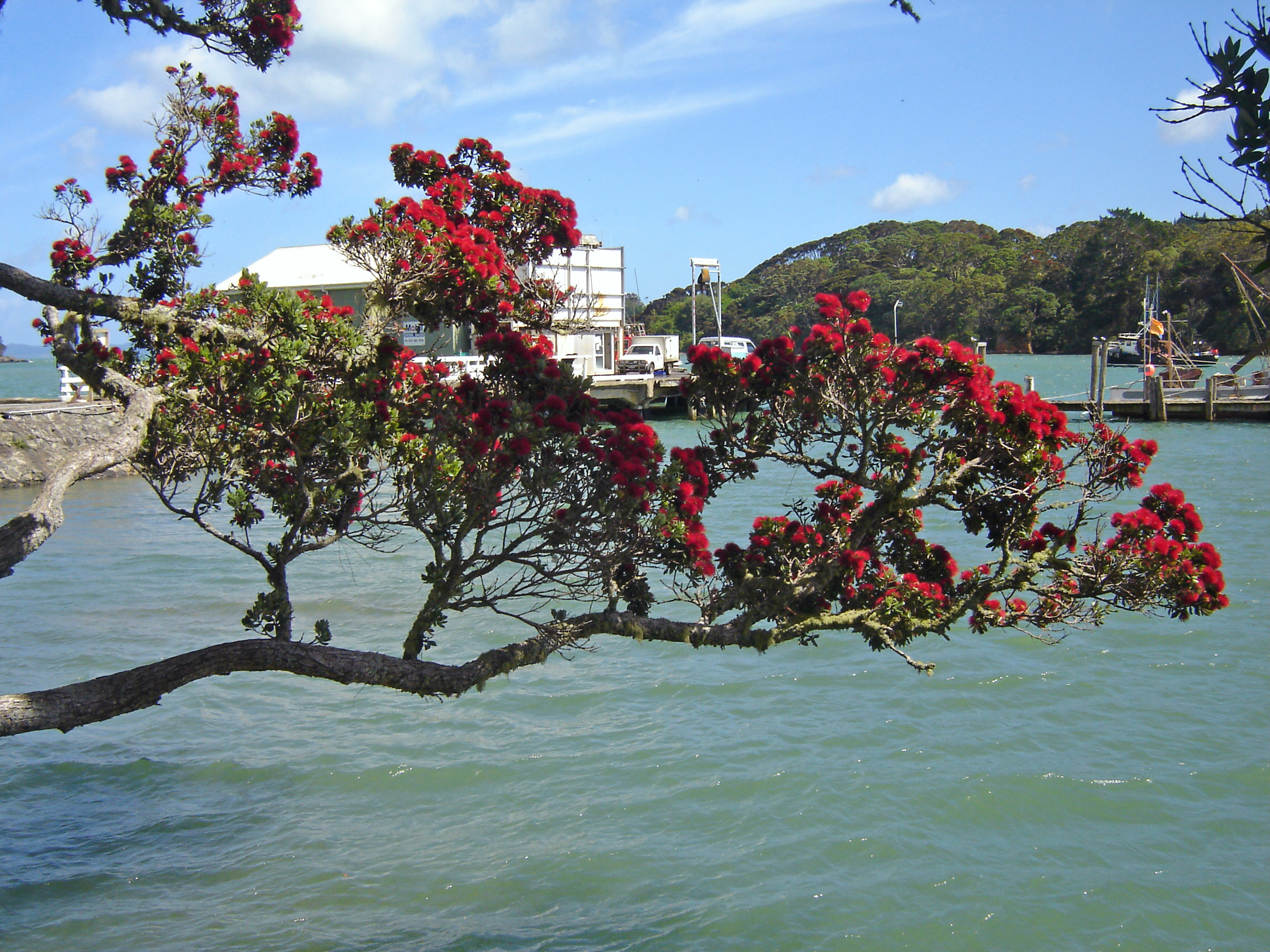
Pōhutukawa branch in Mangōnui

New Zealanders celebrate Christmas with traditional Northern Hemisphere winter and biblical imagery mixed with local imagery. Native plants, ferns, and flaxes are displayed alongside traditional Christmas flowers such as mistletoe, and biblical stars and angels. The pōhutukawa, which produces large crimson flowers in December, is an often used symbol for Christmas in New Zealand, and subsequently the pōhutukawa has become known as the New Zealand Christmas tree.

Some homeowners decorate the exterior of their houses. Displays range from the modest to elaborate, sometimes with hundreds of lights and decorations depicting seasonal motifs such as Christmas trees, Santa Claus, reindeer, or nativity scenes. Particular regions have a tradition for elaborate displays, and attract a great amount of pedestrian and vehicular traffic during the Christmas season. This is despite the longer days, with dusk ranging from 9:05 p.m. in Gisborne (New Zealand's most northeasterly city) to as late as 10:20 p.m. in Invercargill (the most southwesterly city).

== Food ==
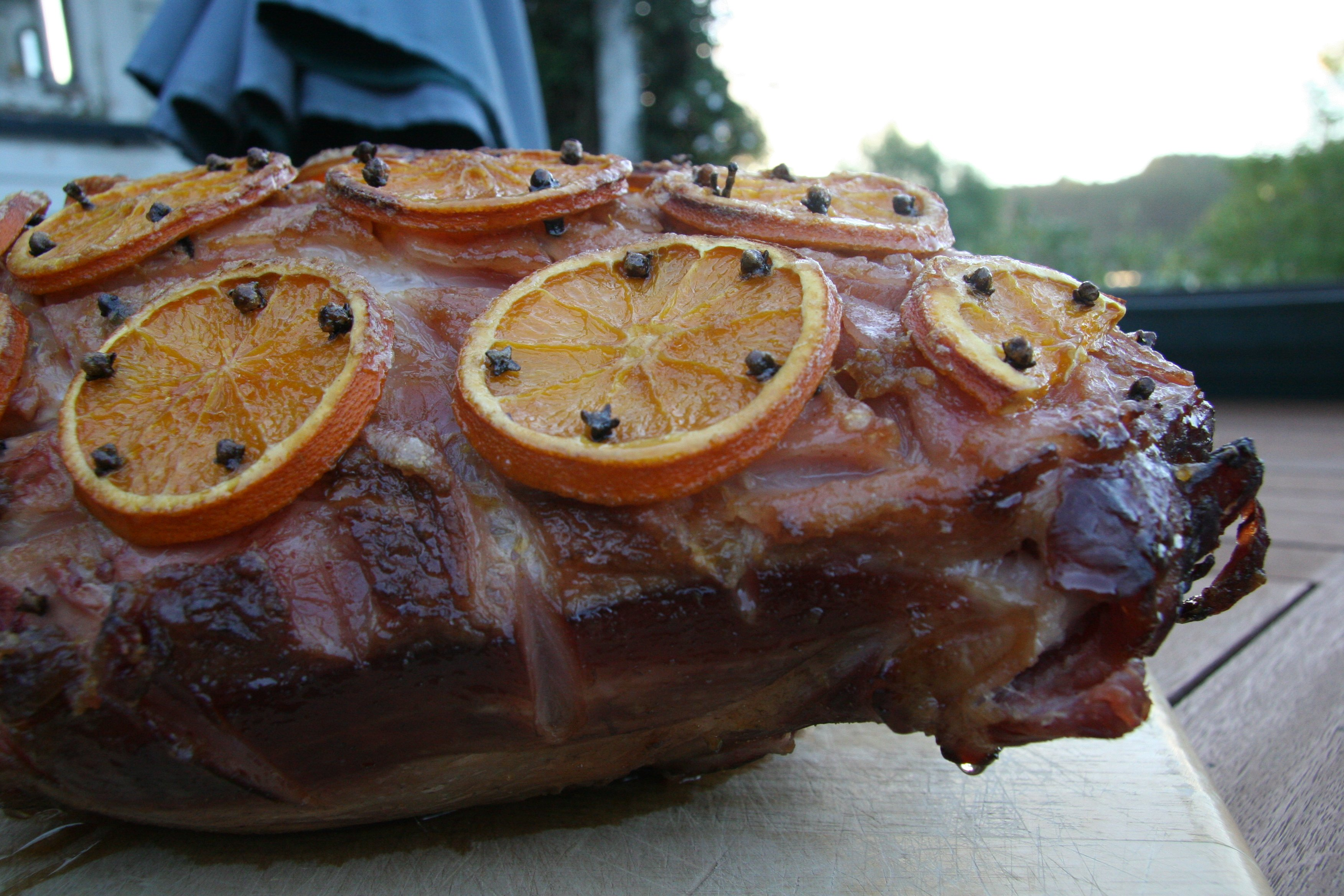
Glazed ham with orange slices and cloves. Ham and lamb are the most popular Christmas meat in New Zealand and enjoy near-equal popularity.

Families traditionally gather for a Christmas lunch. While a formal dinner indoors remains traditional, barbecue lunches have increased in popularity since the 2000s, with around 43% of New Zealanders having a barbecue lunch in 2019. Cultural cooking methods such as hāngī, umu and lovo are also commonly used in Christmas celebrations.

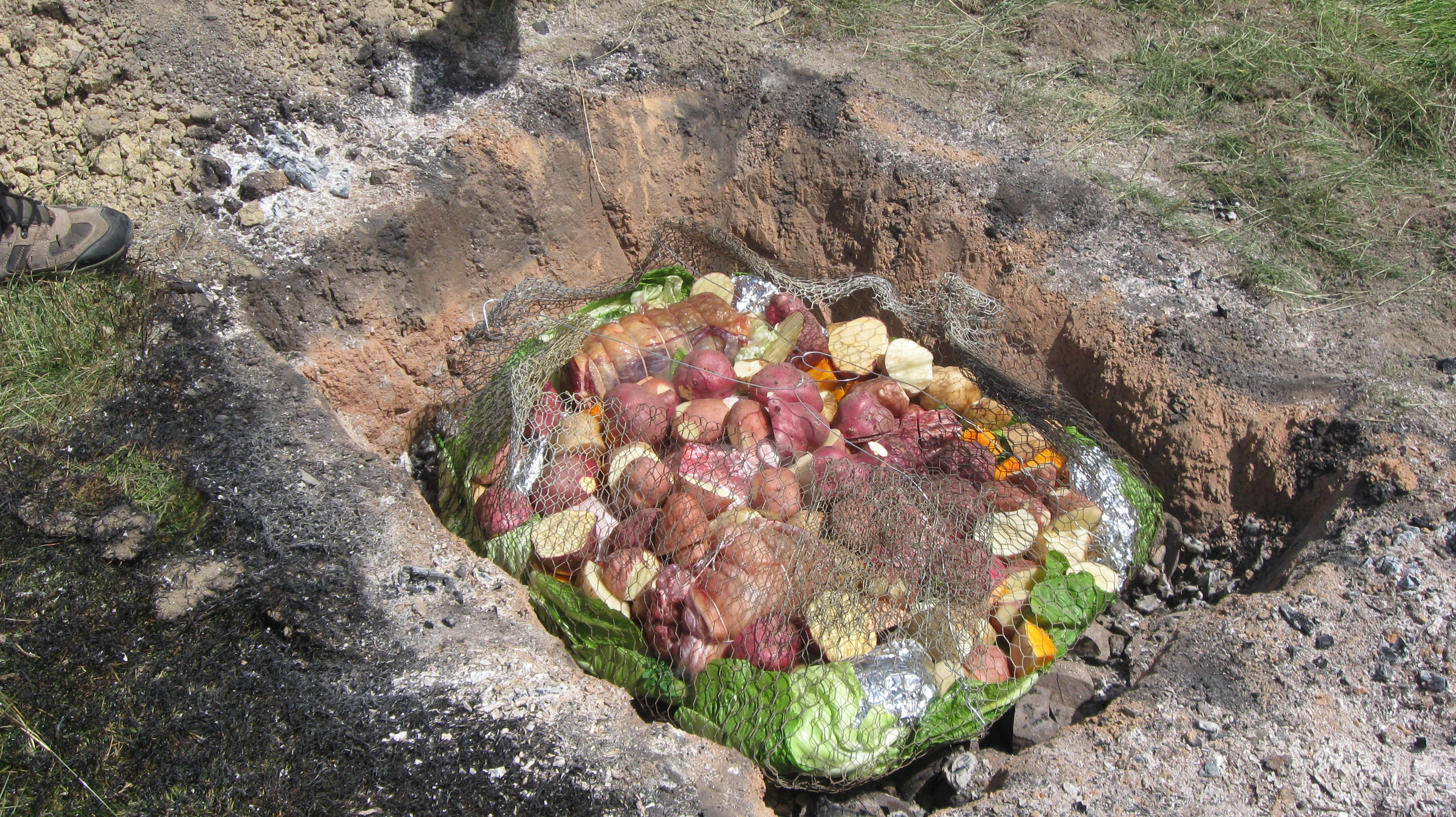
A summer hāngī, December 2010

Christmas lunches commonly include hot meat, with lamb and ham being the most popular, root vegetables such as potato and kūmara (sweet potato), and a variety of salads. As appropriate for the often warm summer temperatures of the day, it has become popular to serve cold meats and seafood. Traditional Northern Hemisphere Christmas foods, such as turkey and brussels sprouts, were common in the past and continue to be eaten by a minority. Similarly, sweet dishes include both traditional British Christmas desserts (such as Christmas cake, Christmas pudding, fruit mince pies, and trifle) and local desserts such as pavlova topped with summer fruits (such as strawberries and raspberries) or kiwifruit.

== Parades and music ==
Several Christmas themed parades are held in New Zealand. A popular event is Auckland's Santa Parade down Queen Street. This features numerous floats and marching bands and attracts large crowds every year. It is held late November to accommodate holidaymakers and is seen as the preamble to the later festivities. The tradition of Carols by Candlelight is popular in New Zealand. In Auckland and Christchurch there are usually large outdoor concerts known as Christmas in the Park.

Numerous recordings of original and adapted Christmas songs have been made since 1949, when the TANZA label was founded.

== Religious observances ==
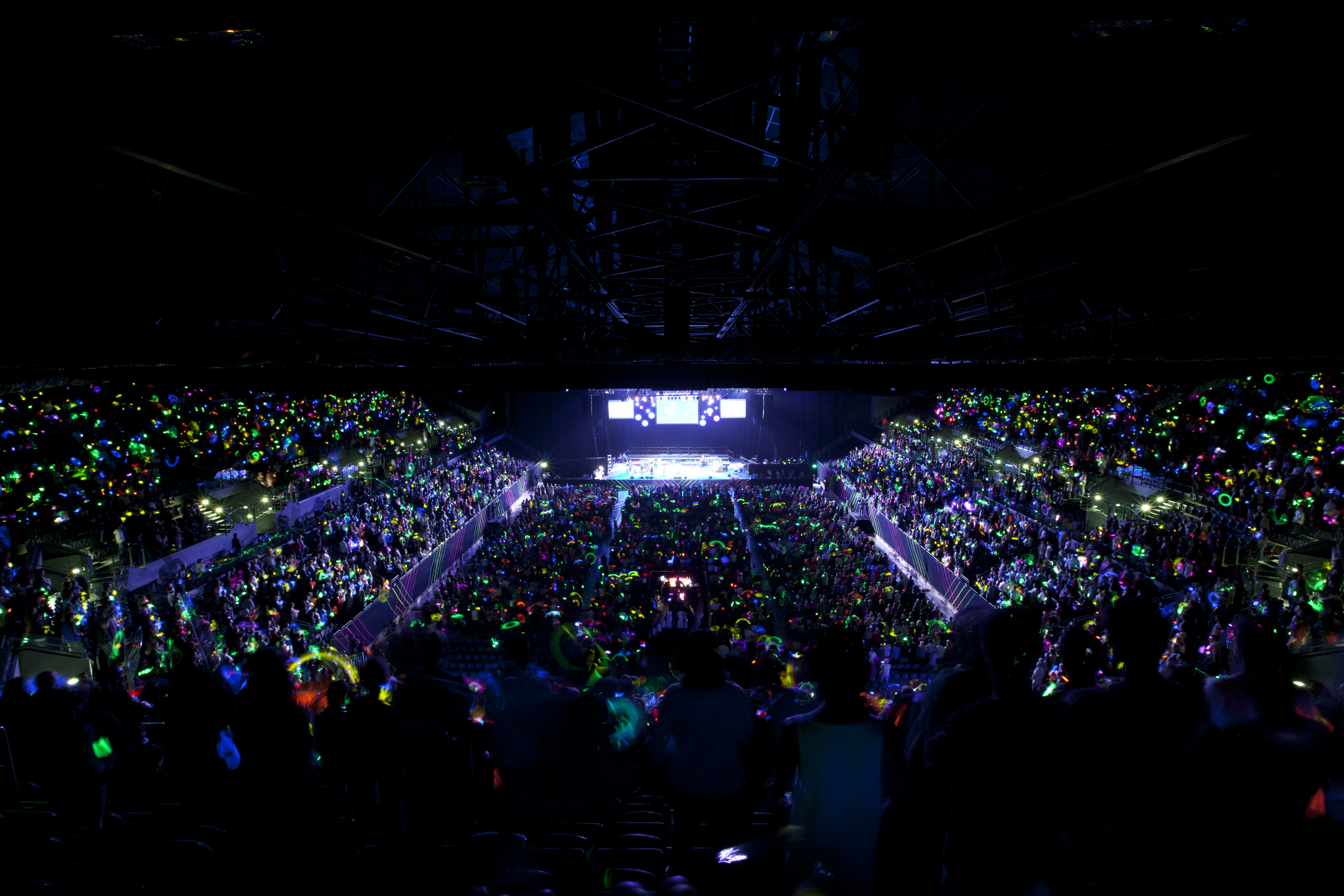
10,000 Aucklanders celebrated Christmas waving glow sticks at the 2011 GLOW carol event at Vector Arena, created and produced by St Paul's church.

Christianity is the most common religion in New Zealand, with 37.3 percent of the population at the 2018 census identified as Christian, with Anglicanism being the largest denomination. In a 2006 survey only 10 percent of those surveyed thought that religion was the most important part of Christmas, although the religious importance of Christmas was respected. 26 percent said 'going to church' was important and 41 percent said it was not. 31 percent said 'carols by candlelight' was important and 37 percent said it was not. About two-thirds said the best thing about Christmas was time spent with family.

From 2009 to 2013, St Paul's, Auckland produced the GLOW Carols by Glowstick event at Auckland's Vector Arena, with around 10,000 people attending each year. A key part of the event were Christmas films produced by St Paul's including The Christmas Story which has had 4 million views on YouTube. Their 2012 documentary short film O Little Town of Bethlehem was shot in modern Bethlehem. In December 2009 a billboard put up by St Matthew's, Auckland, showing Mary and Joseph in bed together drew global media attention as well as criticism from other churches. In 2022, Taranaki Cathedral displayed a large artwork with the words 'Cast Down The Mighty, Send The Rich Away' and 'Lift the Lowly, Fill the Hungry' from the King James Version of Luke 1:52-53. Critics said it wasn't 'Christmassy'.

In 2022, Auckland City Mission was expected to provide 10,000 parcels of food and tens of thousands of presents to people in need of support at Christmas time. Christian leaders invite New Zealanders to church celebrations focusing on the "love, grace, peace and salvation" that was brought by the birth of Jesus and to show "the goodness and love of God".

== Retail ==
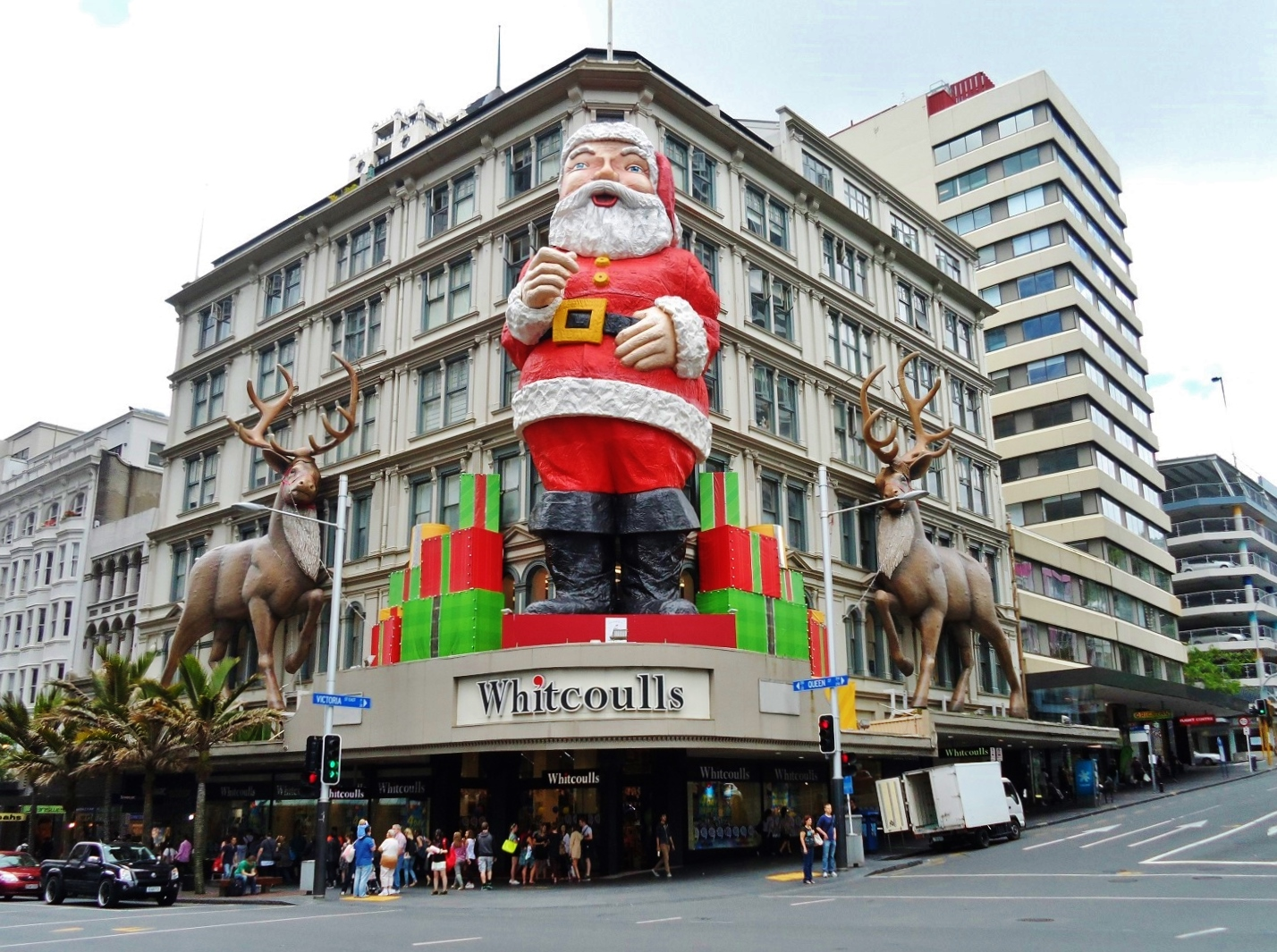
Christmas display, featuring a giant Santa Claus and reindeer, on a Whitcoulls on Queen Street, Auckland, 2013 (removed and relocated in 2020).

The lead-up to Christmas is the busiest shopping season in New Zealand. Paymark, who provides EFTPOS services to 70 percent of retailers, recorded a total spend of $8.6 billion of transactions through its network in the six weeks leading up to Christmas 2019. On Christmas Eve 2019, the Paymark network processed 199 transactions per second at peak times.

Black Friday sales began to be adopted by New Zealand retailers in 2013, largely to remain competitive with US-based online retailers. In 2015, major retailers such as The Warehouse, Noel Leeming and Harvey Norman offered Black Friday sales, and by 2018 were joined by Farmers, JB Hi-Fi, Briscoes and Rebel Sport. Paymark processed $253 million in transactions though its network on Black Friday 2019, overtaking Boxing Day for the first time.

== Media ==
As Christmas falls in summer, watching television is not as strong a part of New Zealand Christmas traditions as many Northern Hemisphere countries. Most regular television series and current affairs shows go off-air from mid-December to mid-to-late January. Before October 2025, no advertising was allowed on New Zealand television or radio on Christmas Day, a rule that also applied on Good Friday and Easter Sunday.

TVNZ 1 broadcasts the Royal Christmas Message at 6:50 pm. The message has broadcast every Christmas day since television was introduced in New Zealand in 1960. In a 2006 survey by Reader's Digest reported 20% of people said watching the Royal Christmas Message was important and 47% said it was not.
