= Christmas Lights Trail =

Annual event in Perth, Western Australia

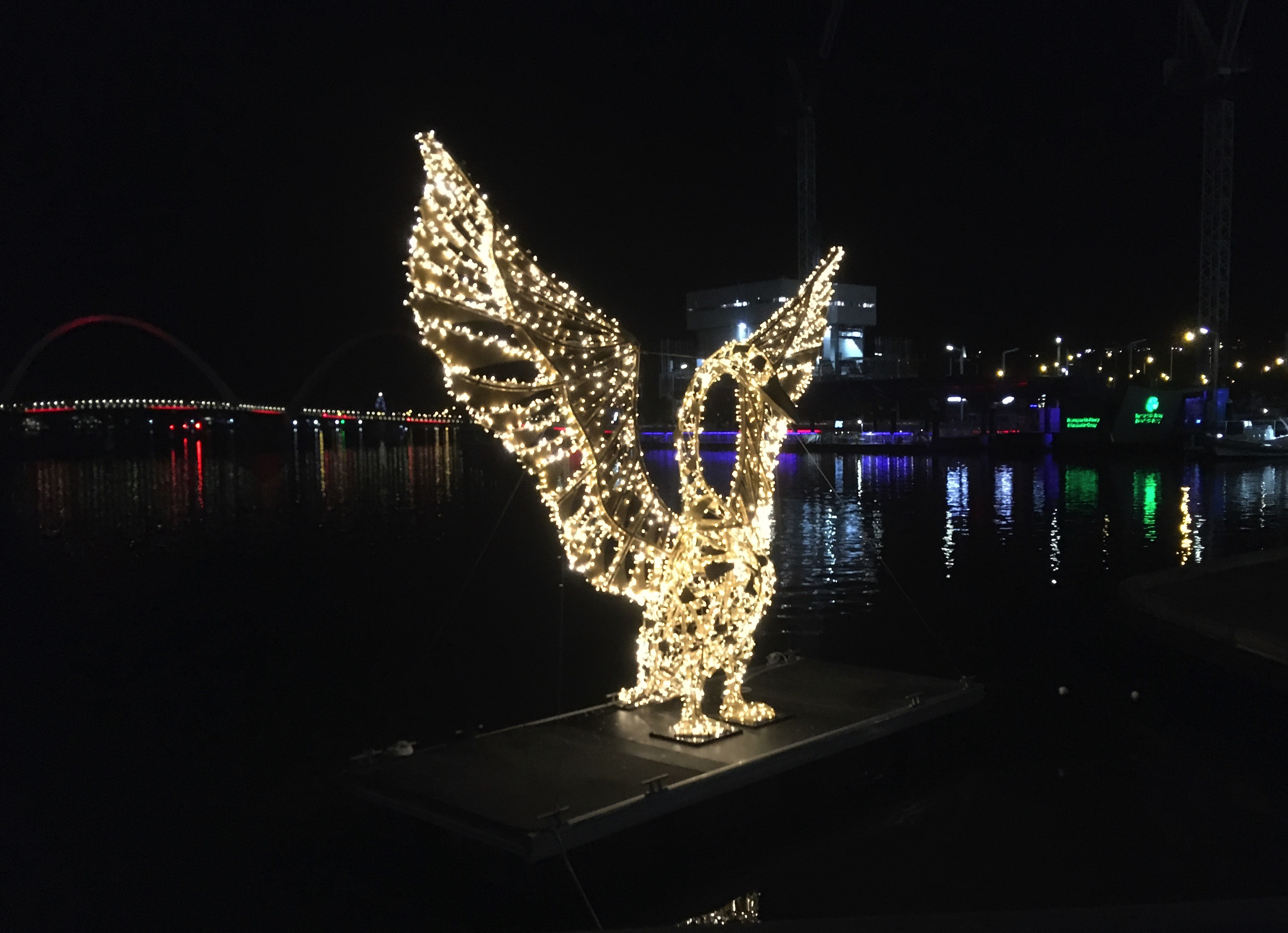
"Magical Swans" at Elizabeth Quay, 2020

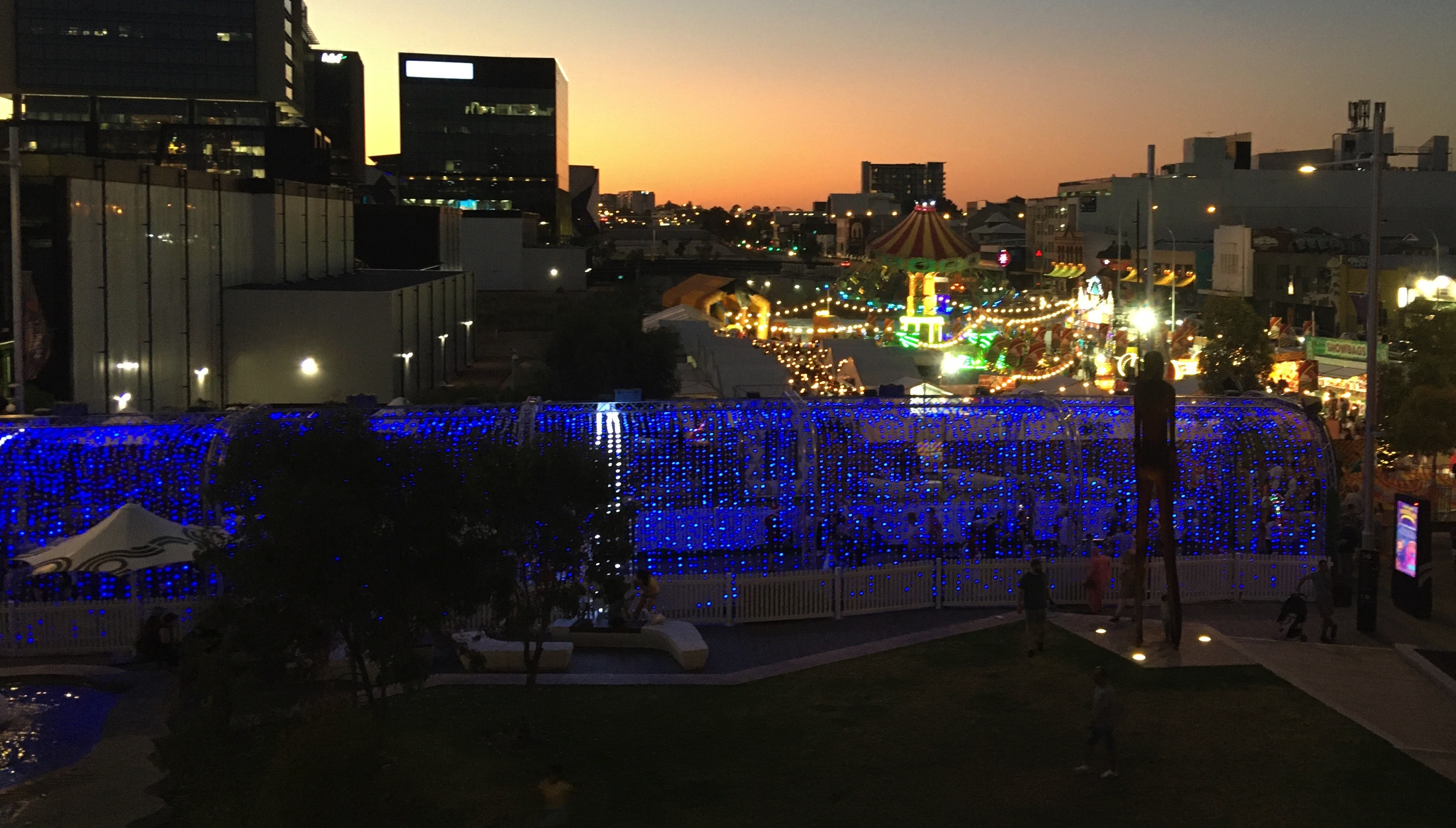
"Constellation Tunnel" at Yagan Square, 2020

The Christmas Lights Trail is an annual event run by the City of Perth, in which various light displays and projections, some of which are Christmas themed, are placed in and around the Perth central business district (CBD) in Western Australia. It runs from 6 pm to 11 pm each night, from late November to late December/early January each year.

The event first occurred in 2017, in which there were 16 displays around the Perth CBD and Northbridge. The Christmas Lights Trail replaced the Christmas tree lighting ceremony, which had run for 18 years prior, but had to be cancelled as it involved too many people in Forrest Place, which led to concerns of crowd crushing. The Christmas Lights Trail was a better alternative as is spread out crowds.

In 2018, there were 18 displays.

In 2019, there were 27 displays, including a new, smaller trail at Claisebrook Cove in East Perth. The event brought in approximately 333,000 visitors to the City of Perth.

In 2020, there was another new trail, this time in West Perth. There were 30 displays in total.

Since 2022, the Christmas Lights Trail has been sponsored by Rio Tinto.

== Displays ==
Some of the most popular displays include:

- "Christmas Projections" – an animated projection on the outside of St George's Cathedral
- "Council House Kangaroos" – seven kangaroos on the lawn outside Council House
- "Constellation Tunnel" – a 32-metre (105 ft) long tunnel in Yagan Square
