= Beckoning sign =

Hand gesture

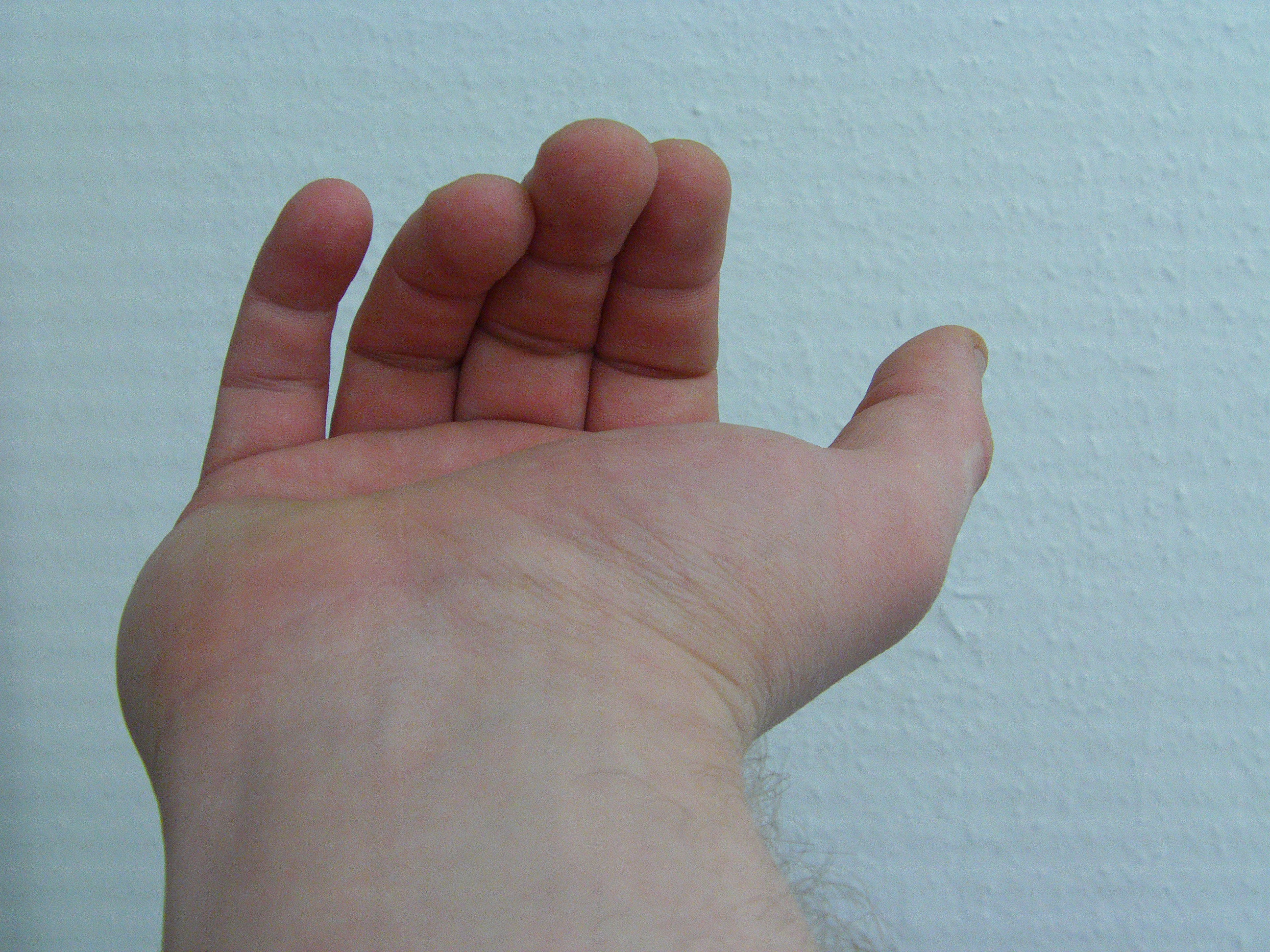
A hand in a beckoning position

A beckoning sign is a type of gesture intended to beckon or call-over someone or something. It is usually translated into "come here". This form of nonverbal communication varies from culture to culture, each having a relatively unique method of indicating invitation or enticement. Generally, this move is not recommended as it may imply contempt for the individual being beckoned.

== Around the world ==
=== United States ===
In the United States, the "beckoning finger" or the "beckoning palm" are the most common gestures implying beckoning. Both are accomplished by up-turning the palm, and extending and retracting either one or two fingers while keeping the rest clenched in a fist or by extending and retracting all of the fingers, all while keeping the palm upturned. This is mostly used for children but is considered very rude when used for adults.

=== Japan ===
The American beckoning sign is considered an insult in Japan, signifying a dog or other animal. To beckon in Japan, the hand is placed at head-level, palm facing down, and waved back and forward with the fingers pointing toward the ground.

== See also ==
- Gesture
- List of gestures
