= George Savin De Chanéet =

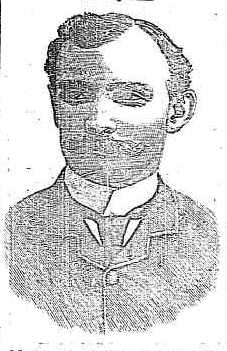
- Herr G S De Chaneet 1897

Background information
- Born: January 1, 1861; Hamburg, Germany
- Died: May 2, 1926 (aged 65) Java, Indonesia
- Occupations: Composer, conductor, teacher
- Years active: 1880-1910

George Savin De Chanéet was a Hungarian-Australian composer, conductor, choir master, organist and music teacher. He was born in Hamburg, only son of Frederich de Chanéet. He arrived in Melbourne on 22 April 1884, where he spent his active life, gaining naturalisation in 1899.

He dedicated much of his time to St Mary's Roman Catholic Church in West Melbourne, and composed church music for other parishes and denominations.

== Works ==
- Hungarian dance
- Mass for worship
- In the Cathedral (a Christmas song)
- The children's prayer : song / words by Louis Voight; music by G.S. de Chanéet
- Summer dreams : song / words by Louis Voight; music by G.S. de Chanéet
- The children's prayer : song / words by Louis Voight; music by G.S. de Chanéet
- The two cities : song / words by Margery Browne; music by G.S. De Chanéet
- The rover : song / words by Margery Browne; music by G.S. de Chanéet
- The goblin bat : song / words by Margery Browne; music by G.S. de Chanéet

== Personal ==
His first wife, Johanna Julianna (née Paasch), died in Melbourne in September 1887 in childbirth. De Chanéet then married Martha Matilda Orams (died 1930 in Surabaya) in December the same year. They had a daughter, Myra Matilda (born 1888) and two sons, Victor (born 1895) and Eric George (born 1902). Victor served in the AIF in World War I, winning the Military Medal for bravery in the field in 1918.

De Chanéet had moved to Java before June 1920. He died in Lawang on 2 May 1926, survived by his wife and three children.
