= Cesare Cutolo =

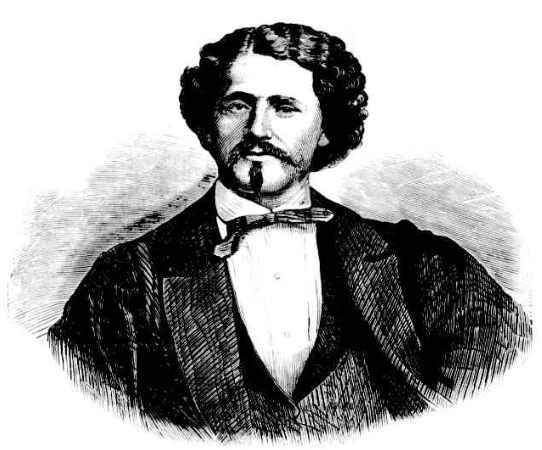
- Cesare Cutolo 1867

Background information
- Born: 1 January 1826
- Died: 20 February 1867 (aged 41)
- Occupation: Composer
- Years active: 1856–1867

Cesare Cutolo (1826-1867) was an Italian-Australian composer of romantic music. His Magnum Opus was a Victorian Christmas Waltz. He was killed in a boating accident. A memorial concert was held in his name on 21 February 1867 with proceeds collected to present to his wife.

== Works ==
- The Victorian Christmas waltz
- Song of the volunteers with words by H. E. Smith
- Remembrances of the Pyramids : nocturne / by C. Cutolo
- Come where my love lies dreaming
- Hail fair Australia / words by Ellie; music by Cutolo
- March and Chorus
- Oh, Gently breathe with lyrics by J. R. Thomas

== Recordings ==
- The Victorian Christmas waltz, arranged by Richard Divall in Australia unite! : the road to Federation : songs and dances of colonial Australia. OCLC Number: 224672714
