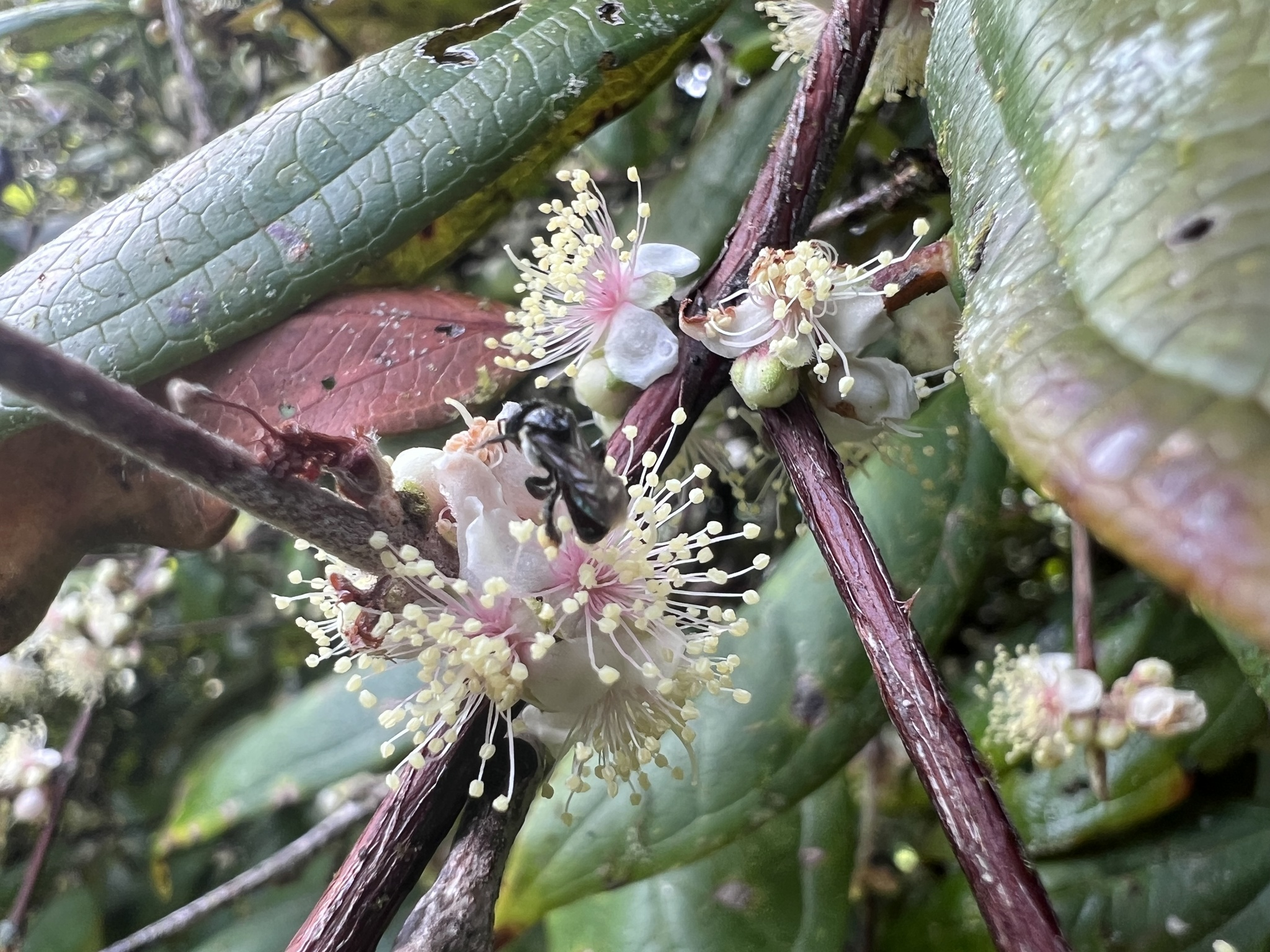
- Flowers

Conservation status
- Endangered (NCA)

Scientific classification
- Kingdom: Plantae
- Clade: Embryophytes
- Clade: Tracheophytes
- Clade: Spermatophytes
- Clade: Angiosperms
- Clade: Eudicots
- Clade: Rosids
- Order: Myrtales
- Family: Myrtaceae
- Genus: Rhodamnia
- Species: R. sessiliflora

Binomial name
- Rhodamnia sessiliflora Benth.

= Rhodamnia sessiliflora =

Iron malletwood

Species of flowering plant

Rhodamnia sessiliflora, commonly known as iron malletwood, is a small tree in the eucalyptus family Myrtaceae, found only in the Wet Tropics bioregion of Queensland, Australia.

== Description ==
Rhodamnia sessiliflora is a small tree up to 10 m (33 ft) tall, and the trunk may be buttressed. The new shoots and young twigs are clothed in very fine pale or white hairs, and leaves are simple (undivided) and without lobes or teeth on the margins. They are arranged in opposite pairs on the twigs, on petioles up to 8 mm (0.31 in) long. Leaves are ovate to elliptic and measure up to 13 cm (5.1 in) long by 6 cm (2.4 in) wide. They have two intramarginal veins, a feint one very close to the margin and a conspicuous one about 5 mm (0.20 in) inside the margin.

Flowers are produced in small clusters in the leaf axils—i.e. in the angle between the petiole and the twig. They have four cream or white petals about 3 mm (0.12 in) long. The fruit is a globose, purple or black berry about 1 cm (0.39 in) diameter, containing anywhere from 14 to 40 small seeds about 3 mm (0.12 in) long.

=== Phenology ===
Flowering occurs from October to July and fruit appear from December to June.

== Taxonomy ==
This species was first described in 1867 by the English botanist George Bentham, and published in his book Flora Australiensis: a description of the plants of the Australian territory. He chose the species epithet sessilis due to the plant having sessile (i.e. stemless) flowers and fruit.

== Distribution and habitat ==
Rhodamnia sessiliflora is restricted to coastal and subcoastal parts of northeastern Queensland, extending from about Rossville south to the Paluma Range National Park. It grows in well developed rainforest and monsoon forest on various soils, at altitudes from near sea level to about 1,000 m (3,300 ft).

== Ecology ==
Fruit of this tree are eaten by cassowaries (Casuarius casuarius), figbirds (Sphecotheres vieilloti), spotted catbirds (Ailuroedus maculosus) and Lewin's honeyeaters (Meliphaga lewinii).

== Diseases and conservation ==
As a plant in the Myrtaceae family, this species is susceptible to the introduced pathogen Puccinia psidii—commonly known as myrtle rust—and is in rapid decline. It is listed as endangered under the Queensland Government's Nature Conservation Act. As of 17 September 2024, it has not been assessed by the International Union for Conservation of Nature (IUCN).

== Gallery ==
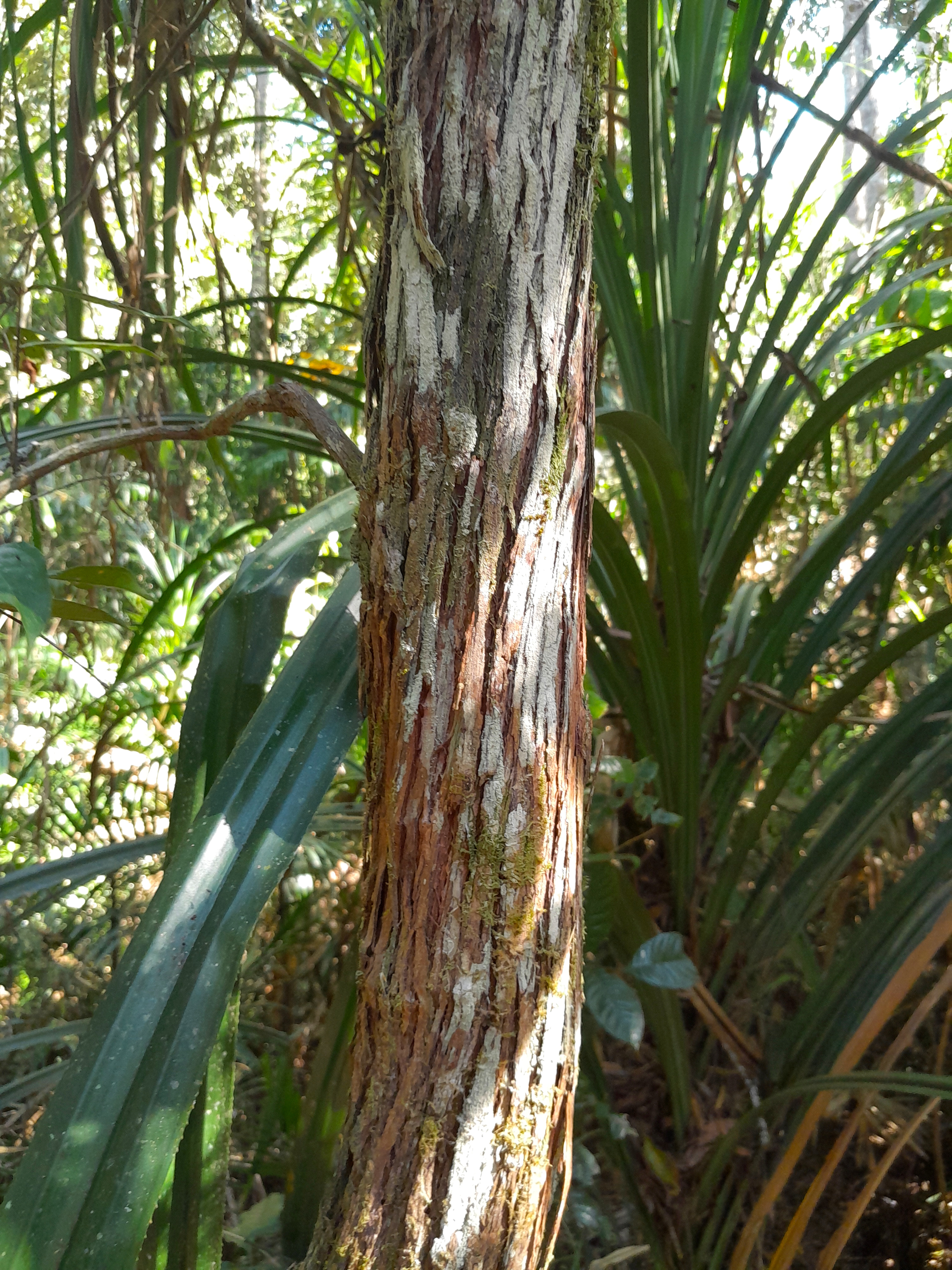
Trunk

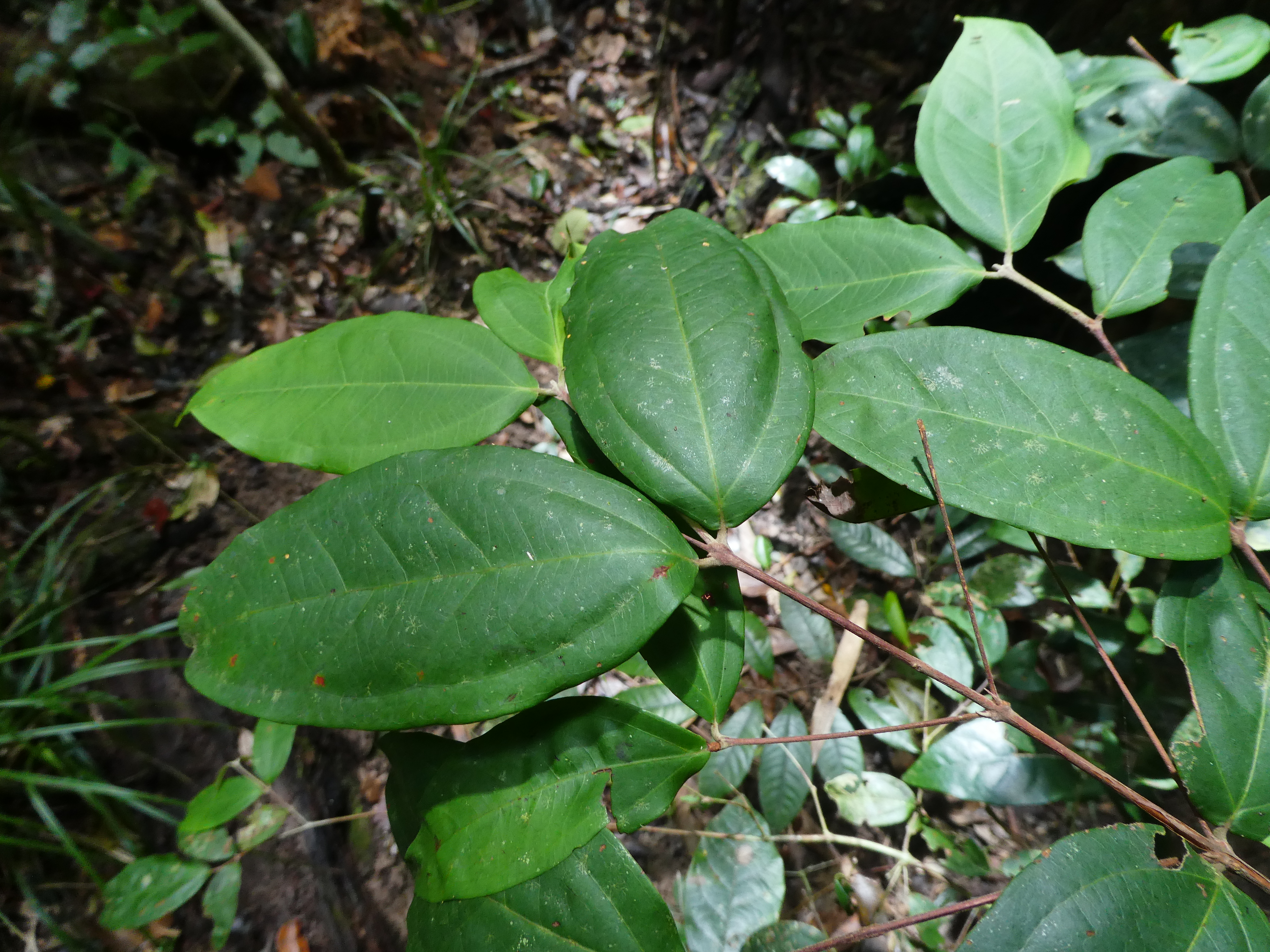
Foliage, and twigs covered in fine hairs

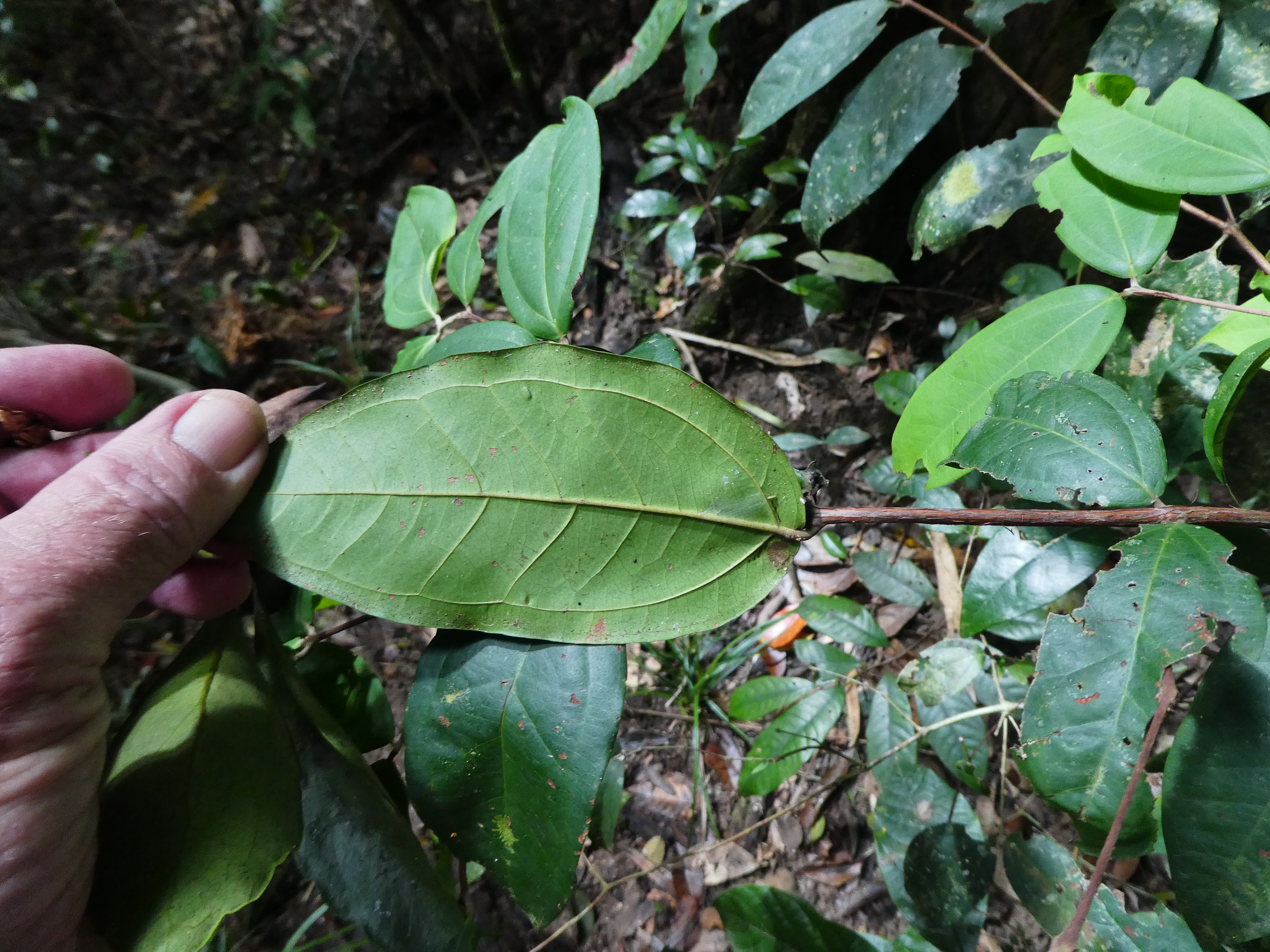
Underside of leaf, showing intramarginal veins

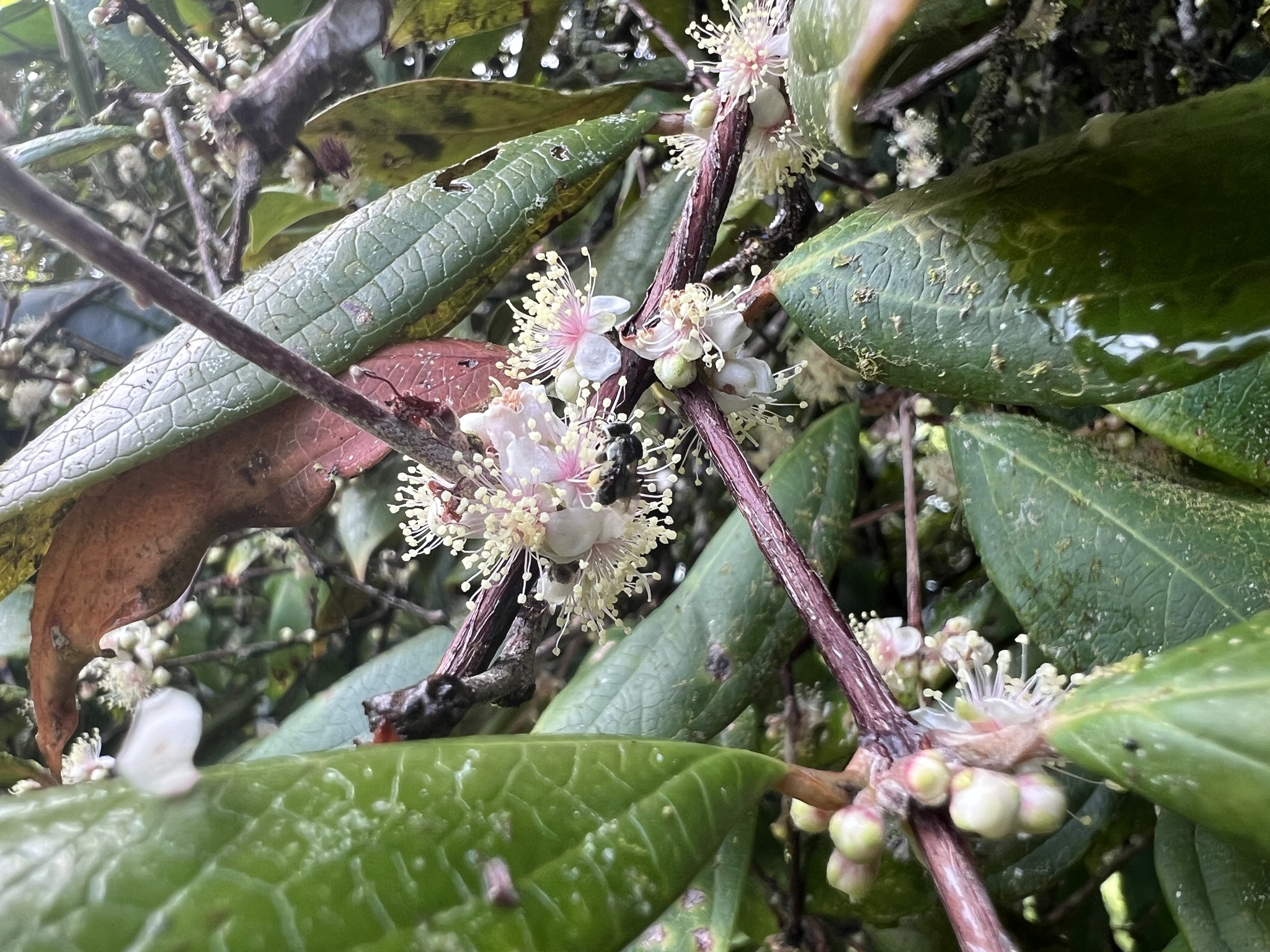
Sessile flowers

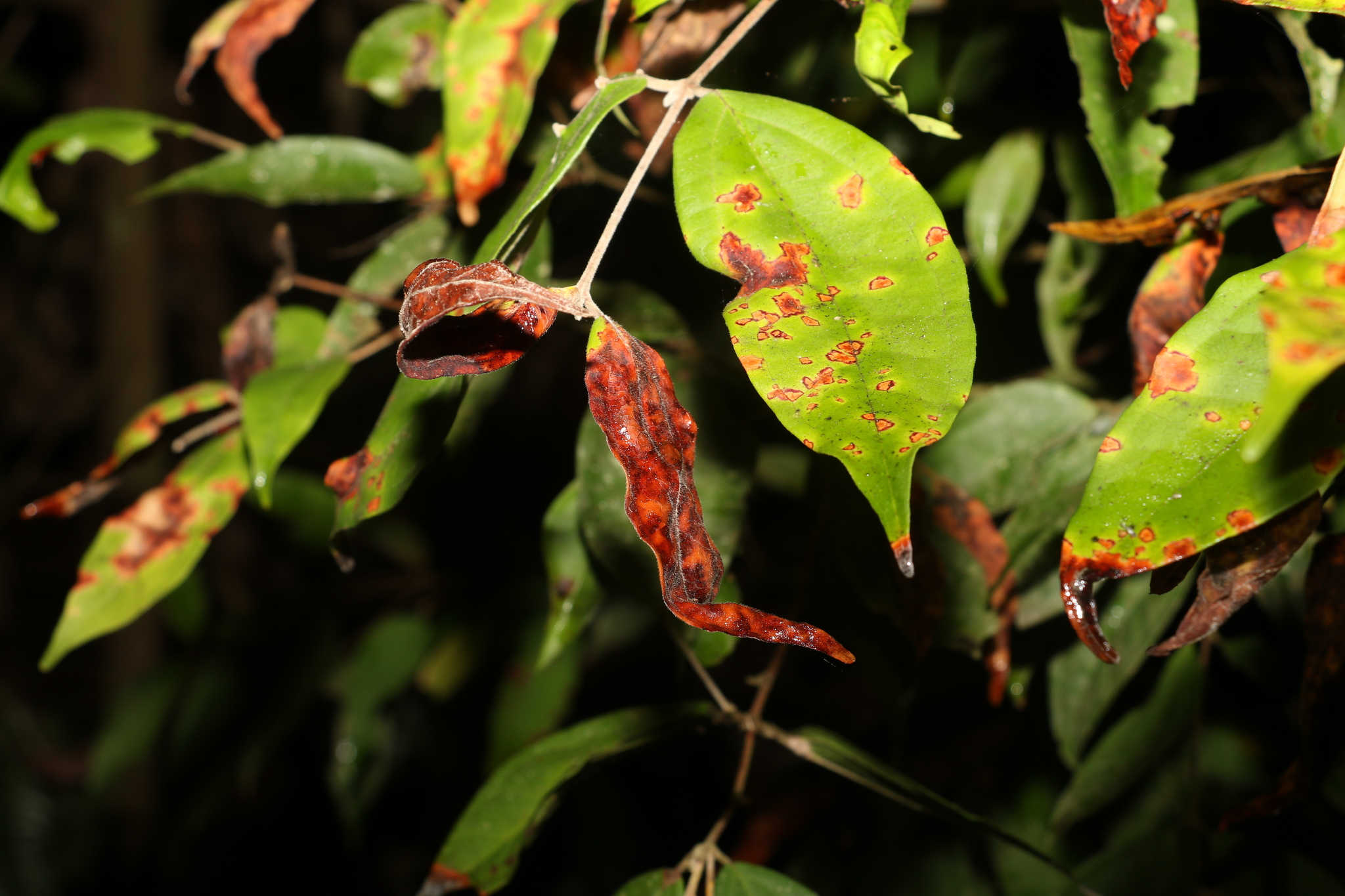
Leaves with myrtle rust damage
