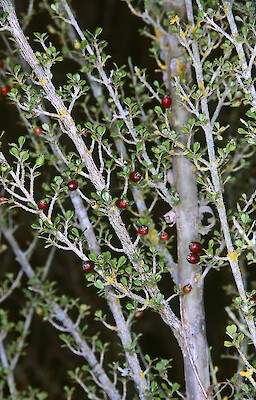

Conservation status
- Vulnerable (IUCN 3.1)

Scientific classification
- Kingdom: Plantae
- Clade: Tracheophytes
- Clade: Angiosperms
- Clade: Eudicots
- Clade: Rosids
- Order: Myrtales
- Family: Myrtaceae
- Genus: Lophomyrtus
- Species: L. obcordata

Binomial name
- Lophomyrtus obcordata (Raoul) Burret

Synonyms
- Eugenia obcordata Raoul; Myrtus obcordata (Raoul) Hook.f.

= Lophomyrtus obcordata =

Species of flowering plant

Lophomyrtus obcordata, commonly known by its Māori name rōhutu or tutuhi, is a species of flowering plant in the family Myrtaceae. It is a shrub or tree endemic to New Zealand, usually found in lowland forest. Lophomyrtus comes from the ancient Greek lóphos (crest), meaning bunches; and Myrtus (myrtle) meaning myrtle tree. Obcordata is associated with a heart-shaped leaf, attached to the peduncle by the pointed end.

== Description ==
=== Vegetative ===
Lophomyrtus obcordata is a flowering plant from the myrtle family, Myrtaceae. It is a tall bushy shrub whose size can reach up to c. 5–6 m (16–20 ft). This shrub has a smooth trunk beige hidden by pieces of greyish bark whose diameter is about 0.2 m (7.9 in). The branches are spread out; the branchlets are numerous, erect, of the subcylindrical type, and slightly pubescent.

The leaves are much smaller than those of other trees of the same genus (e.g. Lophomyrtus bullata). These leaves are thick, heart-shaped, opposite or fasciculate, glabrous when adult (and pubescent before), and 5 to 10 mm long and wide. They are carried by petioles 1 mm long, rather fragile and brittle.

=== Plant reproductive system ===
The flowers are axillary and solitary, 6 to 8 mm in diameter, borne by fine pubescent pedicels about 20 mm long. It has four sepals, four white petals, and a large number of stamens (about 100 or more). The ovary is inferior, meaning that it is surrounded by the receptacle and has two or three compartments and therefore two or three placentas (axile placentation) where there are a large number of ovules.

The fruits are oval berries of bright red to dark red color, and their size is 6 mm long. The seeds are brown, bean-shaped, with a resistant, glabrous, and rather smooth seed coat. They are produced in very large numbers.

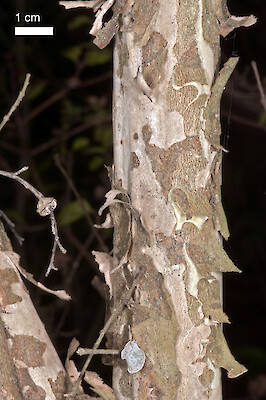
Trunk

== Geographic distribution and habitat ==
=== Natural global range ===
Lophomyrtus obcordata is a species endemic to New Zealand. Lophomyrtus was formerly placed in the genus Myrtus, a genus found mainly in South America. The genus Lophomyrtus is endemic to New Zealand.

=== New Zealand range ===
Lophomyrtus obcordata is an endemic species of New Zealand. It can be found on both, the North and South Islands, although it is found mainly on the South Island.

It grows well in coastal forests and rather at low altitudes. For example, it can be found in the forest of Westland, where the rich and deep soils and the heat are conducive to its development, although this species is also rather tolerant to drought.

=== Habitat preferences ===
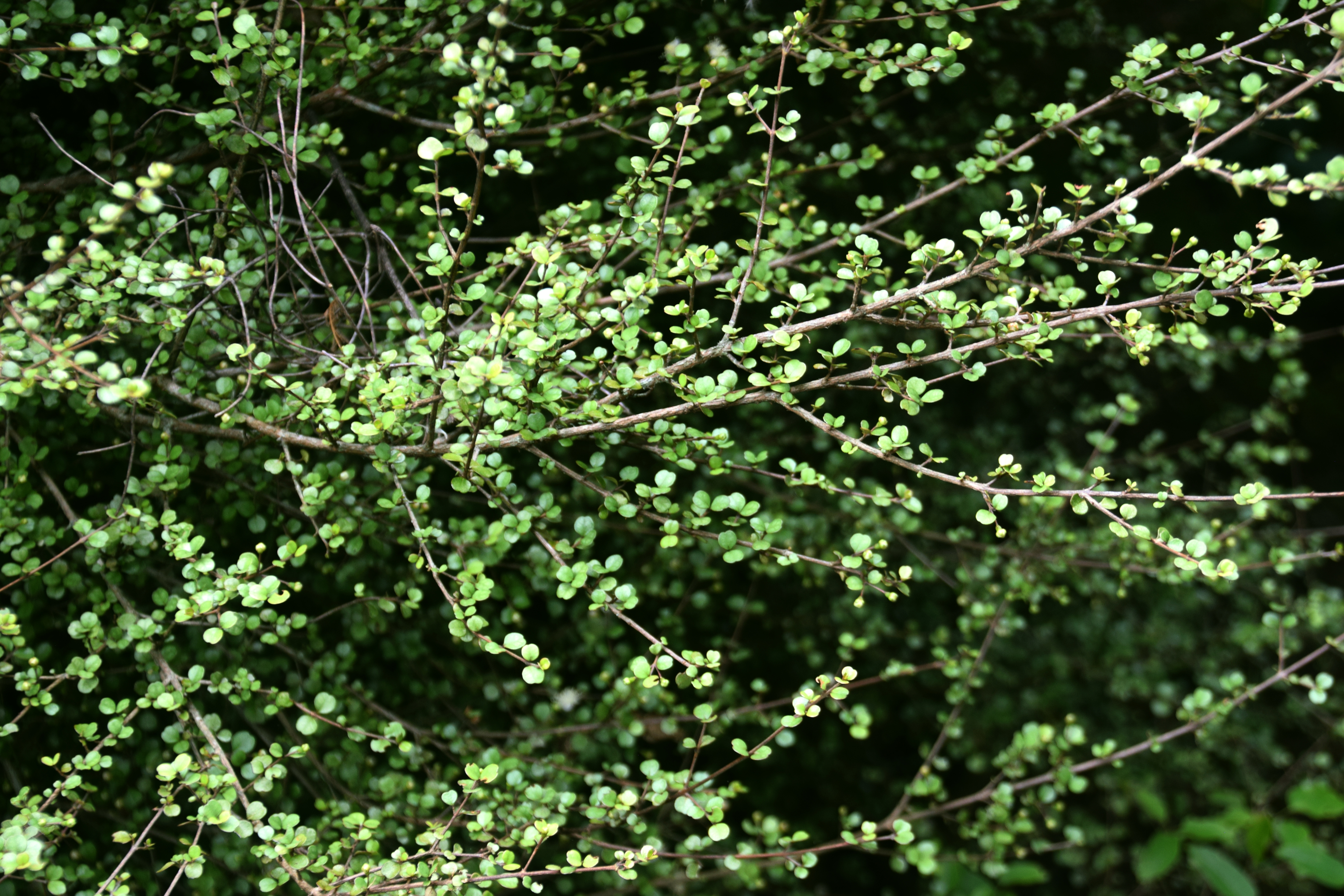
Branches

Lophomyrtus obcordata is mostly found in coastal forests, but also in the montane forests, although more often present in coastal and lowland habitats. Occasionally, it can be found in the alluvial forests of the eastern South Island.

This shrub is found in the forest understory and in rock-like habitats.

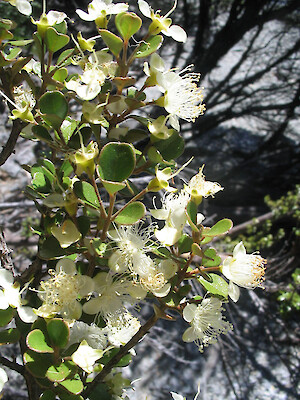
Flowers

== Life cycle, phenology ==
The data concerning the flowering and dispersal period vary, according to the region concerned. Flowering takes place from December to March, or after depending on the climate. For example, in the Banks Peninsula, the flowering seems to be earlier, from December to January. Fruiting takes place from January to May.

There is no information known regarding germination. The lack of information on the phenology of Lophomyrtus obcordata makes the conservation of this species difficult.

For information, Lophomyrtus obcordata is diploid with 22 pairs of chromosomes.

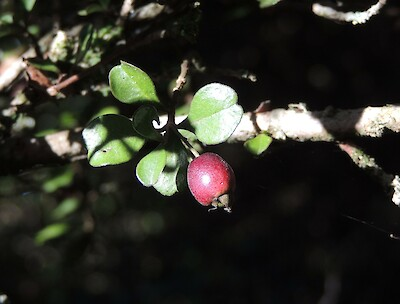
Fruits

== Ecology ==
=== Soil ===
Lophomyrtus obcordata grows in rich and deep soils, loamy, and possibly clay soils. Loamy soils are very rich and fertile soils, conducive to the good development of plants. These soils are rather light and heat up quickly during sunshine. However, these soils become depleted over time, which can harm the development of Lophomyrtus obcordata.

It prefers moist soils. It adapts quite easily to any type of pH, but its development will be limited in acid soils.

== Threats ==
=== Predators ===
Lophomyrtus obcordata has foliage and fruit that are very attractive to birds, insects, and pollinators such as bees. These species may be endemic to New Zealand, or adventive.

Landcare Research-Manaaki Whenua gives a list of 14 species that are in association with Lophomyrtus obcordata. They can be classified according to their order. For example, Lepidoptera and Hemiptera feed on the leaves and can therefore be problematic for shrubs.

=== Parasites and diseases ===
There are no known parasites specific to Lophomyrtus obcordata. However, some parasites generally attack plants of the Myrtaceae family.

One of the biggest threats to this family is Austropuccinia psidii, the cause of myrtle rust disease. The rust spreads very quickly and destroys endemic species of the Myrtaceae family, particularly Lophomyrtus obcordata, but also another close species, Lophomyrtus bullata (ramarama). Unfortunately, even today the control of this disease is still inefficient, due to a lack of knowledge.

==== Myrtle rust ====
Myrtle rust is a fungal disease that can affect the plant of the Myrtaceae family. This disease forms bright yellow spots, like pimples. These are spores that spread from one plant to another. It quickly spreads over the entire surface of the leaf, starting from the underside. The oldest spores are brown and gray. If the disease spreads too much, the leaves may curl up, and necroses may appear.

== Cultural uses ==
The bark was apparently used for small carvings. From the bark and berries, it is possible to make essential oils, for example against menstrual pain.

Today, this shrub can be used for landscaping, as a hedge. myrtle rust is spreading due to global warming.

== Conservation ==
Lophomyrtus obcordata was officially listed as "threatened" and "nationally critical" in New Zealand in 2018, because of its susceptibility to myrtle rust. To give an example of what has been done to preserve this species, 89 individuals were planted on Otamahua and Quail Island between 1998 and 2010, an area where myrtle rust is currently absent.

Because of the potential disappearance of Lophomyrtus obcordata, and the threat posed by the propagation of the myrtle rust disease, it is urgent to develop conservation projects. A study has been carried out on the possibility of ex-situ conservation, which can be used in complement to in-situ conservation. This can be whole-plant or conservation of seed, pollen and germplasm. It is better to use the seeds because they are easier to use. The creation of a seed bank makes it possible to preserve an intra-population genetic variability essential to the maintenance of a species.

According to the study of Karin Van der Walt and Jayanthi Nadarajan, the species must be desiccation and cold-tolerant. The structure and the composition of the seeds were also studied. The study showed good desiccation tolerance and fairly good seed viability. These conclusions seem positive for the future.
