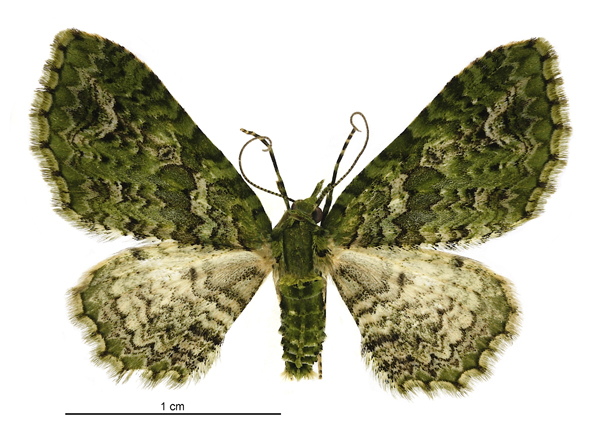
- Female
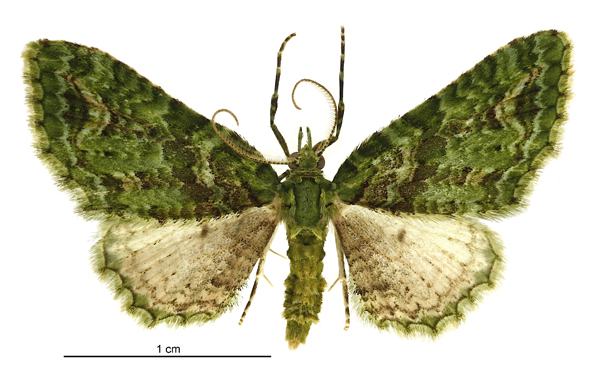
- Male

Scientific classification
- Kingdom: Animalia
- Phylum: Arthropoda
- Clade: Pancrustacea
- Class: Insecta
- Order: Lepidoptera
- Family: Geometridae
- Genus: Pasiphila
- Species: P. muscosata

Binomial name
- Pasiphila muscosata (Walker, 1862)

Synonyms
- Eupithecia muscosata Walker, 1862; Eupithecia cidariaria Guenée, 1868; Cidaria aquosata Felder & Rogenhofer, 1875; Chloroclystis muscosata (Walker, 1862)

= Pasiphila muscosata =

Species of moth endemic to New Zealand

Pasiphila muscosata, the emerald pug moth, is a moth in the family Geometridae. It is endemic to New Zealand and has been found in the North, South and Stewart Islands. The larvae of this species are known to be present in January and live on Muehlenbeckia species including Muehlenbeckia australis. The larvae tends to be brown but it is variable in both colour and markings. The larvae of this species pupates in a loose cocoon on the ground and adult moths emerge in September. Adults are commonly on the wing until the following May. Although adults tend to be a deep emerald green colour this species is again variable and there is also an orange-yellow variety as well as intermediate forms. Adults are attracted to light and often rest during the day on tree trunks.

== Taxonomy ==
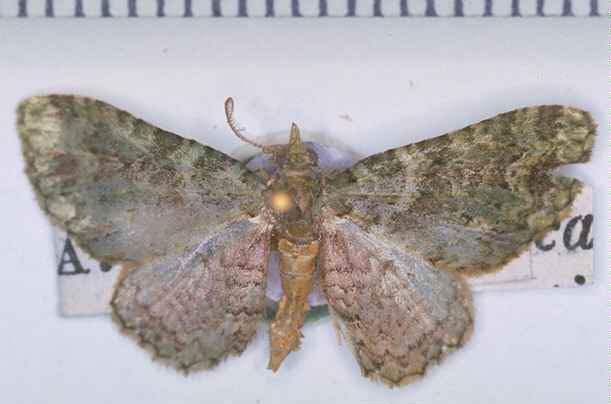
Male holotype specimen

This species was first described by Francis Walker in 1862 and named Eupithecia muscosata. Walker used a specimen collected by T. R. Oxley in Nelson. In 1868 Achille Guenée, thinking he was describing a new species, named this species Eupithecia cidariaria. In 1875 Cajetan von Felder and Alois Friedrich Rogenhofer, also thinking they were describing a new species, named this moth Cidaria aquossata. In 1888 Edward Meyrick placed this species in the genus Pasiphila and synonymised the names Eupithecia cidariaria and Cidaria aquosata. In 1898 George Hudson discussed this species as a synonym of Chloroclystis bilineolata. In 1928 Hudson again discussed as well as illustrated this species under the name Chloroclystis muscosata. In 1971 John S. Dugdale placed this species again in the genus Pasiphila. In 1988 John S. Dugdale discussed this species under the name Pasiphila muscosata and in 2010 Robert Hoare in the New Zealand Inventory of Biodiversity followed this placement. The male holotype specimen is held at the Natural History Museum, London.

== Description ==
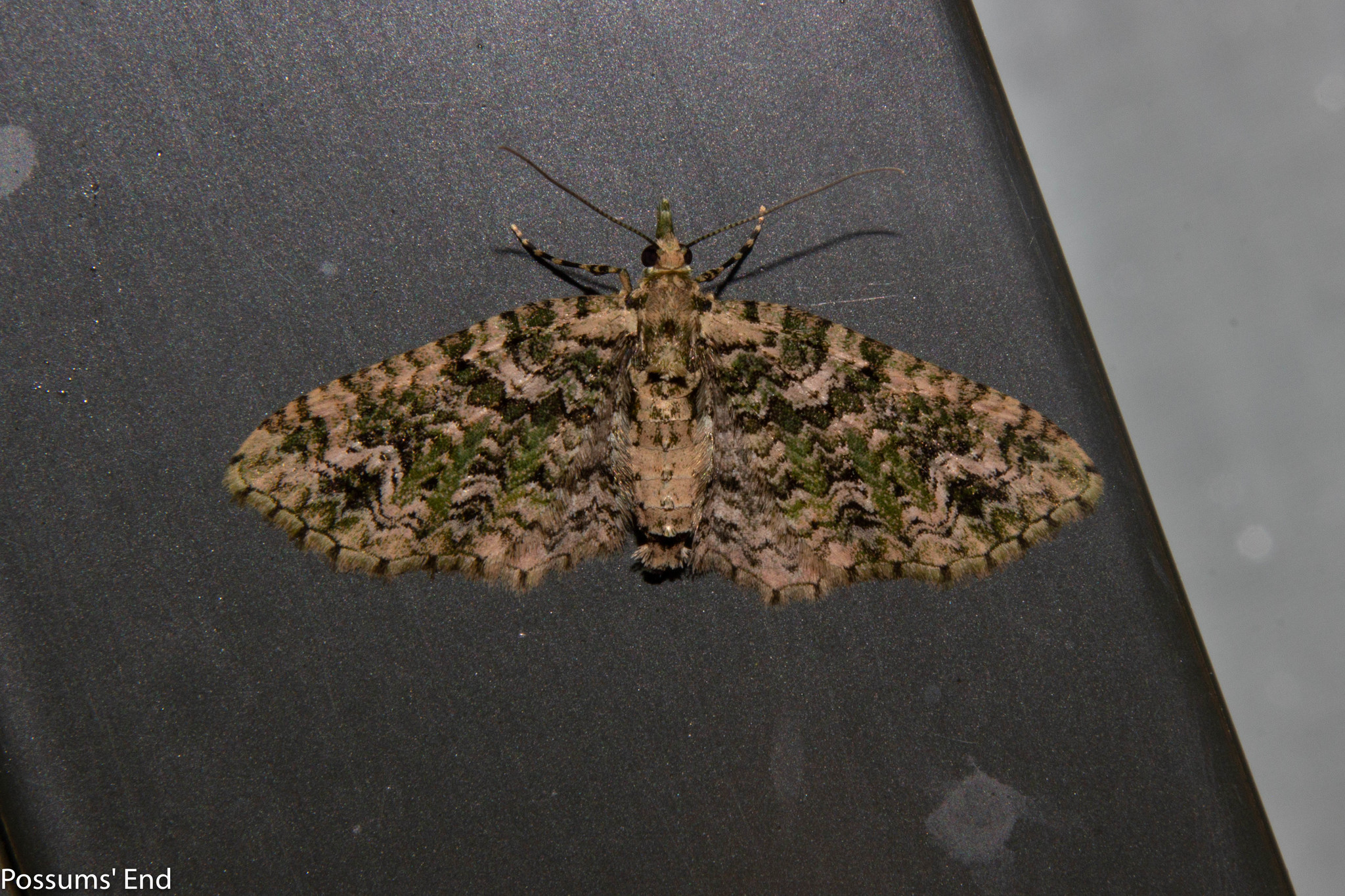
Variety of P. muscosata

Walker originally described the adult male of this species as follows:

Male. Grass-green. Palpi porrect, shorter than the breadth of the head. Antennae slightly pectinated. Wings rather broad, with several denticulated blackish lines, which are most distinct and regular in the hind wings and are most conspicuous on the veins; submarginal line pale cinereous, zigzag; marginal line black, slender; fringe with black points. Fore wings hardly acute, with two indistinct paler bands, which are remote from each other; a black cloud between the second band and the submarginal line; exterior border convex, moderately oblique. Hind wings reddish cinereous. Length of the body 4 lines; of the wings 12 lines.

This species is variable in appearance with Hudson describing a variety of this moth which has a ground colour of orange-yellow. He also stated that intermediate forms could be found but that these were much rarer than the more typical green form or the orange-yellow variety.

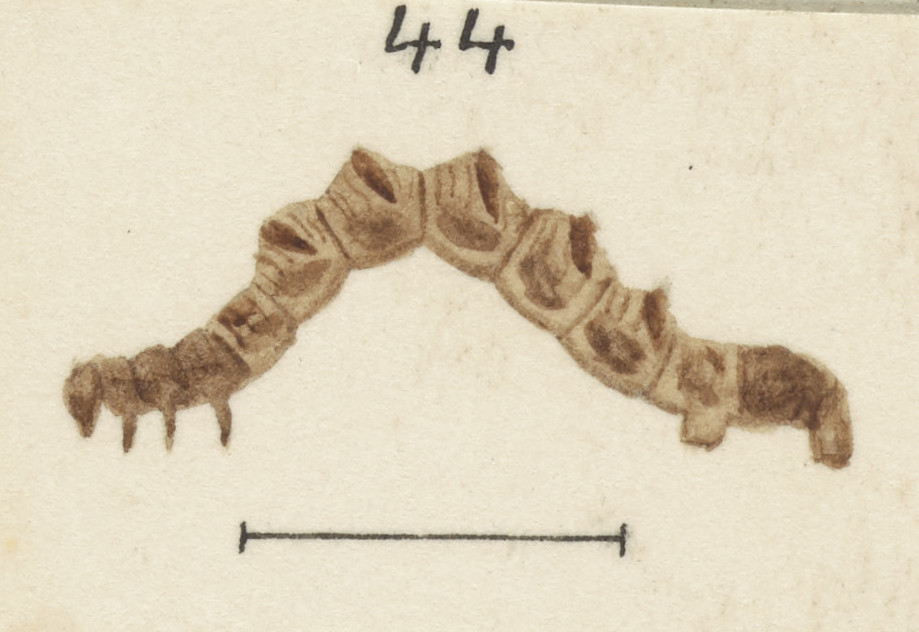
P. muscosata larva.

Hudson described the larva of this species as follows:

about 3/8 inch in length, considerably attenuated towards the head, with the segments strongly indented and the surface much wrinkled; its general colour is brown, or purplish-brown, with rich dark brown markings; there are humps on segments 6, 7, 8, 9 and 10, the largest on segment 8, each being much accentuated by a dark brown border; both extremities of the larvae are clouded with dark brown, and there is a series of dark brown, or dark greenish-brown diagonal stripes.

The larvae of this species, similar to the adults, is also variable in colour and markings. Hudson hypothesised that the appearance of the larvae imitates the dried flowers of its host plants.

== Distribution ==
This species is endemic to New Zealand and can be found in the North, South and Stewart Islands.

== Life cycle and behaviour ==
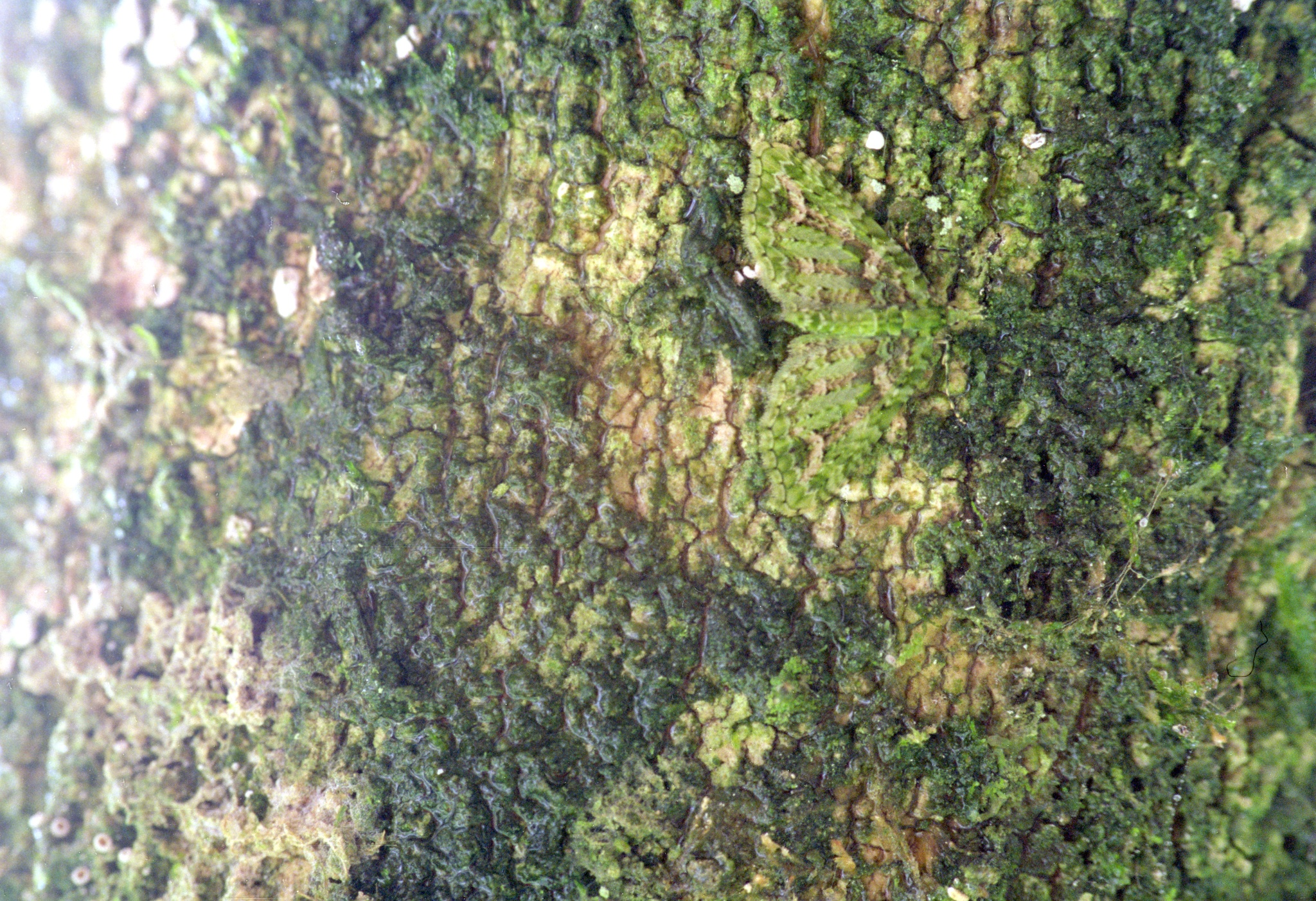
Camouflaged Pasiphila muscosata.

From late December to mid January adults lay their oval, flattened eggs, usually singly, on the leaves of their host species. These eggs hatch after about fifteen days. They turn a dark colour in the last few days of maturing. The larvae of this species tend to be present in January. They are known to rest with their body held in a twisted shape and when walking have been observed to sway from side to side. This species pupates in a loose cocoon on the ground. There appears to be only one brood per year for this species. The adults of this species are on the wing all year round but more commonly from September until May. They are attracted to light and have been collected via a mercury vapour light trap. They have been observed resting during the day on tree trunks where their appearance resembles moss making the species extremely difficult to find.

== Habitat and hosts ==
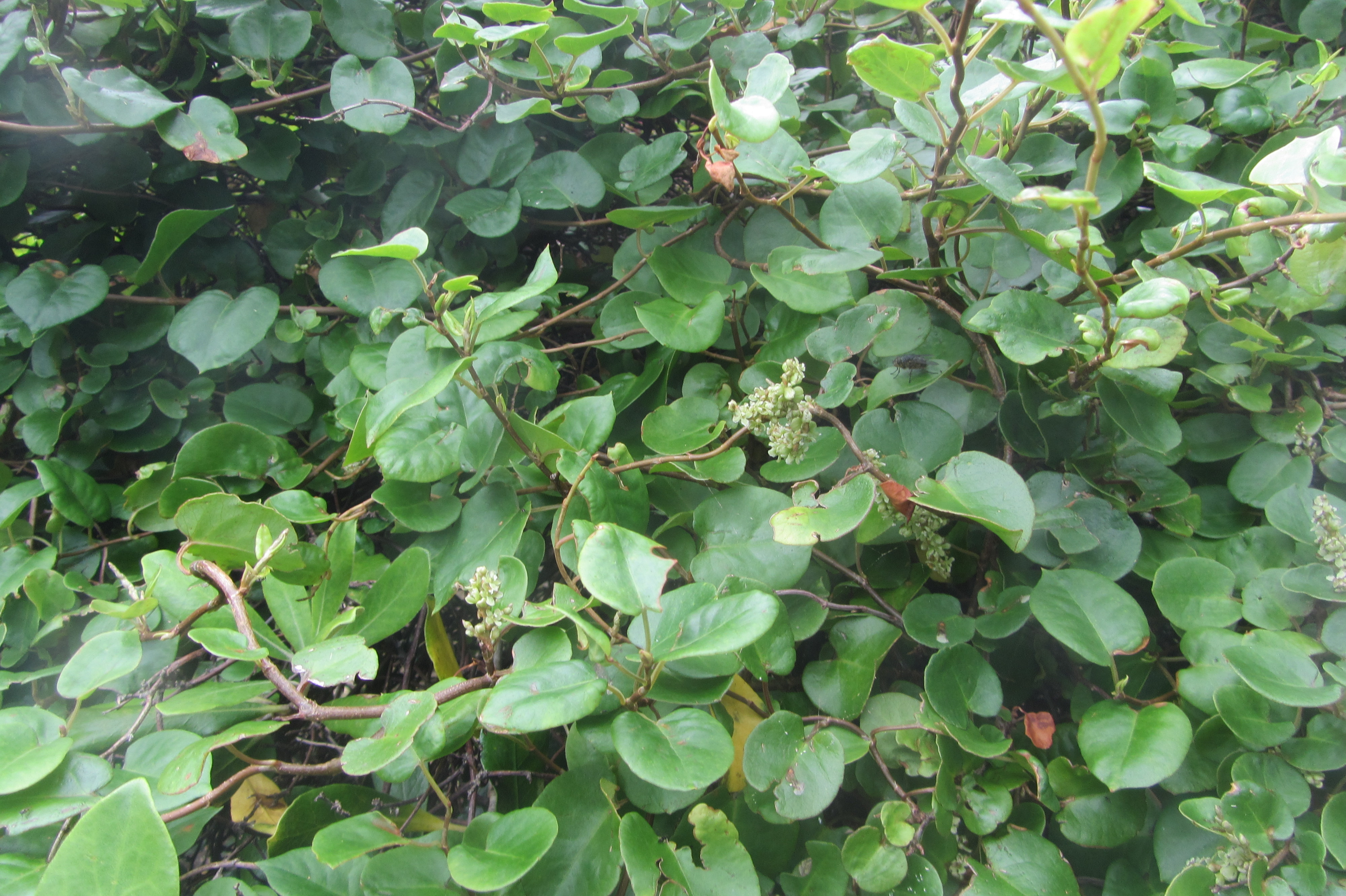
Larval host Muehlenbeckia australis

Larvae of this species live on species in the genus Muehlenbeckia as well as on Lophomyrtus bullata. They have been successfully reared in captivity on Muehlenbeckia australis.
