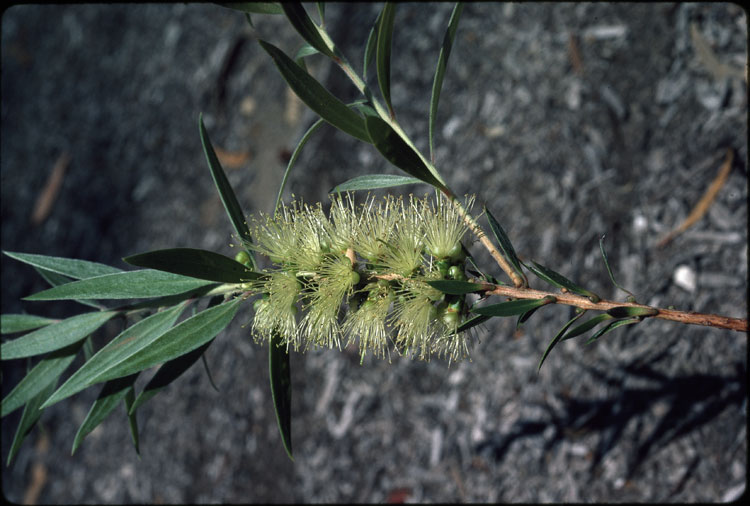

Scientific classification
- Kingdom: Plantae
- Clade: Embryophytes
- Clade: Tracheophytes
- Clade: Spermatophytes
- Clade: Angiosperms
- Clade: Eudicots
- Clade: Rosids
- Order: Myrtales
- Family: Myrtaceae
- Genus: Melaleuca
- Species: M. formosa

Binomial name
- Melaleuca formosa (S.T.Blake) Craven

Synonyms
- Callistemon formosus S.T.Blake

= Melaleuca formosa =

Kingaroy bottlebrush

Species of flowering plant

Melaleuca formosa, commonly known as Kingaroy bottlebrush or cliff bottlebrush is a plant in the myrtle family, Myrtaceae and is endemic to a small area in Queensland and peripherally in New South Wales, Australia. (Some Australian state herbaria continue to use the name Callistemon formosus). It is a shrub with weeping branches and spikes of lemon-coloured flowers in spring.

== Description ==
Melaleuca formosa is a spreading shrub growing to 2–6 m (7–20 ft) tall. Its leaves are arranged alternately and are 35–86 mm (1–3 in) long, 3–9 mm (0.1–0.4 in) wide, flat, narrow egg-shaped or narrow elliptical with a mid-vein and have distinct oil glands and 11 to 24 branching veins.

The flowers are whitish through cream to lime-green and arranged in spikes on the ends of branches that continue to grow after flowering as well as on the sides of the branches. The spikes are up to 45 mm (2 in) in diameter with 20 to 40 individual flowers. The petals are 3.5–4.5 mm (0.14–0.18 in) long and fall off as the flower ages. There are 57 to 63 stamens in each flower, tipped with yellow. Flowering occurs throughout the year but mainly in spring and is followed by fruit that are woody capsules, 3.8–5.4 mm (0.1–0.2 in) long.

== Taxonomy and naming ==
This species was first formally described in 1958 as Callistemon formosus by S.T.Blake in Proceedings of the Royal Society of Queensland based on a specimen found "near Kingaroy (near Edenvale Rwy. Stn.), low plateau, remnant of mixed low forest on red loam." The specific epithet (formosa) is a Latin word meaning “beautiful” or "handsome", referring to the appearance of the plant.

In 2006 Lyndley Craven sank Callistemon into Melaleuca giving the new combination Melaleuca formosa for this species. However, this change is controversial and is not accepted by the Australian Plant Census or the National Herbarium of New South Wales. Callistemon formosus is regarded as a synonym of Melaleuca formosa by the Queensland Herbarium and by Plants of the World Online.

== Distribution and habitat ==
This melaleuca occurs in near coastal districts in south eastern Queensland, where it grows in vine forest or as an understorey plant beneath eucalypts in loam or sandy soil over trachyte.

== Conservation status ==
Melaleuca formosa is classified as near threatened under the Government of Queensland Nature Conservation Act (1992).

== Use in horticulture ==
Melaleuca formosa is grown as a street tree in Kingaroy. It is recommended as a shrub to be grown under powerlines and has been found to be relatively tolerant to the fungal disease, myrtle rust (Uredo rangelii).
