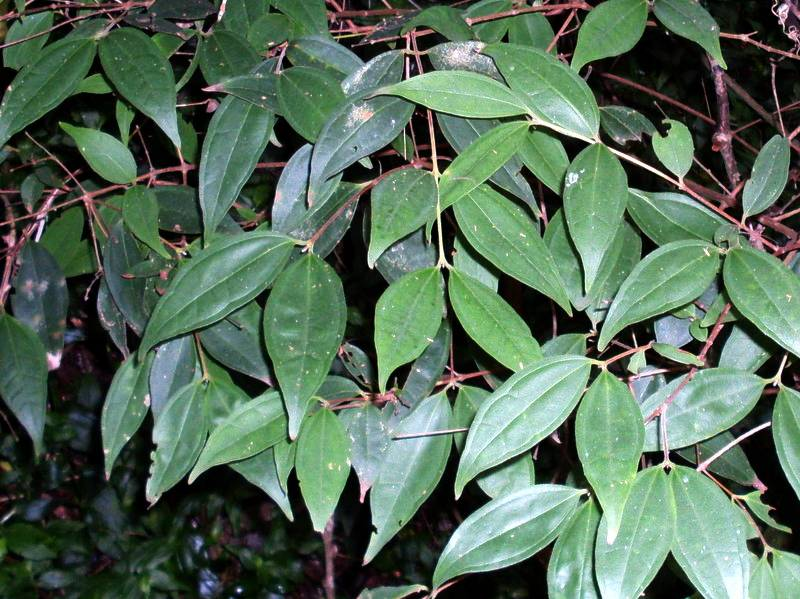
- Rhodamnia rubescens at Elvina Bay, Australia.

Conservation status
- Critically endangered (EPBC Act)

Scientific classification
- Kingdom: Plantae
- Clade: Tracheophytes
- Clade: Angiosperms
- Clade: Eudicots
- Clade: Rosids
- Order: Myrtales
- Family: Myrtaceae
- Genus: Rhodamnia
- Species: R. rubescens

Binomial name
- Rhodamnia rubescens (Benth.) Miq.

Synonyms
- Myrtus trinervia Sm.; Eugenia? trinervia DC.; Monoxora rubescens Benth.; Myrtus melastomoides F.Muell.; Rhodamnia trinervia Blume

= Rhodamnia rubescens =

Species of tree

Rhodamnia rubescens, the scrub stringybark, brush turpentine, or brown malletwood, is an evergreen rainforest tree of the myrtle family Myrtaceae, that is native to Eastern Australia. Identified by a stringy type of bark and triple-veined leaves, it grows in a variety of different rainforests from the Batemans Bay region (35° S) of southeastern New South Wales to Gympie (27° S) in southeastern Queensland. It is not seen in the cool temperate rainforests. The pathogen myrtle rust threatens the existence of Rhodamnia rubescens.

== Description ==
This small to medium tree can attain a height of up to 25 metres (82 ft) and a trunk diameter of 75 centimetres (30 in). The bark is reddish brown, brittle, scaly and "stringy", similar to its relative, Syncarpia glomulifera (the turpentine tree). Its base is channelled, fluted or somewhat buttressed.

The opposite leaves are simple, not toothed, pointed, elliptical in shape, and around 5 to 10 centimetres (2.0 to 3.9 in) long. They are clearly triple-veined, with one central vein and two curved veins closely following the outline of the leaf. The net venation is visible on both sides. The leaves are downy underneath and have a greyish colour. The oil dots are transparent and visible with a hand lens. The tree's small branches are scaly with the same reddish bark as the trunk; the new shoots are covered in minute hairs.

White fragrant flowers form on panicled cymes from August to October. The fruit is a small berry, initially red then turning to shiny black as it matures from October to December. The berries can measure up to 6 millimetres (0.24 in) in diameter. The fruit is eaten by various birds, including the brown cuckoo dove, figbird, green catbird and rainbow lorikeet. Removing the seed from the fleshy aril is advised to assist germination. Regeneration with cuttings is possible.

== Conservation Status ==
Rhodamnia rubescens is listed as "critically endangered under the Australian Environment Protection and Biodiversity Conservation Act 1999, Queensland Nature Conservation Act 1992, and the New South Wales Biodiversity Conservation Act 2016.
