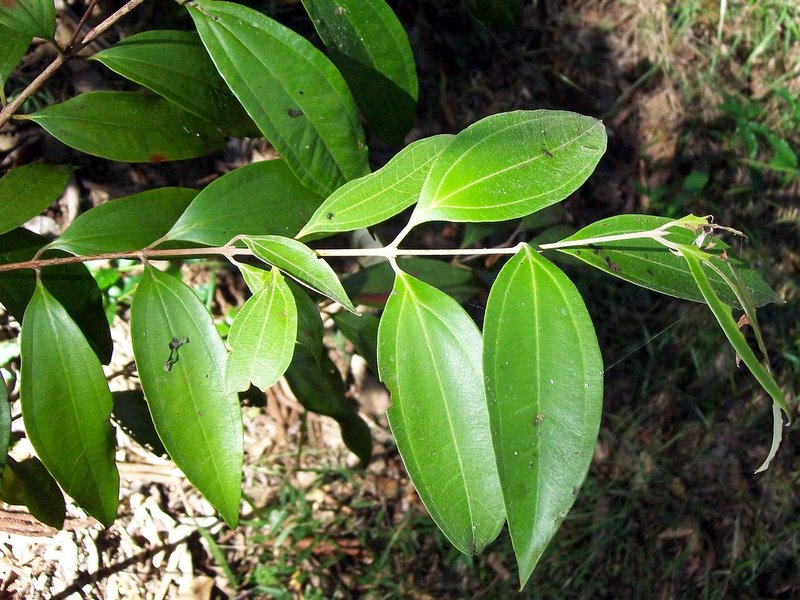
- Rhodamnia argentea juvenile leaves

Scientific classification
- Kingdom: Plantae
- Clade: Tracheophytes
- Clade: Angiosperms
- Clade: Eudicots
- Clade: Rosids
- Order: Myrtales
- Family: Myrtaceae
- Genus: Rhodamnia
- Species: R. argentea

Binomial name
- Rhodamnia argentea Benth.

= Rhodamnia argentea =

Malletwood

Species of tree

Rhodamnia argentea is a rainforest tree of eastern Australia. Commonly known as malletwood, white myrtle, silver leaf, silver malletwood and white turpentine. The natural habitat is a variety of different rain forests, at sea level or in the adjacent ranges. It grows on sand, alluvium and volcanic based soils. It can be found from the Hastings River, New South Wales to Bowen, Queensland.

== Description ==
A mid-sized tree up to 30 metres in height and a stem diameter of 85 centimetres. The trunk can be straight and tall, somewhat fluted or buttressed at the base. Papery brown or grey bark, with vertical cracks and fissures are present on larger trees. Small branches are brown, though at the end they become white or silvery, as do new shoots.

The leaves can be ovate, lanceolate, elliptic or oval in shape, 4 to 13 cm long, 2.5 to 6 cm wide. Oil dots are either rarely visible or not visible at all. The leaves are three veined in appearance and silvery white underneath. The leaf base is triangular in shape.

=== Flowers and fruit ===
White flowers form in cymes appearing from leaf axils in November and December. The cyme is on a stalk up to 13 mm long, and usually produces three small flowers. The fruit is a round blackberry, 10 mm in diameter. Inside are one or more yellow seeds. Fruit matures from March to June.

The fruit is eaten by various birds, including the green catbird, Lewin's honeyeater and regent bowerbird. Removing the seed from the fleshy aril is advised to assist germination. Germination from the seed is slow, and cutting it has proved to be unreliable.
