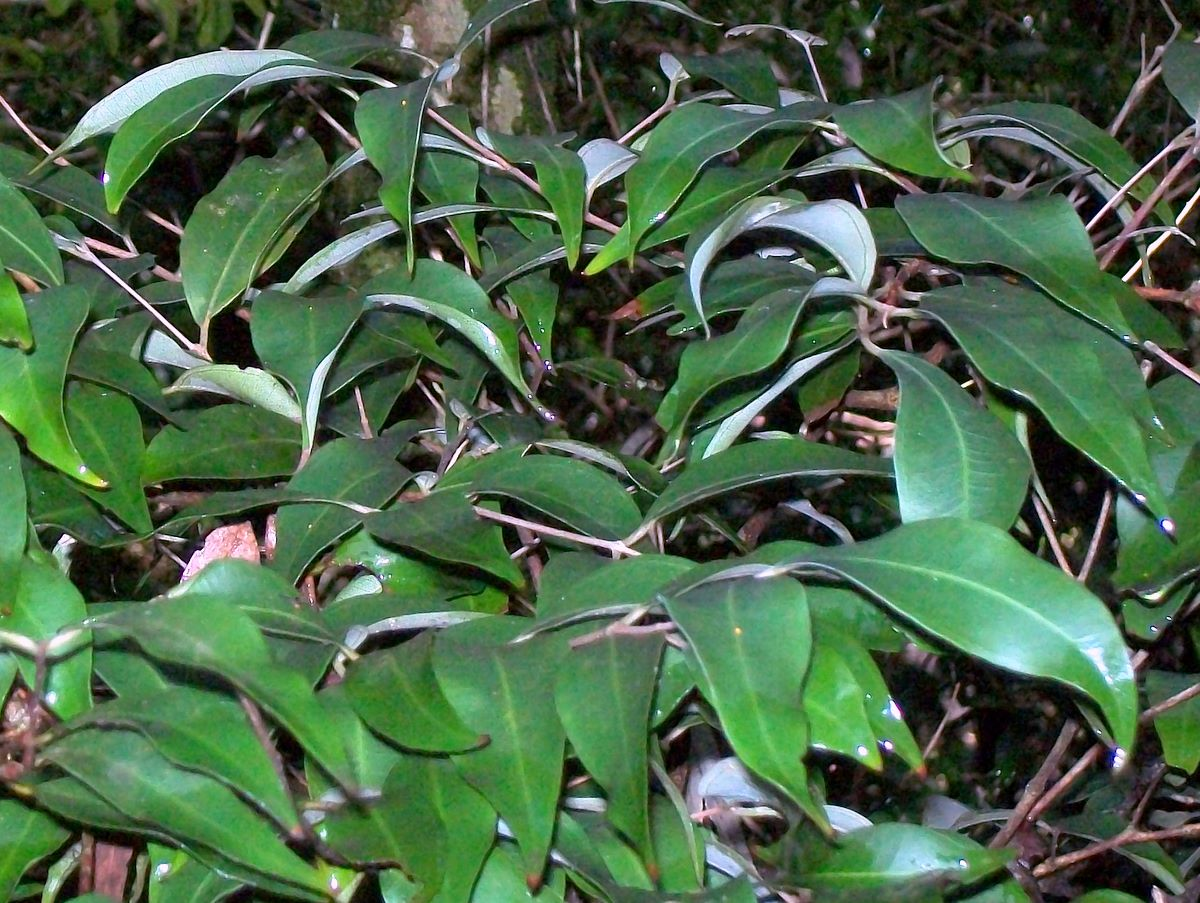

Conservation status
- Critically Endangered (NCA)

Scientific classification
- Kingdom: Plantae
- Clade: Tracheophytes
- Clade: Angiosperms
- Clade: Eudicots
- Clade: Rosids
- Order: Myrtales
- Family: Myrtaceae
- Genus: Rhodamnia
- Species: R. whiteana

Binomial name
- Rhodamnia whiteana Guymer & Jessup

Synonyms
- Rhodamnia costata A.J.Scott

= Rhodamnia whiteana =

Species of plant

Rhodamnia whiteana, known as the cliff malletwood or White's malletwood , is a sub-tropical rainforest plant of eastern Australia. It was first formally described in 1986 by Gordon Guymer and Laurence Jessup from a specimen collected from Mount Cordeaux.

It is named in honour of the botanist C.T.White. The generic name Rhodamnia is derived from the Greek Rhodon which means "rose", and aminon, "bowl" where the blood of lambs was poured after sacrifice. It refers to the bowl shaped calyx tubes.

Cliff malletwood occurs on the edge of sub tropical rainforest or dry rainforest. It is often associated with hoop pine, on shallow basalt soil in high rainfall areas, particularly on the border of New South Wales and Queensland.

A small to mid-sized tree with a dense canopy, up to 20 metres high and a stem diameter of 35 cm, it is often multi-stemmed, with up to 12 stems from the same root base.

Leaves are 5 to 9.5 cm long, 1.5 to 3 cm wide, dark green above, pale or whitish below. The leaf stalk is grooved, 5 to 10 mm long. Oil dots may clearly be seen under a lens. The bark is soft, papery and fissured, grey brown in colour. Small white flowers appear in December to January. The fruit is a berry, starting green, then turning yellow, orange, red, then black; around 10 mm in diameter. The fruit contains six to ten seeds.

== Conservation status ==
Rhodamnia whiteana is listed as "endangered" under the Queensland Nature Conservation Act 1992. It is not listed under the Australian Environment Protection and Biodiversity Conservation Act 1999.
