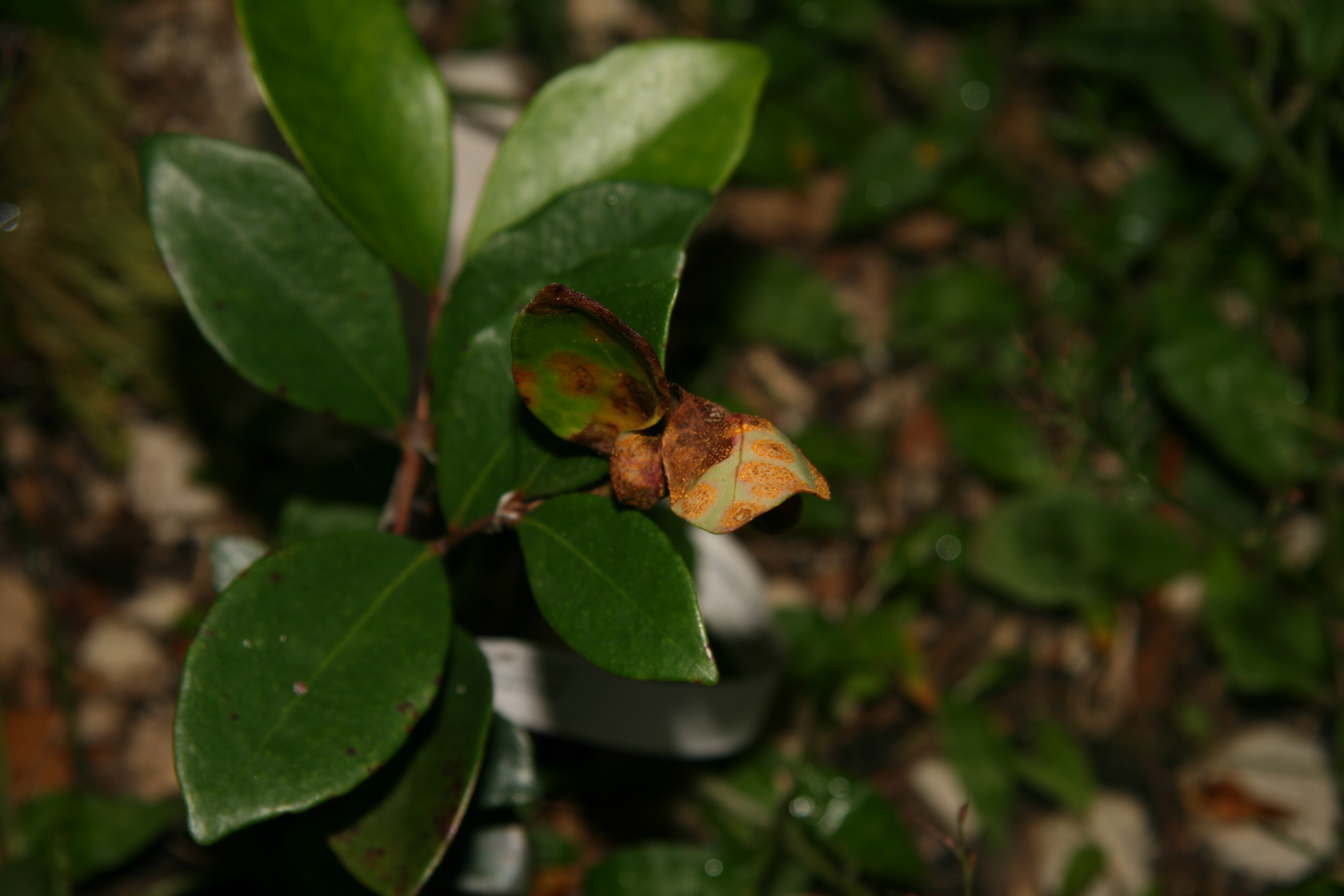
- On Eugenia reinwardtiana

Scientific classification
- Kingdom: Fungi
- Division: Basidiomycota
- Class: Pucciniomycetes
- Order: Pucciniales
- Family: Sphaerophragmiaceae
- Genus: Austropuccinia (G.Winter) Beenken
- Species: A. psidii

Binomial name
- Austropuccinia psidii (G. Winter) Beenken (2017)

Synonyms
- Species synonymy: Puccinia psidii G. Winter (1884); Uredo rangelii J.A. Simpson, K. Thomas & Grgur. (2006)

= Austropuccinia =

Genus of fungi

Austropuccinia is a monotypic genus of rust (a type of plant pathogen) native to South America with the only species Austropuccinia psidii, commonly known as myrtle rust, guava rust, or ʻōhiʻa rust. It affects plants in the family Myrtaceae. It is a member of the fungal complex called the guava rust (Puccinia psidii) group. The spores have a distinctive yellow to orange colour, occasionally encircled by a purple ring. They are found on lesions on new growth including shoots, leaves, buds and fruits. Leaves become twisted and may die. Infections in highly susceptible species may result in the death of the host plant.

As of late 2013, it is infecting around 179 species in New South Wales and Queensland, from 41 genera (around 46% of genera in the Myrtaceae) in Australia.

== Importance ==
Austropuccinia psidii, a myrtle rust or a rust fungus, has a large host range for infection, making disease control and prevention difficult. However, it has been seen to have biological uses. In Florida, the pathogen has been considered as a biological control agent for the invasive Australian plant, Melaleuca quinquenervia. Melaleuca quinquenervia is a weed tree that has invaded south Florida. If left unchecked, it will cause of the most serious threats to the integrity of the native ecosystem, turning marshes in the Everglades into swamps. With Autropuccinia psidii, the disease has the ability to disperse inoculum rapidly and attack healthy tissues, causing substantial damage to their hosts. This creates pustules and eventually leads to the death of the invasive species.

Austropuccinia psidii can rapidly spread globally and can impact commercially and ecologically important species of Myrtaeceae such as Archirhodomyrtus beckleri, Decaspermum humile, Gossia hillii and Rhodamnia maideniana, that are extremely important in Australia affecting their native forest ecosystems and causing extinctions. Austropuccinia psidii has also been found to also be an invasive species that infects young growing tissues of plants. It infects developed leaves, floral bud, fruits and Coppice. This fungus is a serious problem because of its ability to spread rapidly from its production of a large number of small spores that can be easily dispersed over long distances by wind. These spores can also be dispersed by vectors that include animals such as birds, bats, possums, and insects that have been in contact with the rust spores. Austropuccinia psidii has a potential to cause damage to natural ecosystems. In Australia, many ecosystems are dominated by Eucalyptus which is also the dominant tree in most of Hawaii's forests. Infection from Autropuccinia psidii results in significant changes to the structure, composition, and the function of forests trees on a landscape level. Thus, it greatly impacts biodiversity of other flora and fauna in these ecosystems.

== Taxonomy ==
The fungus was first described scientifically in 1884 as Puccinia psidii by G. Winter, then described again in 2006 as Uredo rangelii by mycologists J.A. Simpson, K. Thomas, and Cheryl Grgurinovic. Finally in 2017 the names were synonymised by Beenken in a new genus as Austropuccinia psidii.

== Development and symptoms ==
Myrtle rust is typically characterised by the appearance of urediniospores on the underside of the leaf, though urediniospores may also be found on the top of the leaf or on young stems. Initially, the disease appears as small purple or red brown flecks with a faint chlorotic halo on the leaf surface, which coalesce to form bright yellow pustules. As the rust develops, these pustules often fade to a grey brown colour. A high degree of pustule coalescence can result in distortion of the leaf. Myrtle rust also makes plants more susceptible to secondary infections, which may occur within days of the initial appearance of the pustules.

Favourable conditions that increase the infection rate include: new tissue; high humidity; free water on plant surface for more than 6 hours; moderate temperatures, around 15–25 °C. Low light conditions (minimum of 8 hours) after spore contact can increase germination.

The main ways in which myrtle rust can be spread are by: the movement of infected plant material, the movement of contaminated equipment, wind, water and gravity, animals, humans and/or vehicles.

Myrtle rust may remain on a single host plant to complete its life cycle, which can be as short as 10–14 days.

== As an invasive species ==
Austropuccinia psidii can have very serious consequences to various species of plants in the Myrtaceae. This family includes guava (the original host of this rust in Brazil), eucalyptus, melaleuca, and a number of species native to Hawaii, including some endemic species (found nowhere else on Earth) and at least one important native forest tree. There are numerous strains of the Austropuccinia psidii rust—some known to be established in Florida, and at least one reported from California and there is concern that strains may exist or develop that could be devastating to ʻōhiʻa (Metrosideros polymorpha), one of Hawaii's dominant native trees, a foundation species for many remaining Hawaiian native ecosystems. However currently, the major threat of Puccinia in Hawaii is the massive damage it is doing to Eugenia koolauensis, a federally listed endangered species.

Myrtle rust was first recorded in Australia in mid-2010 and currently poses a major threat to the continent's ecosystem given that almost 80 per cent of Australian native trees are Mytraceae, most indigenous species rely on healthy trees for their survival. Additionally it poses a major threat to Australia's primary industry sector. Its current range includes much of the eastern coastal fringe of the Australian mainland.

Initial detection was in April 2010 in Gosford in the Central Coast region of New South Wales. It was initially quarantined and eradication thought viable. The New South Wales government spent $5 million attempting to eradicate the disease. However, efforts to contain it failed and it spread rapidly north and south along the eastern coast. In response to the increasing threat, a Myrtle Rust National Management Group was formed on 2 July 2010 with the aim of eradication however due to the extent of its spread at that point of time, the group conceded that it had become impossible to eradicate.

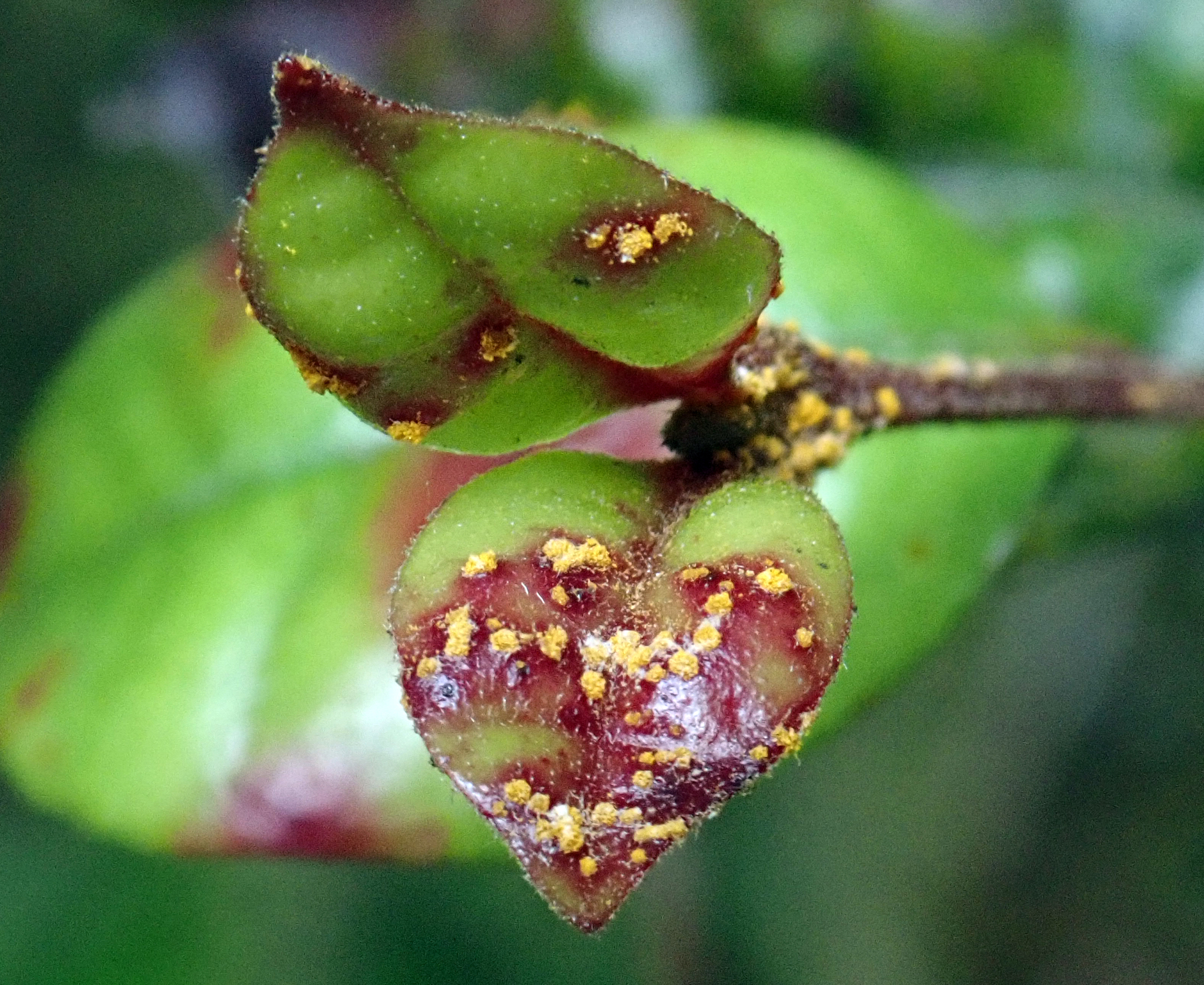
Myrtle rust on ramarama (Lophomyrtus bullata), a New Zealand tree.

By December 2010, it had significantly spread north along the coast and recorded in South East Queensland with isolated cases in Far North Queensland cities of Cairns and Townsville. In January 2012, an isolated myrtle rust outbreak was reported in Victoria beginning in Melbourne's southern and eastern suburbs. Initial attempts to contain it were unsuccessful and by April, 2012 it had spread across much of the state via regional cities.

By late 2015 myrtle rust was widespread in Queensland, NSW and Victoria. It has reached Tasmania, where it was detected in garden plants in the north-east in February 2015, and the Northern Territory, where it was detected on Melville Island in May 2015. The Tasmanian government is seeking to contain and eradicate myrtle rust from the state while the Northern Territory government has determined it is not possible to contain or eradicate the pathogen.

In April 2017, New Zealand's Ministry for Primary Industries reported that myrtle rust had been detected on Raoul Island, off the New Zealand mainland; the following month, it was detected on the mainland, in Kerikeri. As of 2020 it is spreading in New Zealand, and infecting pōhutukawa (Metrosideros excelsa), northern rātā (Metrosideros robusta), southern rātā (Metrosideros umbellata), ramarama (Lophomyrtus bullata) and rohutu Lophomyrtus obcordata.

== Host genera ==
Species within the following plant genera have been recorded with the infection:

- Acmena
- Agonis
- Angophora
- Asteromyrtus
- Austromyrtus
- Backhousia
- Callistemon
- Chamelaucium
- Choricarpia
- Decaspermum
- Eucalyptus
- Eugenia
- Gossia
- Lenwebbia
- Leptospermum
- Lophomyrtus
- Melaleuca
- Metrosideros
- Myrtus
- Pilidiostigma
- Rhodamnia
- Rhodomyrtus
- Ristantia
- Stockwellia
- Syncarpia
- Syzygium
- Tristania
- Ugni
- Uromyrtus
- Waterhousea
- Xanthostemon

== Environmental impacts ==
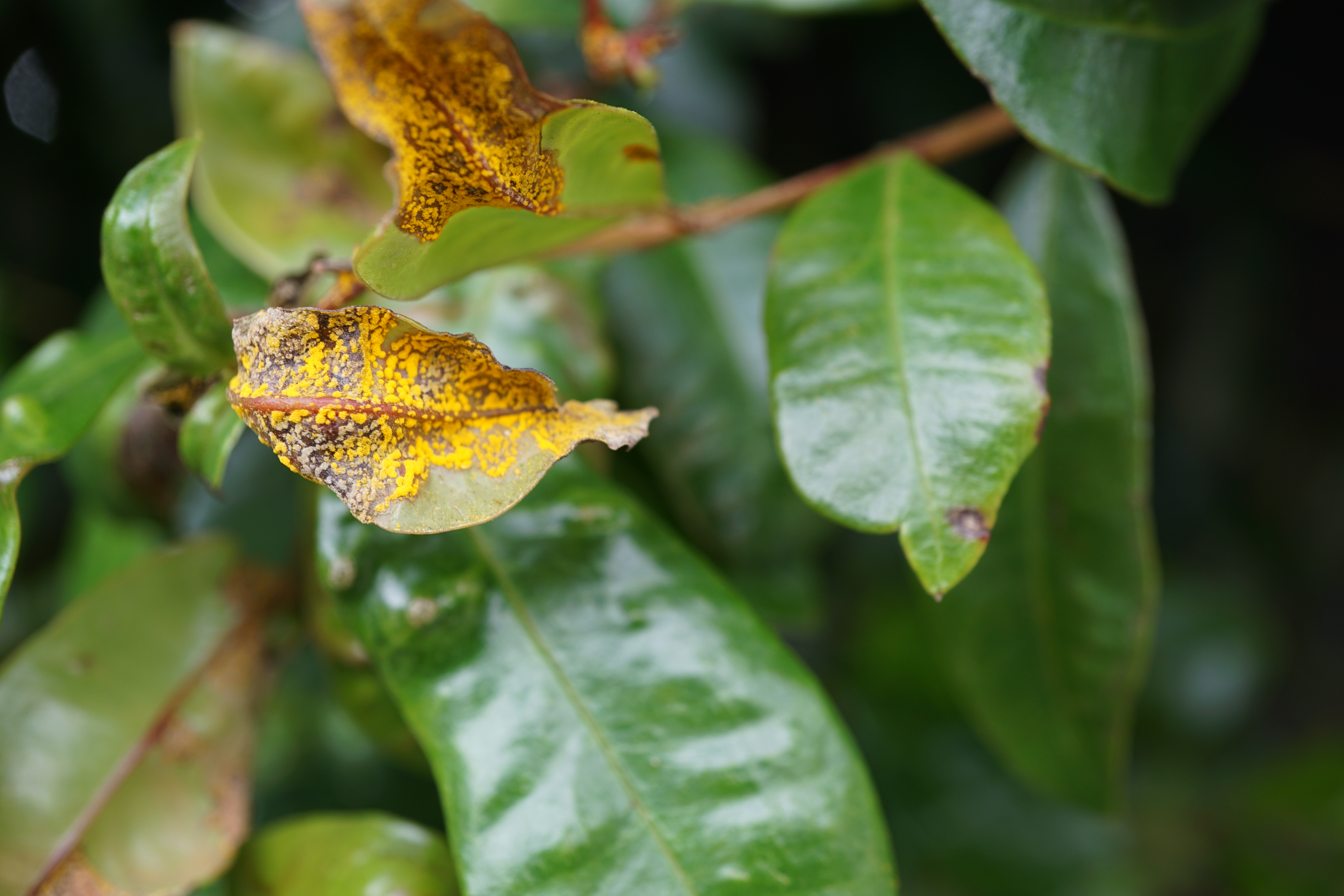
Myrtle rust on lilly pilly leaves.

Since first being detected in 2010, myrtle rust has spread rapidly with entire plant species now under threat. In Australia, the family Myrtaceae - which includes eucalypts, melaleuca and lilly pilly - is diverse, widespread and important to many native ecosystems.

The impact of myrtle rust has now been seen in a range of forest ecosystems including coastal heath, coastal and river wetlands, sand island ecosystems and subtropical and tropical rainforests. A number of plant species are now at risk of becoming extinct with about 40 plant species considered highly susceptible, such as the endangered Rhodamnia angustifolia.

Native animals are also likely to suffer significant impacts. Myrtle rust grows in shoots, fruits and flowers, destroying the food relied on by some species of flying foxes, lorikeets and honey eaters. There is the strong possibility that some of these species will become regionally extinct, and their loss could have serious flow-on effects.

== Life cycle and disease cycle ==
Rust fungi typically have complex life cycles that include stages of sexual and asexual reproduction that occasionally occur on phylogenetically distinct host plants. Austropuccinia psidii's life cycle is quite controversial with one study showing that the rust is autoecious while another study finding it to be heteroecious but with an alternate host that has yet to be found.

Looking at the fungus as a polycyclic pathogen, Stage I consists of aeciospores inoculating young leaf/shoot/fruit/flower bud. Once infected, aeciospores germinate and penetrate the host by creating a haustoria. Colonies and urediniosori forms after penetration. In Stage II, the production of urediniospores go back to inoculate young leaf/shoot/fruit/flower bud, important for secondary infection and contributing to the polycyclic nature of the pathogen. Stage II is also where urediniospores germinate, and penetration of the host occurs, resulting in the development of an uridiniosori. In Stage III, urediniospores germinate and the host is penetrated with the development of a haustoria. After penetration, colonies are formed and teliosori are developed. Teliosori produce teliospores which can further germinate. Once they're germinated, basidiospores are developed. In Stage IV, basidiospores are spread, inoculating young leaf/shoot/fruit/flower bud. As a result, basidiospores germinate penetrating the host with the development of a haustorium. Aeciosori is formed with the production of aeciospores and the cycle repeats.

== Infection pathway ==
Beginning with 1) extracellular pre-penetration processes (adhesion, germination, and appressorium formation 2) intercellular post-penetration processes (nutrient acquisition, ETS, ETI) and 3) dispersal of newly formed uredospores (reproduction and sporulation).

To infect the plant, uredospores must adhere to the leaf surface which can be enhanced by the secretion of extracellular compounds. Both physical and chemical cues by neutralized spore germination inhibitors induces germination and break dormancy. After the penetration of urediniospores by a combination of extracellular secretions and physical force, the germ tube is formed and elongated in a favorable area fueled by spore protein reserves from an appressorium. Once the hyphae is within the cell apoplast, the hyphae penetrates a host mesophyll cell to form a haustoria to acquire nutrients and suppress plant defenses. The hyphae and haustoria continually secrete effectors prevent plant resistance. Chemical signaling between plant and pathogen are continuously occurring to determine infection or any defense responses to the pathogen. Nutrient acquisition fuels pathogen growth by the accumulation of carbon from the host plant. This results in sporulation where the hyphae move toward plant surfaces to make urediniospores and to create a sori that ruptures through the dermal surface for penetration and infection.

== Management ==
The original plan to eradicate myrtle rust from Australia was declared to be infeasible by the Myrtle Rust National Management Group in December 2010. The Myrtle Rust Response Plan was cancelled and focus was placed on minimising the spread and the impacts on myrtle rust. The Australian Government, through the Department of Agriculture Fisheries and Forestry, established the Myrtle Rust Coordination Group to manage the investment of $1.5 million of research funding.

In 2016, The National Environmental Science Programme hosted a national workshop on myrtle rust to discuss research findings and future management options. Participants included the Cooperative Research Centre for Plant Biosecurity, state and federal agencies, and botanical and plant conservation experts. Discussions centred around the impact on native species in Australia. A key outcome of the workshop included agreement that there is a need for a nationally coordinated approach through a long-term National Action Plan which aims to ensure that no species or ecosystems are lost to its impact.

Practical measures to minimise the risk of increasing the distribution of myrtle rust include: not moving plant matter from one site to another; minimising pathogen spread by arriving and leaving each site clean of the pathogen, and avoiding areas that may contain myrtle rust-infected plant matter.
