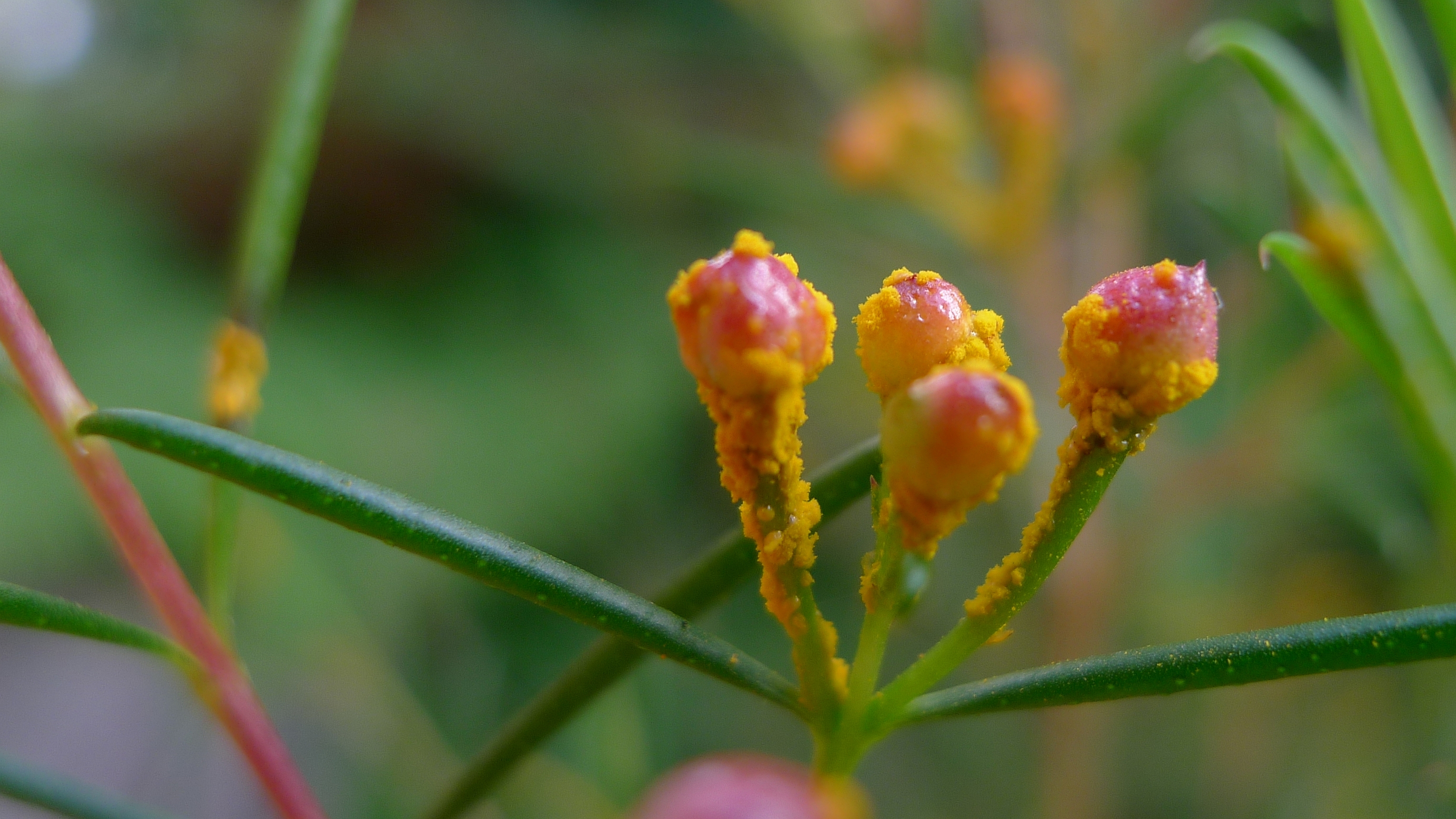
- Austropuccinia psidii

Scientific classification
- Domain: Eukaryota
- Kingdom: Fungi
- Division: Basidiomycota
- Class: Pucciniomycetes
- Order: Pucciniales
- Family: Sphaerophragmiaceae; Cummins & Y. Hirats.

= Sphaerophragmiaceae =

Family of fungi

The Sphaerophragmiaceae are a family of rust fungus genera in the order Pucciniales, based on the type genus Sphaerophragmium and placed in the suborder Uredinineae.

== Genera and species ==
In their 2021 review, Aime and McTaggart included two genera, containing the following species:

- Austropuccinia Beenken: monotypic - Austropuccinia psidii (G.Winter) Beenken
- Sphaerophragmium Magnus containing:
1. Sphaerophragmium acaciae (Cooke) Magnus
2. Sphaerophragmium albiziae Lohsomb., Kakish. & Y.Ono
3. Sphaerophragmium anisothele Speg.
4. Sphaerophragmium annulatipes Eboh
5. Sphaerophragmium artabotrydis Doidge
6. Sphaerophragmium boanense Cummins
7. Sphaerophragmium chevalieri Har. & Pat.
8. Sphaerophragmium clemensiae Syd.
9. Sphaerophragmium dalbergiae Dietel
10. Sphaerophragmium evernium Syd.
11. Sphaerophragmium fimbriatum Mains
12. Sphaerophragmium gabonense J.M.Yen
13. Sphaerophragmium gerstneri (Doidge) Beenken & Berndt
14. Sphaerophragmium guineense Vienn.-Bourg.
15. Sphaerophragmium irregulare Arthur & Cummins
16. Sphaerophragmium longicorne Eboh
17. Sphaerophragmium millettiae Vienn.-Bourg.
18. Sphaerophragmium mucunae Racib.
19. Sphaerophragmium ornatum Lohsomb., Kakish. & Y.Ono
20. Sphaerophragmium parkiae Dennis
21. Sphaerophragmium quadricellulare Alcorn & J.Walker
22. Sphaerophragmium silveirae Speg.
23. Sphaerophragmium sorghi Bat. & J.L.Bezerra
24. Sphaerophragmium xylopiae Beenken & Berndt
