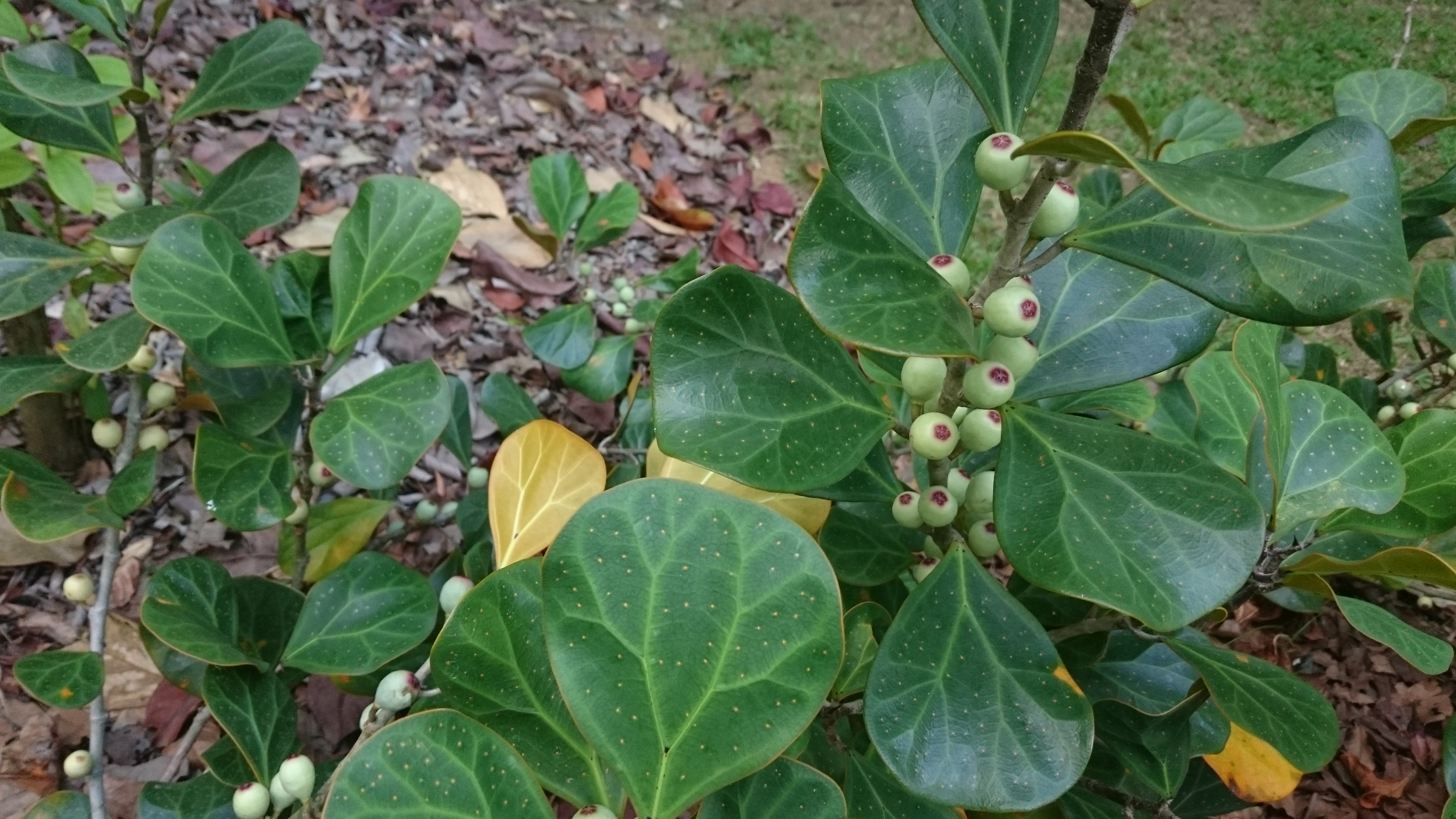

Conservation status
- Least Concern (IUCN 3.1)

Scientific classification
- Kingdom: Plantae
- Clade: Tracheophytes
- Clade: Angiosperms
- Clade: Eudicots
- Clade: Rosids
- Order: Myrtales
- Family: Myrtaceae
- Genus: Rhodamnia
- Species: R. cinerea

Binomial name
- Rhodamnia cinerea Jack

Synonyms
- Monoxora spectabilis (Blume) Wight; Myrtus globosa Korth.; Myrtus spectabilis Blume; Rhodamnia cinerea var. concolor Blume; Rhodamnia cinerea var. laxiflora Blume; Rhodamnia cinerea var. macrophylla Blume; Rhodamnia concolor (Blume) Miq.; Rhodamnia globosa (Korth.) Blume; Rhodamnia nageli Miq.; Rhodamnia spectabilis (Blume) Blume; Rhodamnia subtriflora Blume; Rhodamnia trinervia var. concolor (Blume) King; Rhodamnia trinervia var. spectabilis (Blume) King

= Rhodamnia cinerea =

Silverback

Species of tree

Rhodamnia cinerea is a rainforest tree of Southeast Asia, in the family Myrtaceae.

It is a small tree that grows up to 15 m. In Sundanese, this tree is called "ki beusi". The name 'Silverback' was given due to the silvery underside of the leaves for individuals growing in open country. The leaves (2–7 cm) are simple, opposite, oblong, with three main longitudinal veins.

The clustered flowers are small, white and fragrant, reddish at the centre.

The fruits are berries that turn from green to red then black when mature. Each has 3–8 seeds.
