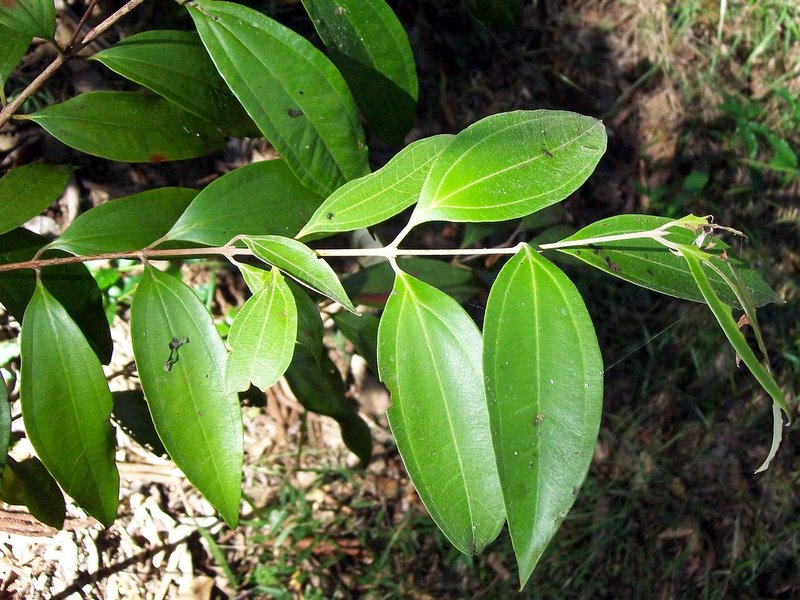
- Rhodamnia argentea

Scientific classification
- Kingdom: Plantae
- Clade: Embryophytes
- Clade: Tracheophytes
- Clade: Spermatophytes
- Clade: Angiosperms
- Clade: Eudicots
- Clade: Rosids
- Order: Myrtales
- Family: Myrtaceae
- Subfamily: Myrtoideae
- Tribe: Myrteae
- Genus: Rhodamnia; Jack

Synonyms
- Opanea Raf.; Monoxora Wight

= Rhodamnia =

Genus of flowering plants in the myrtle family

Rhodamnia is a group of rainforest trees and shrubs in the myrtle family described as a genus in 1822. They are native to southern China, Southeast Asia, Papuasia, Australia, and New Caledonia.

The name is derived from the Greek rhodon, which means "rose", and amnion, "bowl" where the blood of lambs was poured after sacrifice. It refers to the bowl-shaped calyx tubes. Leaves are opposite and mostly three veined in appearance. The fruit is a small berry with a few seeds.

Species

1. Rhodamnia acuminata – Qld
2. Rhodamnia andromedoides – NC
3. Rhodamnia angustifolia – Qld
4. Rhodamnia arenaria – Qld
5. Rhodamnia argentea – Malletwood – Qld, NSW
6. Rhodamnia asekiensis – PNG
7. Rhodamnia australis – Qld, NT
8. Rhodamnia blairiana – PNG, Qld
9. Rhodamnia cinerea – Nicobar, Myanmar, Thailand, W Malaysia, Borneo, Java, Sumatra
10. Rhodamnia costata – Qld
11. Rhodamnia daymanensis – PNG
12. Rhodamnia dumetorum – Hainan, Indochina, Langkawi
13. Rhodamnia dumicola – Qld
14. Rhodamnia fordii – Qld
15. Rhodamnia glabrescens – Qld
16. Rhodamnia glauca – Qld, PNG
17. Rhodamnia hylandii – Qld
18. Rhodamnia kamialiensis – PNG
19. Rhodamnia kerrii – N Thailand
20. Rhodamnia lancifolia – PNG
21. Rhodamnia latifolia – Maluku, NG, Bismarck
22. Rhodamnia longisepala – Qld
23. Rhodamnia maideniana – Smooth scrub turpentine – Qld, NSW
24. Rhodamnia makumak – PNG
25. Rhodamnia moluccana – Maluku, NG, Lesser Sunda, Java, Sulawesi
26. Rhodamnia mulleri – Borneo
27. Rhodamnia novoguineensis – Qld, NG
28. Rhodamnia pachyloba – Maluku, WNG
29. Rhodamnia parviflora – WNG
30. Rhodamnia pauciovulata – Qld
31. Rhodamnia reticulata – WNG
32. Rhodamnia rubescens – Brush turpentine – Qld, NSW
33. Rhodamnia sepicana – Maluku, NG, Solomon
34. Rhodamnia sessiliflora – Qld
35. Rhodamnia sharpeana – Qld, PNG
36. Rhodamnia tessellata – Sumatra
37. Rhodamnia toratot – PNG
38. Rhodamnia uniflora – W Malaysia, Borneo
39. Rhodamnia waigeoensis – Waigeo
40. Rhodamnia whiteana – Cliff malletwood – Qld, NSW
