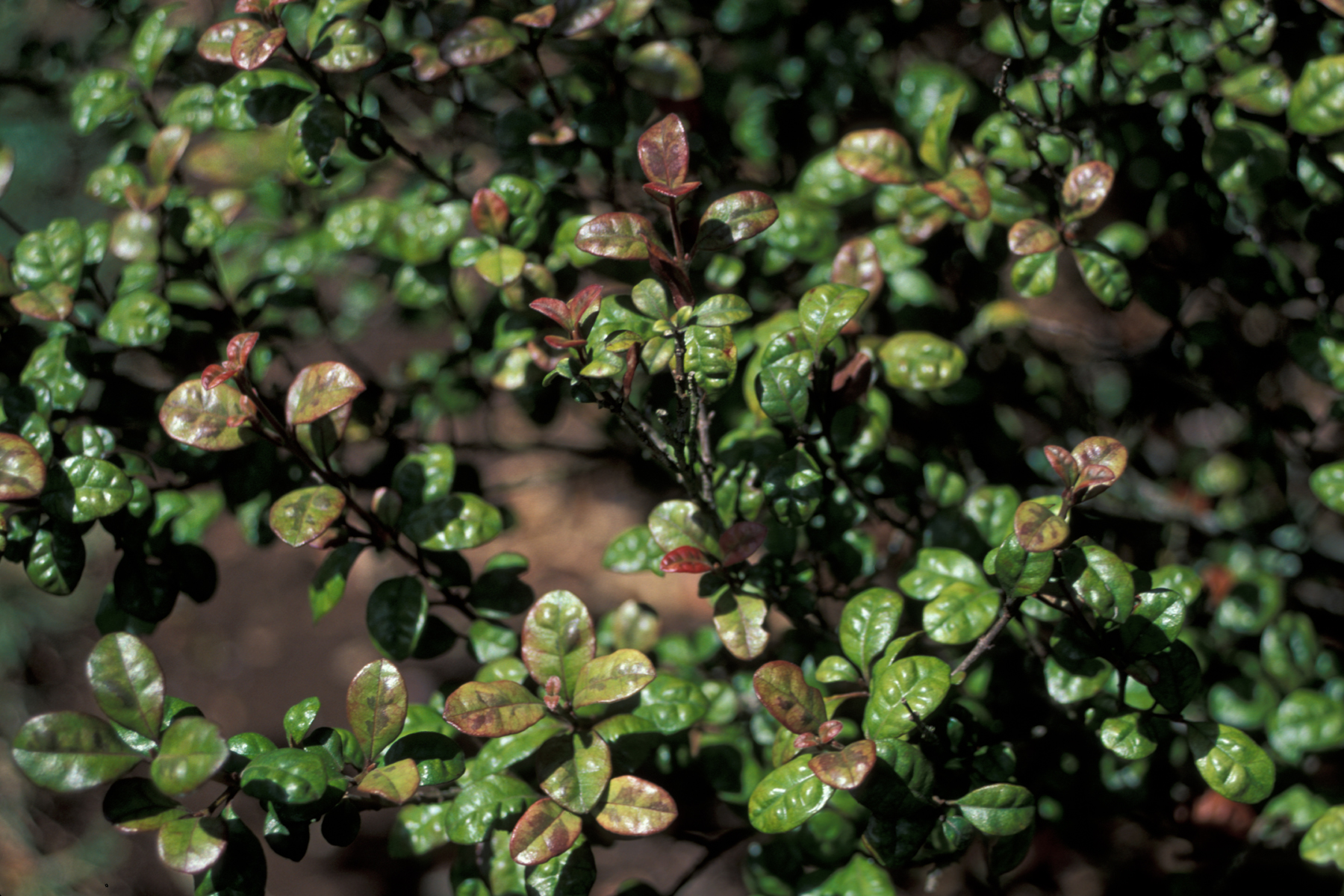

Scientific classification
- Kingdom: Plantae
- Clade: Tracheophytes
- Clade: Angiosperms
- Clade: Eudicots
- Clade: Rosids
- Order: Myrtales
- Family: Myrtaceae
- Subfamily: Myrtoideae
- Tribe: Myrteae
- Genus: Lophomyrtus; Burret

Type species
- Lophomyrtus bullata

= Lophomyrtus =

Genus of flowering plants in the myrtle family

Lophomyrtus is a genus of the myrtle family described as a genus in 1941. The entire genus is endemic to New Zealand. It consists of evergreen shrubs or trees, noted for their colorful leaves, which are purple, chocolate, red or bronze-green. There are also a number of cultivars. Planting in full sun aids the leaf color to develop. In cool climates, the plant may need to be placed in a sheltered area. They will also grow in semi shade. This genus is closely related to the Australian Lenwebbia which also has four petals and similar though less colourful leaves.

== Species ==
Image	Scientific name	Common name	Description	Distribution
	Lophomyrtus bullata	Ramarama	Evergreen shrub or small tree up to 5 m (16 ft) tall.It has glossy, heavily puckered (bullate) leaves and small creamy white flowers in summer that are followed by small, fleshy fruits that mature to a black-red shade. 'Maitai Bay' is a cultivar with especially showy red-brown foliage.	North Island of New Zealand and in the north of the South Island.
	Lophomyrtus obcordata	Rōhutu	Grows to around 8 m (26 ft) tall but is more tree-like in form. It has very small inversely heart-shaped (petiole at the pointed end) leaves and produces clusters of tiny white flowers in summer that are followed by small dark red to purple-red berries. The cultivars 'Dainty' and 'Microphylla' have pink-tinted leaves.	It occurs throughout New Zealand except for much of Southland.

== Hybrids ==
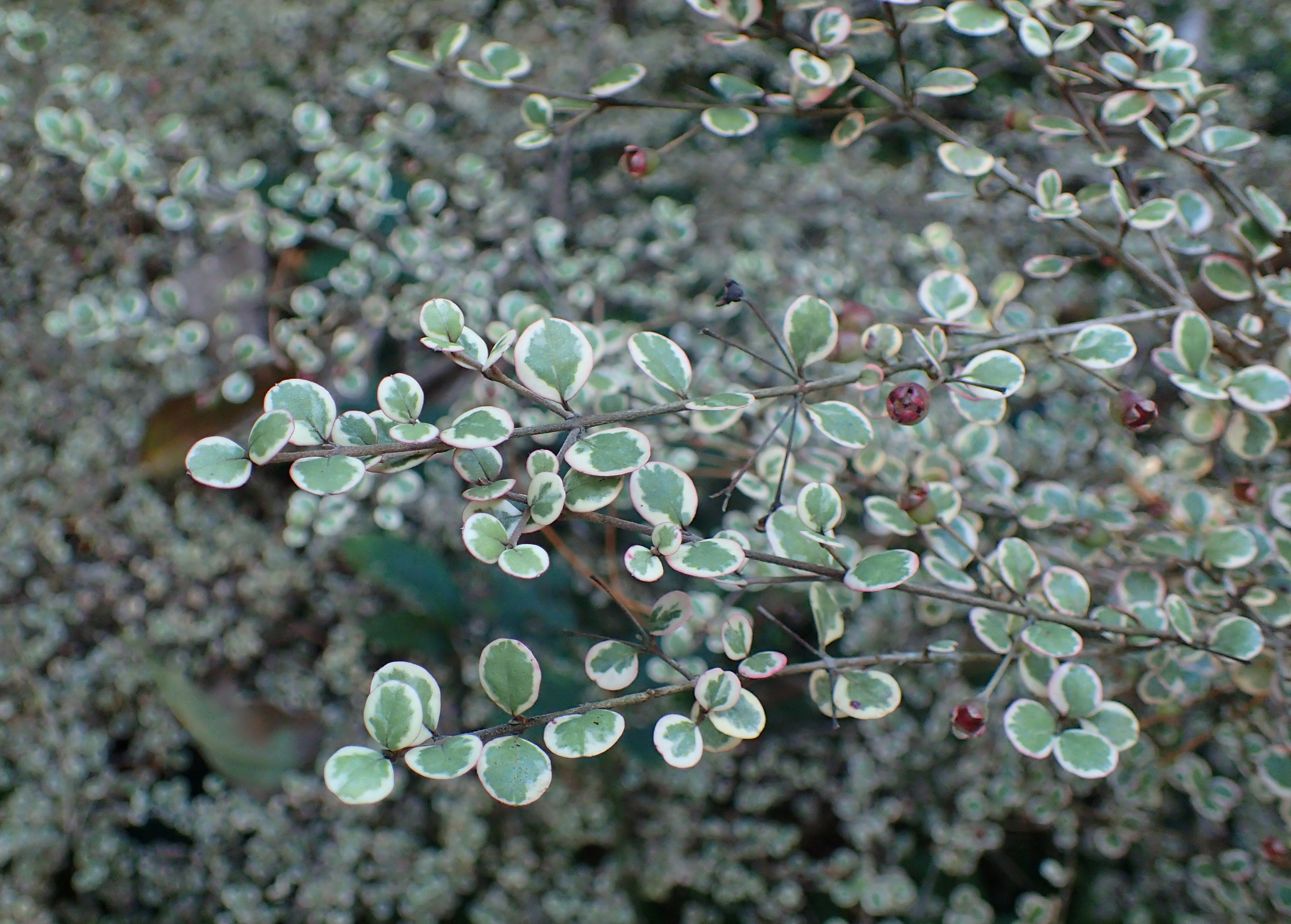
Lophomyrtus × ralphii

Most Lophomyrtus in gardens are hybrids between the two species. This cross, Lophomyrtus bullata × Lophomyrtus obcordata, is known as Lophomyrtus × ralphii and has produced many popular cultivars in a range of plant sizes and foliage colours. Among the most popular are: 'Kathryn', up to 3 m tall, deep purple-bronze foliage; 'Indian Chief', red-brown foliage that darkens in winter; 'Pixie', a compact form with small, bright, red-brown leaves; 'Little Star', a compact plant with small, rounded, cream-edged green leaves that are suffused with pink; 'Gloriosa', an upright cultivar to 2 m tall, cream-edged green leaves that develop pink tones, especially in winter; 'Black Beauty', narrow upright growth habit to 2 m tall, very dark red-brown foliage; and 'Red Dragon', up to 1.8m tall, narrow red leaves tapering to a point mature to a dark chocolate shade.

Lophomyrtus × ralphii cultivars are valued in gardens for their foliage and their ability to withstand regular trimming and shaping. Their flowers and fruit, while attractive and sometimes quite showy, are ornamentally incidental to the foliage.
