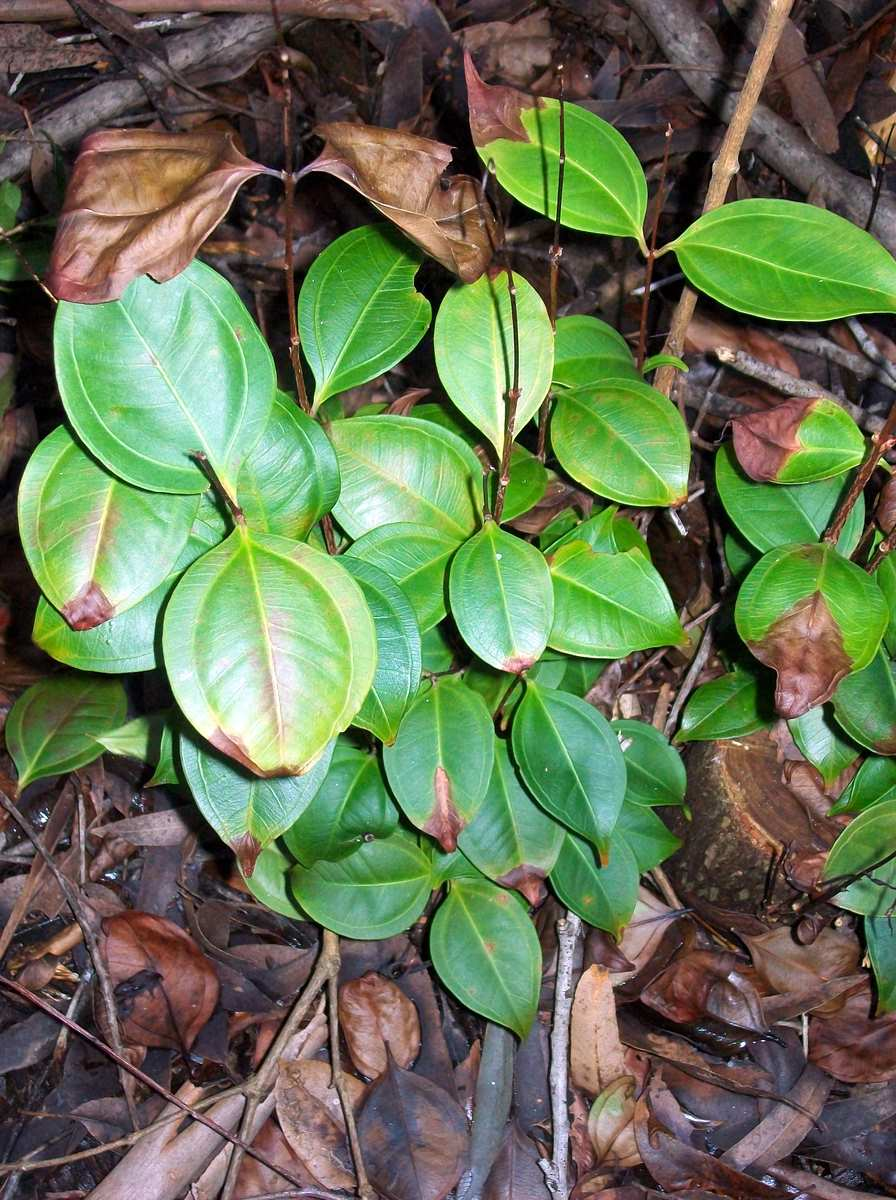
- coppice leaves of Rhodamnia maideniana

Conservation status
- Vulnerable (EPBC Act)

Scientific classification
- Kingdom: Plantae
- Clade: Tracheophytes
- Clade: Angiosperms
- Clade: Eudicots
- Clade: Rosids
- Order: Myrtales
- Family: Myrtaceae
- Genus: Rhodamnia
- Species: R. maideniana

Binomial name
- Rhodamnia maideniana C.T.White

Synonyms
- Rhodamnia trinervia var. glabra Maiden & Betche

= Rhodamnia maideniana =

Species of plant

Rhodamnia maideniana, known as the smooth scrub turpentine, is a rare sub-tropical rainforest plant of eastern Australia. It is listed on ROTAP with a rarity factor of 2RC-.

It occurs in coastal areas, north of the Richmond River, New South Wales and adjacent areas over the border into Queensland. A bushy shrub growing to 3 metres tall. The type specimen was collected by the Richmond River in April, 1891 by W. Bäuerlen.

The Generic name Rhodamnia is derived from the Greek Rhodon which means "rose". And aminon, "bowl" where the blood of lambs was poured after sacrifice. It refers to the bowl shaped calyx tubes. The specific epithet is named for the Australian botanist, Joseph Maiden.

Leaves are typical of this genus, being clearly three veined, 5 to 10 cm long, 2 to 4.5 cm wide. They are hairless, with a prominent drip tip. Oil dots may clearly be seen under a lens. The bark is similarly typical, being rough, fibrous and flaky. Small white flowers appear in late spring or early summer. The fruit is a black berry, around 10 mm in diameter.
