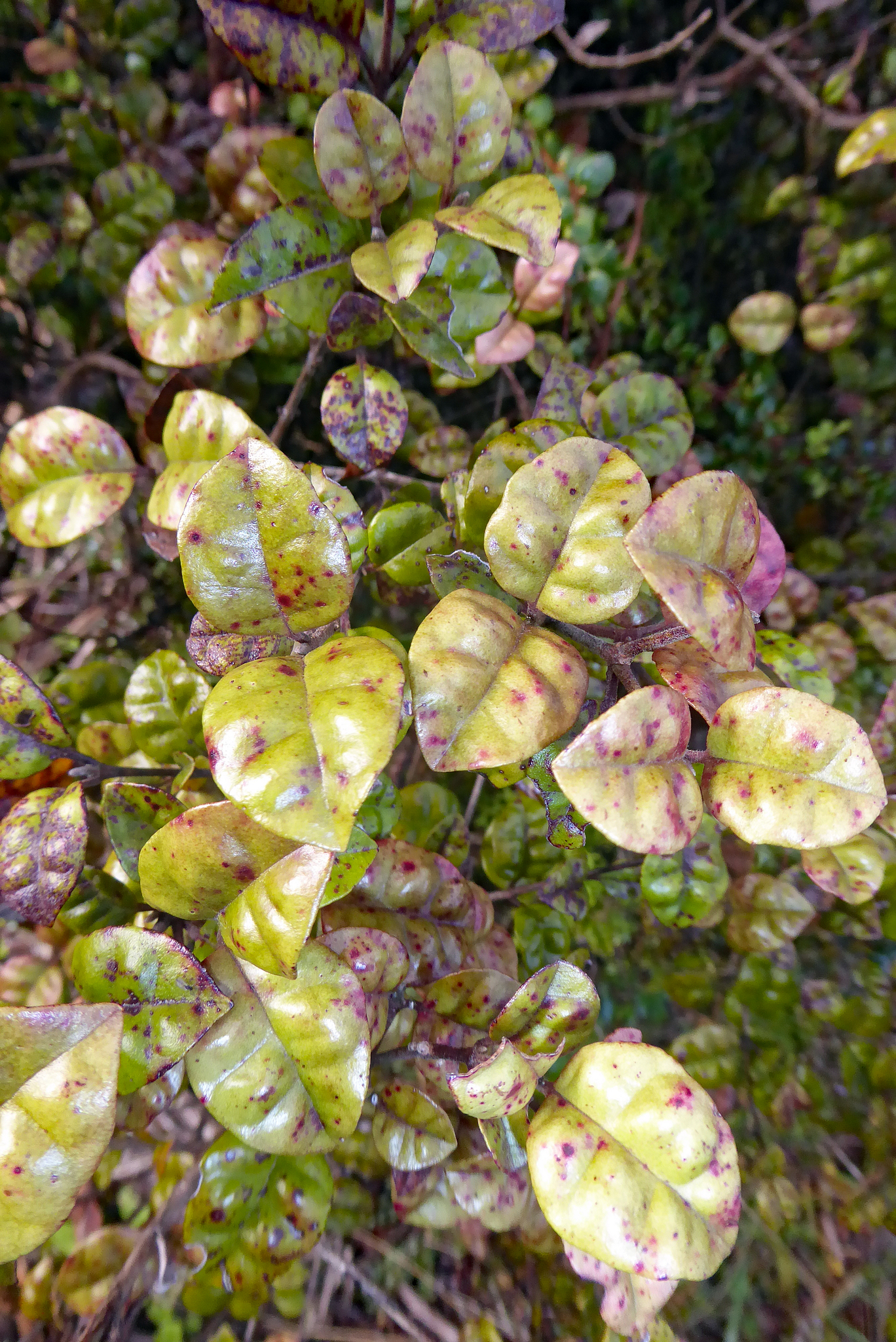
- Lophomyrtus bullata observed by New Zealand botanist Peter de Lange

Conservation status
- Least Concern (IUCN 3.1)

Scientific classification
- Kingdom: Plantae
- Clade: Tracheophytes
- Clade: Angiosperms
- Clade: Eudicots
- Clade: Rosids
- Order: Myrtales
- Family: Myrtaceae
- Genus: Lophomyrtus
- Species: L. bullata

Binomial name
- Lophomyrtus bullata Burret

Synonyms
- Lophomyrtus aotearoana E.C.Nelson, nom. illeg.; Myrtus aotearoana (E.C.Nelson) E.C.Nelson, not validly publ.; Myrtus bullata Banks & Sol. ex G.Benn., nom. illeg. homonym. post.; Myrtus bullata ramarama J.R.Duncan & V.C.Davies

= Lophomyrtus bullata =

Species of flowering plant

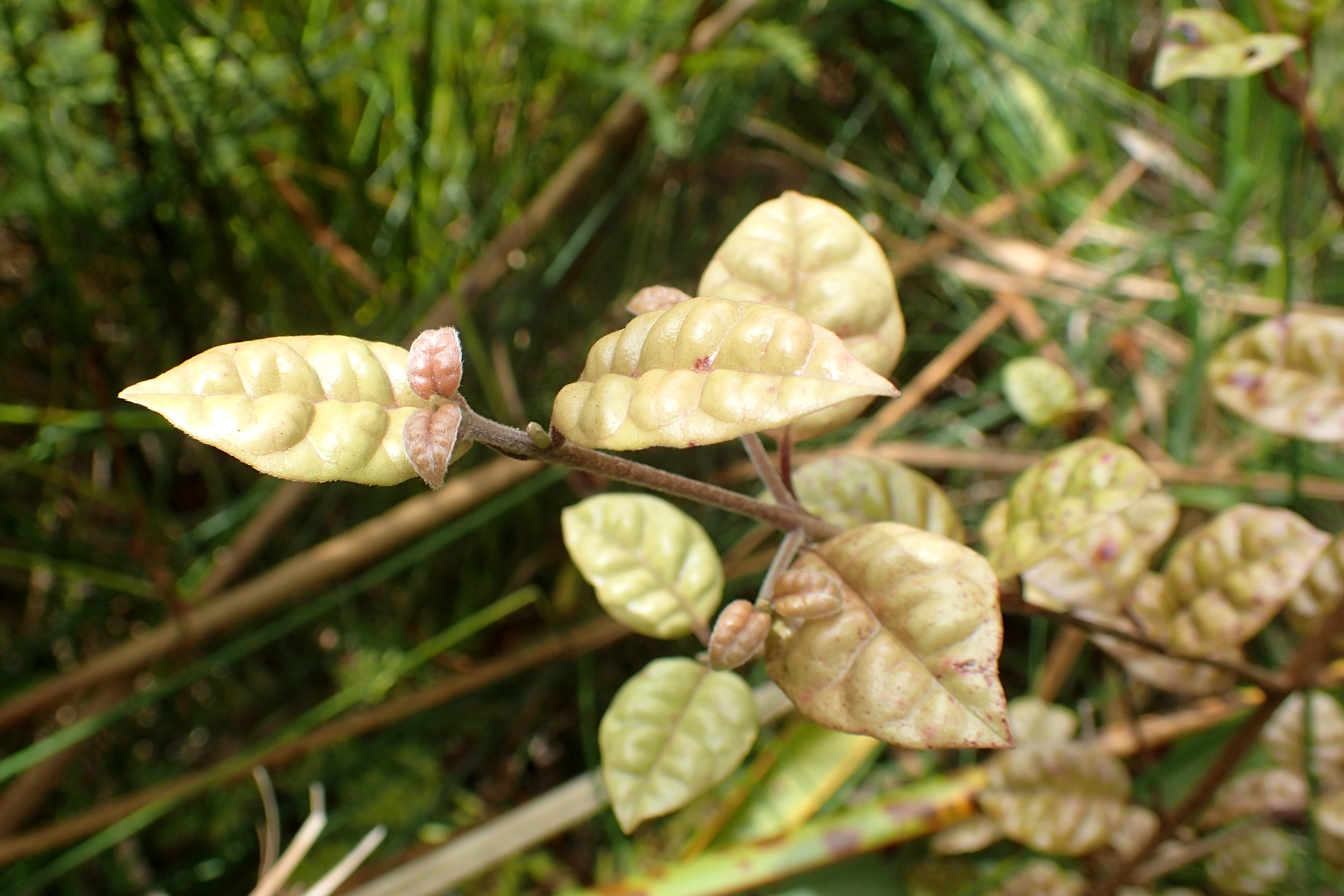
Ramarama growing in Auckland Botanic Gardens

Lophomyrtus bullata, also known by its Māori name of ramarama, is a species of evergreen myrtle shrub in the genus Lophomyrtus, family Myrtaceae. It is endemic to New Zealand.

Lophomyrtus bullata grows to a height of 8 metres, producing many branches closely packed together. The leaves are oval shaped, thick, shiny and bubbled, varying in colour from dark green to yellow green. They can also appear spotted with red, maroon, or blackish marks.

Ramarama flowers between November and March, and subsequently fruits from January through to June.

As of 2020, ramarama has become severely threatened by myrtle rust (Austropuccinia psidii), a pathogenic fungus that arrived in New Zealand in 2017.
