= Geography of the Bonin Islands =

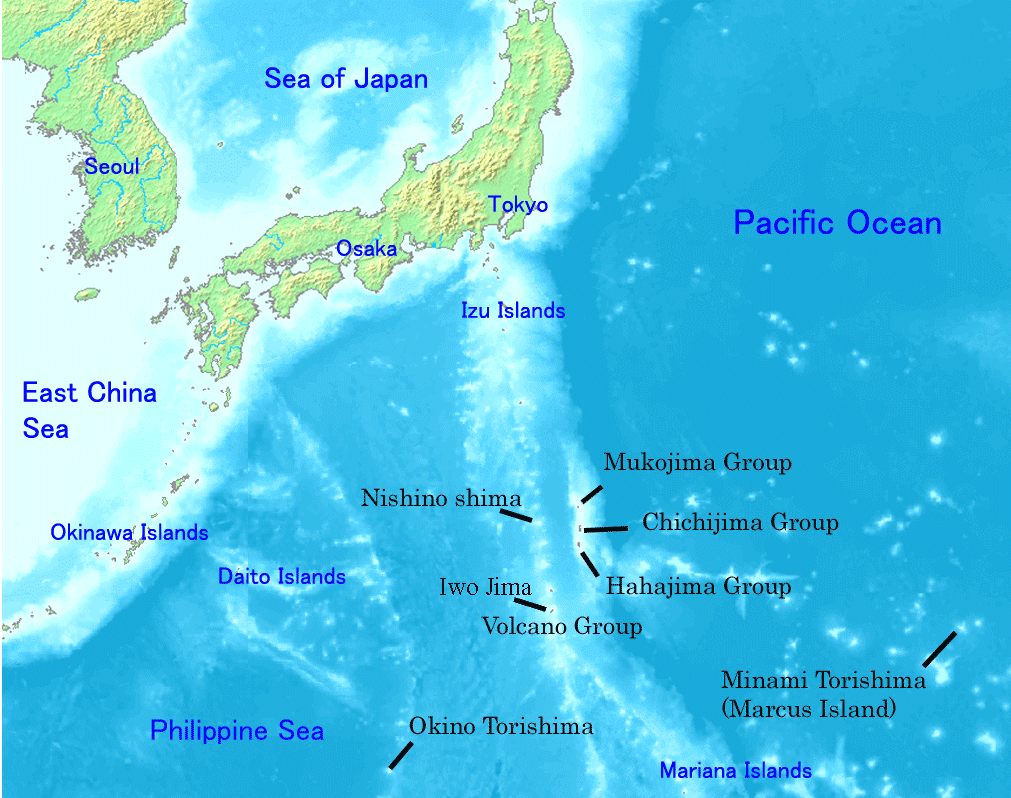
A map of the Bonin Islands

The Bonin Islands (Ogasawara Islands (小笠原群島, Ogasawara Guntō)) are an archipelago of over 30 subtropical and tropical islands, some 1,000 kilometres (540 nmi; 620 mi) directly south of Tokyo, Japan and 1,000 miles (870 nmi; 1,600 km) northwest of Guam.

Ogasawara Municipality (mura) and Ogasawara Subprefecture take their names from the Ogasawara Group. Ogasawara Archipelago (小笠原諸島, Ogasawara shotō) is also used as a wider collective term that includes other islands in Ogasawara Municipality, such as the Volcano Islands, along with three other remote islands (Nishinoshima, Minami-Tori-shima and Okinotorishima). Geographically speaking, all of these islands are part of the Nanpō Islands.

The islands have a total population of 2,560 (2021): 2,120 on Chichijima and 440 on Hahajima, lives in the Ogasawara Group, which has a total area of 84 square kilometres (32 sq mi).

Because the Ogasawara Islands have never been connected to a continent, many of their animals and plants have undergone unique evolutionary processes. This has led to the islands' nickname of "The Galápagos of the Orient", and their nomination as a natural World Heritage Site on June 24, 2011. The giant squid (genus Architeuthis) was photographed off the Ogasawara Islands for the first time in the wild on 30 September 2004, and was filmed alive there in December 2006.

== Administration and islands ==
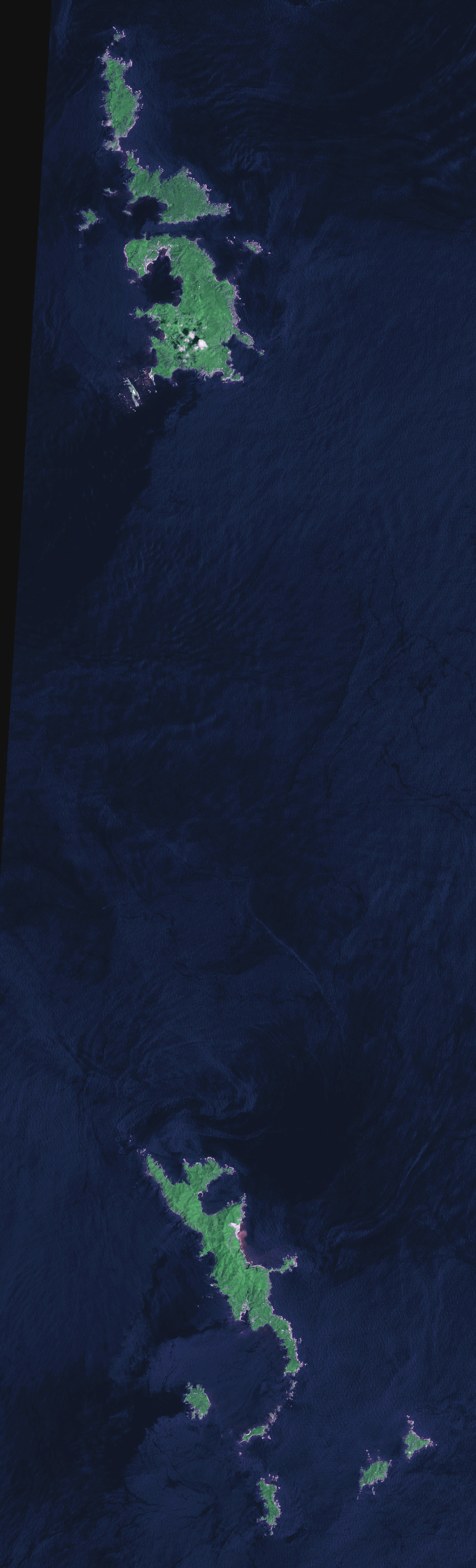
Satellite photo of Chichijima and Hahajima

The Bonin Islands consist of three subgroups, which are listed below along with their main islands:

- Muko-jima Group (聟島列島 Muko-jima Rettō) – formerly Parry Group:
  - Muko-jima (聟島, lit. 'Bridegroom Island');
  - Yome-jima (嫁島, lit. 'Bride Island') – formerly Kater I.;
  - Nakōdo-jima or Nakadachi-jima (媒島, lit. 'Matchmaker Island');
  - Kita-no-jima (北の島 or 北島, lit. 'Northern Island');
  - Mae-jima – formerly the Ears;
- Chichi-jima Group (父島列島 Chichi-jima Rettō) – formerly Beechey Group:
  - Chichi-jima (父島, lit. 'Father Island') – formerly Main I./Peel I.;
  - Ani-jima (兄島, lit. 'Elder Brother Island') – formerly Hog I./Buckland I.;
  - Otōto-jima (弟島, lit. 'Younger Brother Island') – formerly North I./Stapleton I.;
  - Mago-jima (孫島 lit. 'Grandchild Island');
  - Higashi-jima (東島 lit. 'East Island')
  - Nishi-jima (西島 lit. 'West Island') – formerly Goat I.;
  - Minami-jima (南島 lit. 'South Island') – formerly Knorr I.;
- Haha-jima Group (母島列島 Haha-jima Rettō) – formerly Baily Group or Coffin Islands:
  - Haha-jima (母島, lit. 'Mother Island') – formerly Hillsborough I.;
  - Mukō-jima (向島, lit. 'Island Over There') – formerly Plymouth I.;
  - Hira-jima or Taira-jima (平島, lit. 'Flat Island')
  - Ane-jima (姉島, lit. 'Elder Sister Island') – formerly Perry I.;
  - Imōto-jima (妹島, lit. 'Younger Sister Island') – formerly Kelly I.;
  - Mei-jima (姪島, lit. 'Niece Island')

Administratively, the Volcano Islands, Nishinoshima (Rosario Island), Okinotorishima (Parece Vela), and Minamitorishima (Marcus Island), are today part of Ogasawara municipality. It is a Subprefecture of Tokyo Metropolis. Geographically, they are not traditionally considered part of the Bonin Islands, which are the Mukojima, Chichijima, and Hahajima island clusters. In other words, the historical range of the Bonin Islands (Ogasawara Guntō) is not the precise equivalent of the Japanese governmental unit. The Bonin Islands is a geographical term excluding the other islands which are today associated within the boundaries of a collective term, Ogasawara Shotō.

== Geology ==
The Ogasawara (Bonin) Islands were formed around 48 million years ago. They are a part of the Izu–Bonin–Mariana Arc known geologically as a fore arc. They lie above a subduction zone between the Pacific Plate and the Philippine Sea Plate. The Pacific Plate is subducting under the Philippine Sea Plate, which creates an oceanic trench to the east of the islands: the Bonin Trench. The crust of the Ogasawara Islands was formed by volcanic activity when subduction began 45–50 million years ago, and is composed mostly of an andesitic volcanic rock called boninite, which is rich in magnesium oxide, chromium, and silicon dioxide. The Ogasawara Islands may represent the exposed parts of an ophiolite that has not yet been emplaced on oceanic crust. The rocks of the Volcano Islands are much younger; Iwo Jima is a dormant volcano characterized by rapid uplift and several hot springs. In November 2013, a new volcanic island formed offshore from Nishinoshima and eventually merged with Nishinoshima, enlarging it.

Most of the islands have steep shorelines, often with sea cliffs ranging from 50 to 100 metres (160 to 330 ft) in height, but the islands are also fringed with coral reefs and have many beaches. The highest point lies on South Iwo Jima, at 916 metres (3,005 ft).

== Climate ==
The climate of the Ogasawara Islands ranges from a humid subtropical climate (Köppen climate classification Cfa) to tropical monsoon climate (Köppen climate classification Am).

The climate of Chichi-jima in is on the boundary between the humid subtropical climate (Köppen classification Cfa) and the tropical monsoon climate (Köppen classification Am). Temperatures are warm to hot all year round owing to the warm currents from the North Pacific gyre that surround the island. Rainfall is less heavy than in most parts of mainland Japan since the island is too far south to be influenced by the Aleutian Low and too far from Asia to receive monsoonal rainfall or orographic precipitation on the equatorward side of the Siberian High. The wettest months are May and September, while the driest months are January and February.

Climate data for Chichijima of the Ogasawara Islands (1991–2020)
Month	Jan	Feb	Mar	Apr	May	Jun	Jul	Aug	Sep	Oct	Nov	Dec	Year
Mean daily maximum °C (°F)	20.7 (69.3)	20.5 (68.9)	21.7 (71.1)	23.4 (74.1)	25.6 (78.1)	28.5 (83.3)	30.4 (86.7)	30.3 (86.5)	29.9 (85.8)	28.6 (83.5)	25.9 (78.6)	22.7 (72.9)	25.7 (78.3)
Daily mean °C (°F)	18.5 (65.3)	18.1 (64.6)	19.3 (66.7)	21.1 (70.0)	23.4 (74.1)	26.2 (79.2)	27.7 (81.9)	28.0 (82.4)	27.7 (81.9)	26.4 (79.5)	23.8 (74.8)	20.6 (69.1)	23.4 (74.1)
Mean daily minimum °C (°F)	15.8 (60.4)	15.4 (59.7)	16.8 (62.2)	18.8 (65.8)	21.4 (70.5)	24.4 (75.9)	25.6 (78.1)	26.1 (79.0)	25.7 (78.3)	24.4 (75.9)	21.6 (70.9)	18.2 (64.8)	21.2 (70.2)
Average rainfall mm (inches)	63.6 (2.50)	51.6 (2.03)	75.8 (2.98)	113.3 (4.46)	151.9 (5.98)	111.8 (4.40)	79.5 (3.13)	123.3 (4.85)	144.2 (5.68)	141.7 (5.58)	136.1 (5.36)	103.3 (4.07)	1,296.1 (51.02)
Average rainy days (≥ 0.5 mm)	11.0	8.5	9.8	10.0	11.8	8.8	8.6	11.3	13.4	13.7	12.0	11.2	130.1
Average relative humidity (%)	66	68	72	79	84	86	82	82	82	81	76	70	77
Mean monthly sunshine hours	131.3	138.3	159.2	148.3	151.8	205.6	246.8	213.7	197.7	173.2	139.1	125.3	2,030.3
Source: Japan Meteorological Agency

The Ogasawara Islands' easternmost island, Minamitorishima (Marcus Island), has the tropical savanna climate (Köppen classification Aw) with warm to hot temperatures throughout the year. The wettest months are July and August, while the driest months are February and March.

Climate data for Minamitorishima of the Ogasawara Islands (1991–2020)
Month	Jan	Feb	Mar	Apr	May	Jun	Jul	Aug	Sep	Oct	Nov	Dec	Year
Mean daily maximum °C (°F)	24.6 (76.3)	24.3 (75.7)	25.3 (77.5)	27.1 (80.8)	29.0 (84.2)	31.0 (87.8)	31.3 (88.3)	31.0 (87.8)	30.9 (87.6)	30.2 (86.4)	28.7 (83.7)	26.7 (80.1)	28.3 (82.9)
Daily mean °C (°F)	22.4 (72.3)	21.8 (71.2)	22.5 (72.5)	24.3 (75.7)	26.1 (79.0)	28.0 (82.4)	28.5 (83.3)	28.4 (83.1)	28.5 (83.3)	27.9 (82.2)	26.5 (79.7)	24.5 (76.1)	25.8 (78.4)
Mean daily minimum °C (°F)	20.3 (68.5)	19.6 (67.3)	20.4 (68.7)	22.3 (72.1)	24.1 (75.4)	25.8 (78.4)	26.1 (79.0)	26.1 (79.0)	26.4 (79.5)	25.9 (78.6)	24.7 (76.5)	22.6 (72.7)	23.7 (74.7)
Average rainfall mm (inches)	69.7 (2.74)	43.4 (1.71)	56.0 (2.20)	59.6 (2.35)	100.6 (3.96)	44.3 (1.74)	139.8 (5.50)	177.1 (6.97)	94.8 (3.73)	89.6 (3.53)	83.0 (3.27)	90.8 (3.57)	1,052.8 (41.45)
Average rainy days (≥ 0.5 mm)	10.9	8.5	8.1	7.8	9.3	7.2	14.8	16.7	14.1	12.7	10.4	11.8	132.3
Average relative humidity (%)	70	70	74	79	79	77	77	79	79	78	76	74	76
Mean monthly sunshine hours	170.8	179.4	222.3	240.2	275.1	311.2	276.3	248.1	254.6	250.8	211.0	182.3	2,821.7
Source: Japan Meteorological Agency

== Ecology ==
=== Flora ===
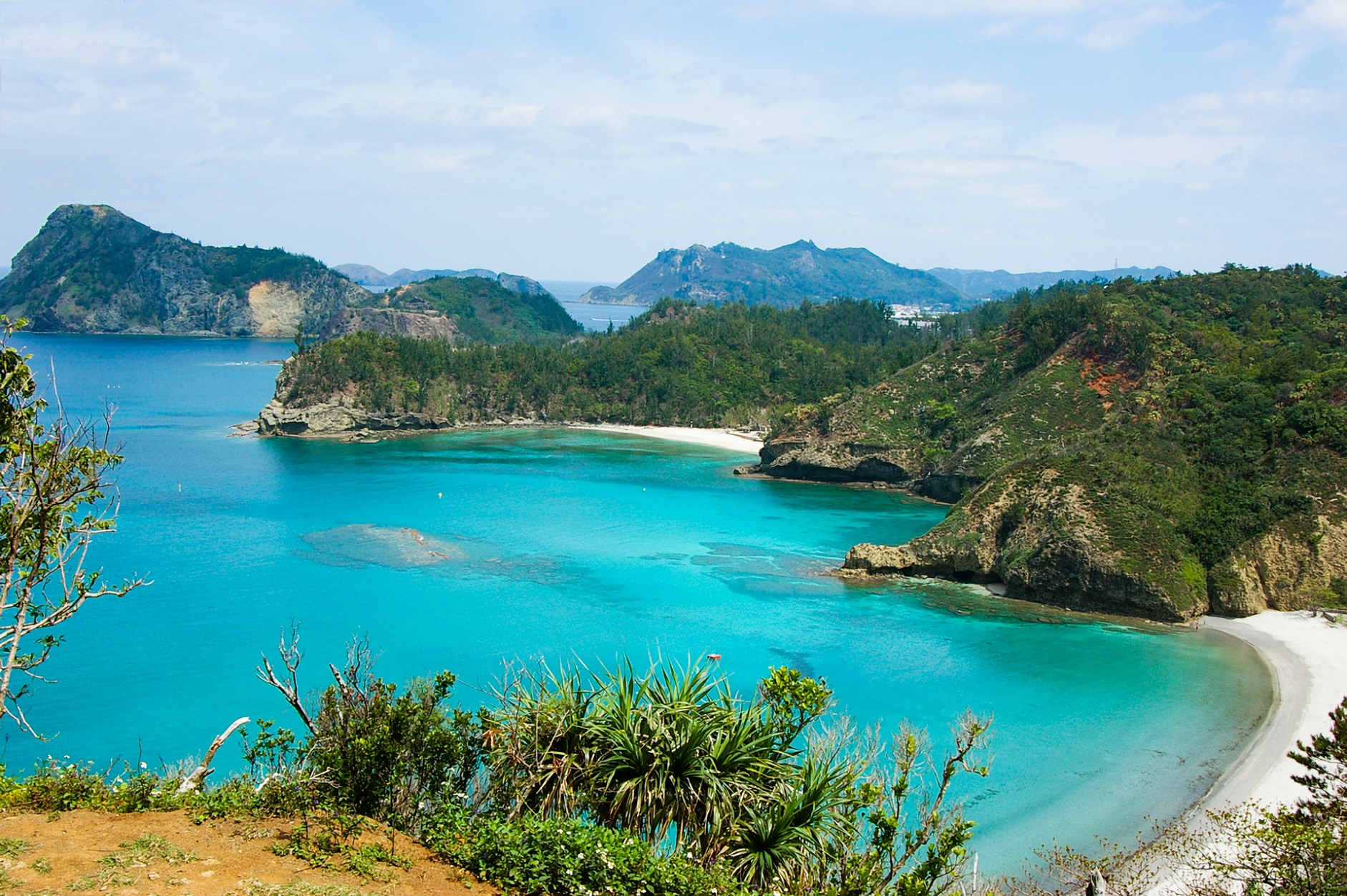
Kominato beach and Kopepe Beach, Chichi-jima

Flora has evolved differently on each of the islands. The Ogasawara Islands are sometimes referred to as the Galápagos of the Orient.

These islands are home to the northernmost outliers of the palm genus Clinostigma. C. savoryianum is endemic and has been planted in mediterranean climates often with success. Other unique species include Metrosideros boninensis, a plant related to similar species growing in Fiji and New Caledonia.

The Ogasawara Archipelago forms a distinct subtropical moist broadleaf forest ecoregion, the Ogasawara subtropical moist forests. The ecoregion has a high degree of biodiversity and endemism. The islands are home to about 500 plant species, of which 43% are endemic. The forests are of three main types:

- Type I: Elaeocarpus–Ardisia mesic forest is found in the moist lowland areas with deep soils. The forests have a closed canopy with a height of about 15 metres (49 ft), dominated by Ardisia sieboldii. Elaeocarpus photiniaefolius, Pisonia umbellifera, and Planchonella obovata are other important canopy species. These forests were almost completely destroyed by clearing for agriculture before 1945.
- Type II: Distylium–Raphiolepis–Schima dry forest is found in drier lowland and upland sites with shallower soils. It is also a closed-canopy forest, with a 4-to-8-metre (13 to 26 ft) canopy composed mostly of Distylium lepidotum, Rhaphiolepis integerrima, Schima mertensiana, Planchonella obovata, and Syzygium buxifolium. The Type II forests can be further subdivided into:
  - Type IIa: Distylium-Schima dry forest occurs in cloudy upland areas with fine-textured soils. These forests contain many rare and endemic species, with Pandanus boninensis and Syzygium buxifolium as the predominant trees.
  - Type IIb: Raphiolepis-Livistona dry forest is found in upland areas with few clouds and rocky soils. Rhaphiolepis integerrima is the dominant tree species, along with the fan palm Livistona boninensis, Pandanus boninensis and Ochrosia nakaiana.
- Type III: Distylium-Planchonella scrub forest is found on windy and dry mountain ridges and exposed sea cliffs. These forests have the highest species diversity on the islands. Distylium lepidotum and Planchonella obovata are the dominant species, growing from 0.5 to 1.5 metres (1.6 to 4.9 ft) tall. Other common shrubs are Myrsine okabeana, Symplocos kawakamii, and Pittosporum parvifolium.

=== Fauna ===
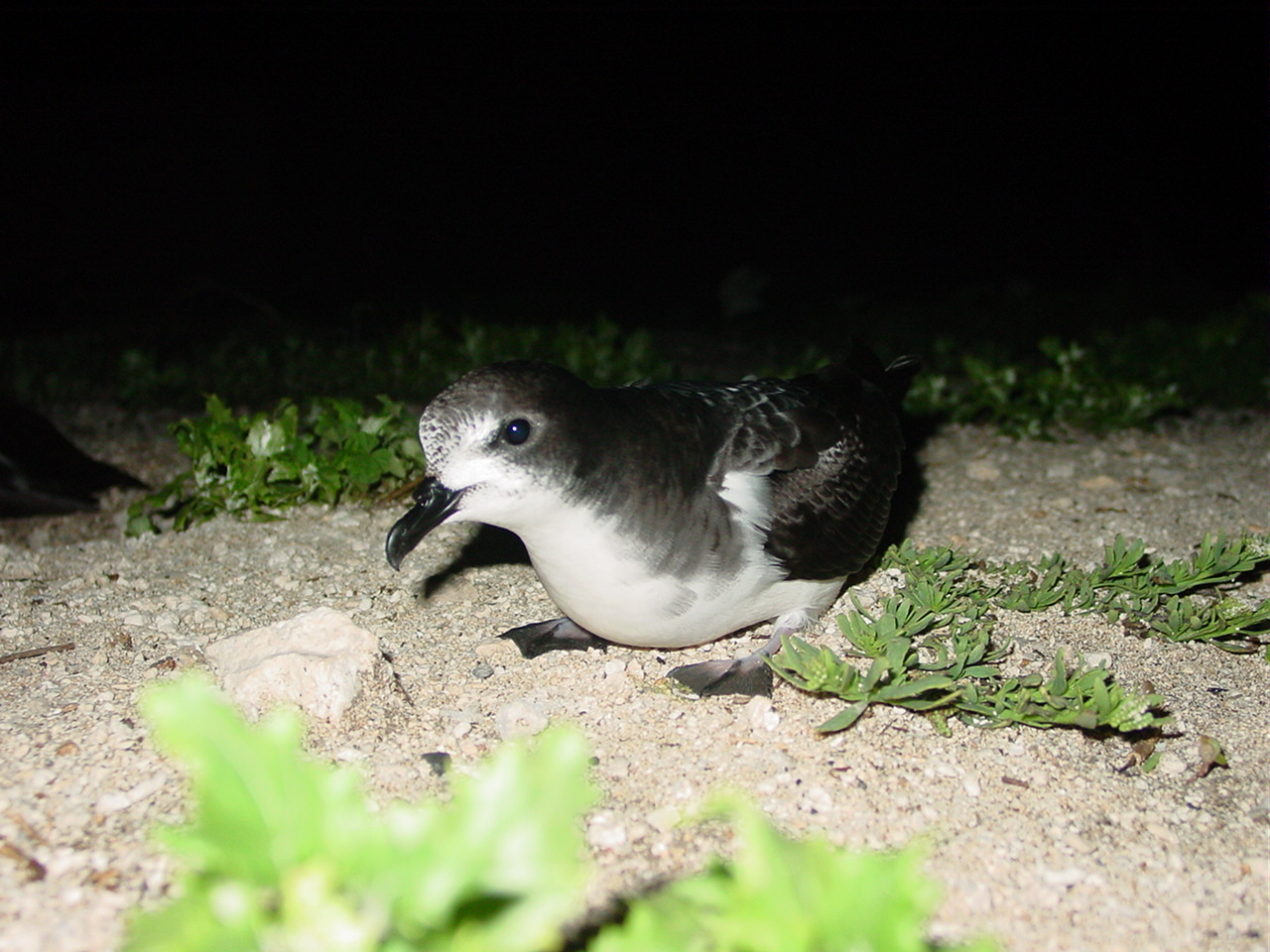
A Bonin petrel

The range of the Bonin petrel extends beyond the Ogasawaras to include other islands in the northern Pacific region.

There are two restricted-range species of birds on the islands; the Japanese woodpigeon (Columba janthina) and the Near Threatened Bonin white-eye (Apalopteron familiare), formerly known as "Bonin honeyeater". The Japanese woodpigeon was extirpated in the Iwo Island groups in the 1980s. The formerly endemic Bonin pigeon (Columba versicolor), Bonin thrush (Zoothera terrestris) and Bonin grosbeak (Carpodacus ferreorostris) are now extinct.

A small bat, Sturdee's pipistrelle, is only known in one record and has not been seen since 1915. The Bonin flying fox (Pteropus pselaphon), also called the Bonin fruit bat, is endemic to the islands. It is currently listed as Endangered, and a survey published by the Ogasawara Office of Education in 1999 estimated their number to be around 100.

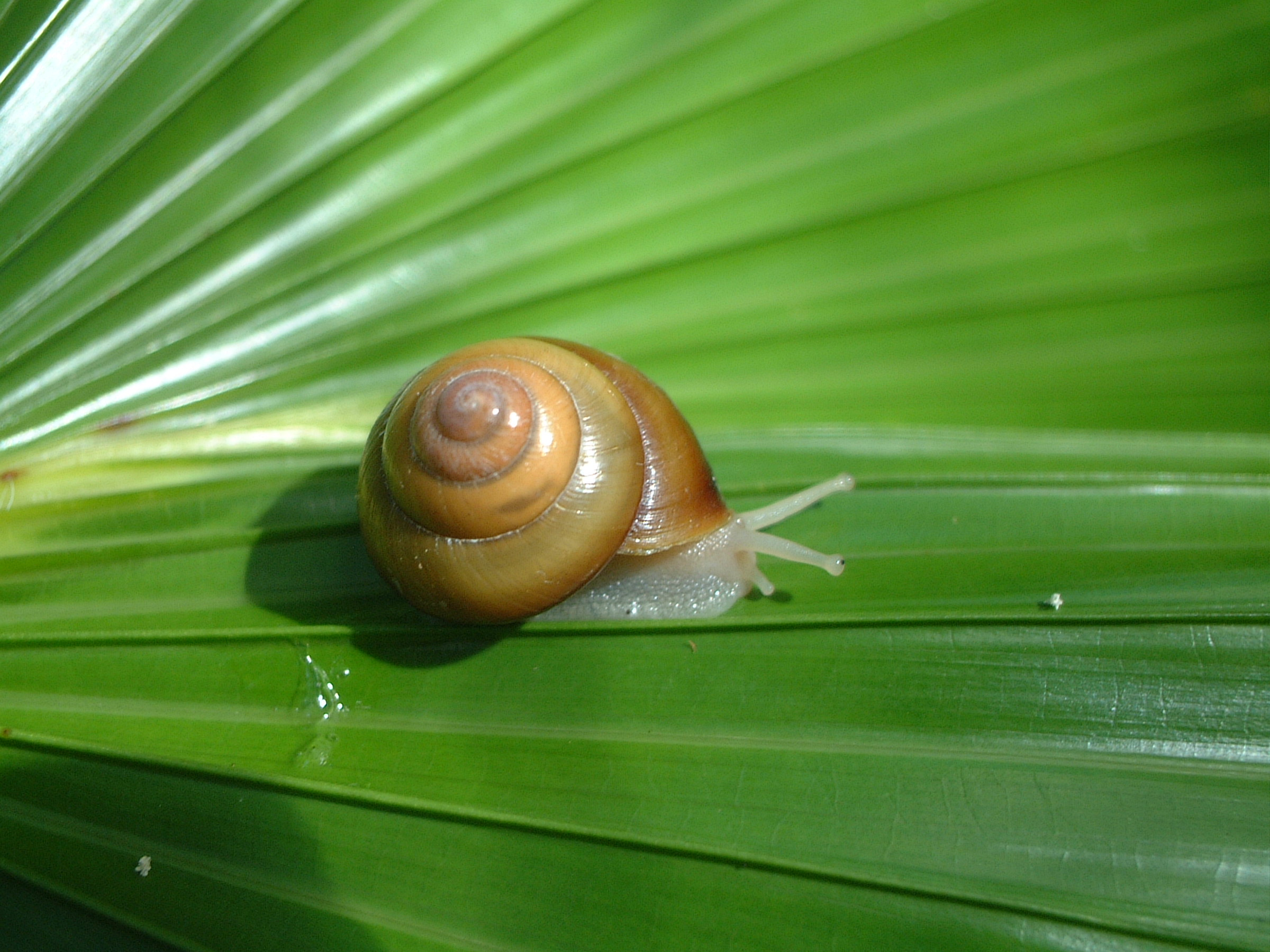
Mandarina suenoae from Anijima, Ogasawara

The islands are also renowned for the many species of snail that are found across the islands, especially the Mandarina snails. Unfortunately, most of the native snails are now endangered or extinct, because of introduced species and habitat loss.

== See also ==
- Volcano Islands
- Northern Mariana Islands
