= Ogasawara subtropical moist forests =

Ecoregion in the Ogasawara Islands, Japan

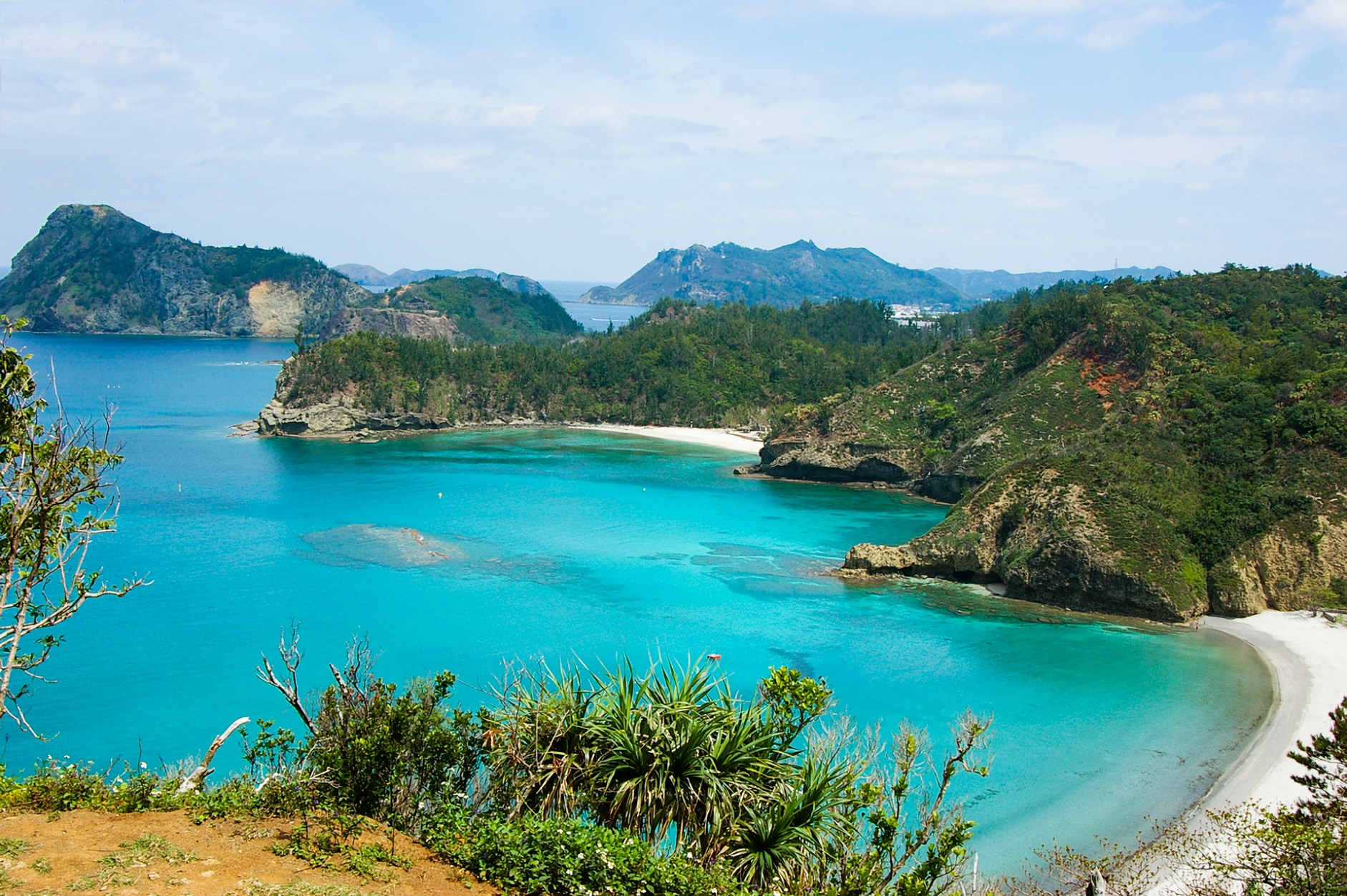
- Kominato beach and Kopepe Beach, Chichijima

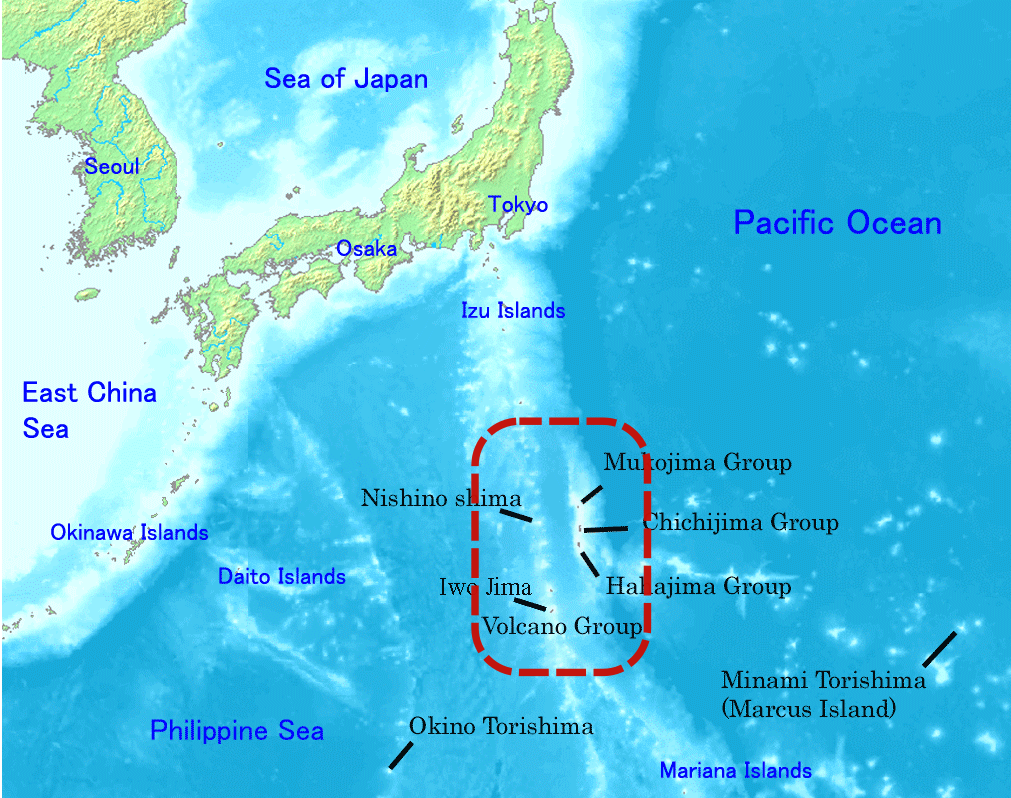
- Ecoregion territory (islands inside red-dashed box)

Ecology
- Realm: Oceanian
- Biome: tropical and subtropical moist broadleaf forests

Geography
- Area: 96 km^{2} (37 sq mi)
- Country: Japan

Conservation
- Protected: 73 km² (73%)

The Ogasawara subtropical moist forests is a terrestrial ecoregion which encompasses the Ogasawara Archipelago of Japan. The Ogasawara Archipelago lies in the Pacific Ocean south of Honshu, Japan's largest island, and north of the Marianas Islands. The ecoregion includes the Bonin Islands and Volcano Islands chains. The islands are volcanic in origin, and have never been linked to a continent. They are home to distinct plants and animals including many endemic species.

The islands also constitute a distinct freshwater ecoregion (Ogasarawa Islands - Kazan Archipelago).

== Geography ==
The Bonin Islands are about 1000 km south of Honshu, Japan's largest island, and north of the Tropic of Cancer. The Bonin islands form three clusters, Mukojima, Chichijima, and Hahajima, composed of one larger island and several smaller ones. Chichishima, the largest island, and Hahajima, the second-largest, are the only inhabited Bonin islands. The highest point on Hahajima is 326 m, and Chichishima's highest point is 462 m. The Bonin Islands have sea cliffs along the shore. The center of Chichishima and other islands in the group (Ani-shima and Ototo-shima) is rolling plateau, while Hahajima has steep ridges and Mukojima is mostly flat.

The Volcano or Kazan islands lie south of the Bonin Islands. Iwo Jima is the largest of the Volcano Islands. The others are Kita Iwo Jima, Minami Iwo Jima, and Nishinoshima. Iwo Jima and Kita Iwo Jima are inhabited. Nishinoshima is volcanically active.

The Bonin and Volcano islands are the central portion of the Izu–Bonin–Mariana Arc, an island arc created by the subduction of the Pacific Plate under the Philippine Sea Plate that stretches 2800 km.

== Flora ==
Flora has evolved differently on each of the islands. The Ogasawara Islands are sometimes referred to as the Galápagos of the Orient.

The endemic palm Clinostigma savoryanum is the northernmost species of the palm genus Clinostigma. Metrosideros boninensis is an endemic tree of genus Metrosideros, a common tree in the southern tropical Pacific but generally absent from Micronesia.

The islands are home to about 500 plant species, of which 43% are endemic.

There are three main types of forest on the islands:

- Type I: Elaeocarpus-Ardisia is a mesic forest found moist lowland areas with deep soils. The forests have a closed canopy with a height of about 15 m (49 ft), dominated by Ardisia sieboldii. Elaeocarpus photiniifolius, Pisonia umbellifera, and Planchonella obovata are other important canopy species. These forests were almost completely destroyed by clearing for agriculture before 1945.
- Type II: Distylium-Rhaphiolepis-Schima dry forest is found in drier lowland and upland sites with shallower soils. It is also a closed-canopy forest, with a 4-to-8 m (13-to-26 ft) canopy composed mostly of Distylium lepidotum, Rhaphiolepis integerrima, Schima mertensiana, Planchonella obovata, and Syzygium buxifolium. The Type II forests are of two sub-types:
  - Type IIa: Distylium-Schima dry forest occurs in cloudy upland areas with fine-textured soils. Pandanus boninensis and Syzygium buxifolium as the predominant trees, and these forests contain many rare and endemic species.
  - Type IIb: Rhaphiolepis-Livistona dry forest is found in drier upland areas with rocky soils. Rhaphiolepis integerrima is the dominant tree species, along with the fan palm Livistona boninensis, Pandanus boninensis and Ochrosia nakaiana.
- Type III: Distylium-Planchonella scrub forest is found on windy and dry mountain ridges and exposed sea cliffs. These forests have the highest species diversity on the islands. Distylium lepidotum and Planchonella obovata are the dominant species, growing from 0.5 to 1.5 m (1.6 to 4.9 ft) tall. Other common shrubs are Myrsine okabeana, Symplocos kawakamii, and Pittosporum parvifolium.

== Fauna ==
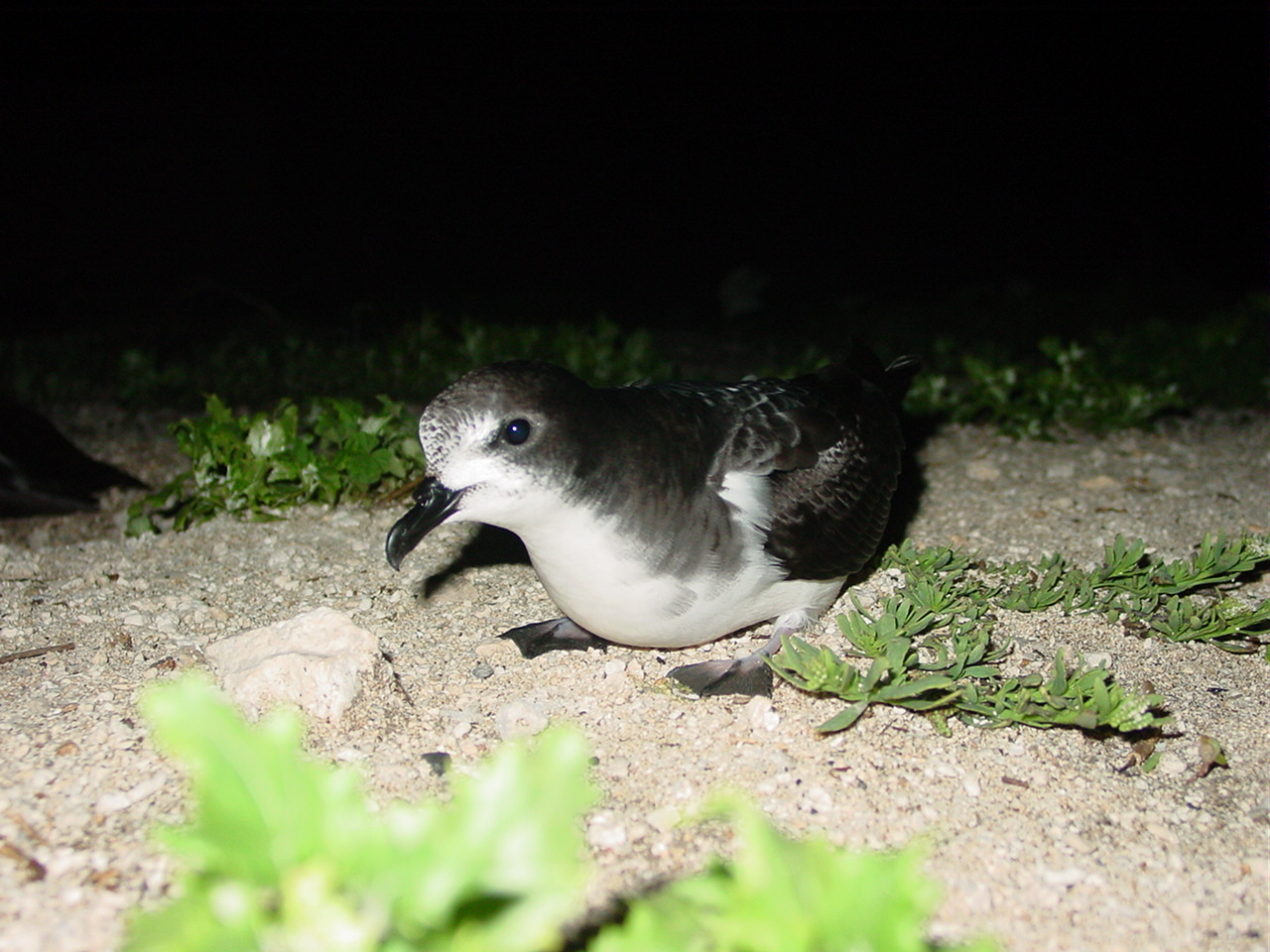
A Bonin petrel

There are 236 species of birds in the islands. The near-threatened Bonin white-eye (Apalopteron familiare), formerly known as "Bonin honeyeater", is endemic to islands. The Japanese wood pigeon (Columba janthina), which inhabits the ecoregion along with the Nansei Islands, was extirpated from the Volcano Islands in the 1980s. Matsudaira's storm-petrel (Oceanodroma matsudairae) and Bryan's shearwater (Puffinus bryani) are breeding endemics. The Bonin petrel (Pterodroma hypoleuca) ranges across the islands in the northern Pacific region from the East China Sea to Hawaii, but breeds only in the Ogasawara Islands and the western Hawaiian Islands. The Bonin pigeon (Columba versicolor) and Bonin thrush (Zoothera terrestris) are extinct.

A small bat, Sturdee's pipistrelle, is only known in one record and has not been seen since 1915. The Bonin flying fox (Pteropus pselaphon), also called the Bonin fruit bat, is endemic to the islands. It is currently listed as Endangered, and a survey published by the Ogasawara Office of Education in 1999 estimated their number to be around 100.

There are two terrestrial reptiles on the islands, the endemic Ogasawara snake-eyed skink (Cryptoblepharus nigropunctatus) and Micronesian gecko (Perochirus ateles).

The islands have 134 species of land snails, including 100 endemic species. Land snails on several islands have been decimated by the introduced New Guinea flatworm (Platydemus manokwari).

A species of Ischnura damselfly, Ischnura ezoin is known from these islands, and is endemic.

== Freshwater ==
The islands are home to 40 species of freshwater fish, including an endemic goby, Rhinogobius ogasawaraensis. There are two endemic species of caddisflies (Trichoptera). Goera ogasawaraensis inhabits headwater streams on Chichijima, and Hydroptila ogasawaraensis is found in streams on Chichijima and Hahajima. The islands have nine species of freshwater and brackish-water shrimps – three of the family Palaemonidae, five of the family Atyidae, and one of genus Metabetaeus. The brackish-water shrimp Palaemon ogasawaraensis from Chichijima is endemic, as is Paratya boninensis, a freshwater shrimp found in headwater streams on Chichijima and Hahajima. There are endemic species of mitten crab (Eriocheir ogasawaraensis), sesarmid crab (Chiromantes magnus), and fiddler crab (Uca boninensis), and the freshwater snail Stenomelania boninensis.

== Protected areas ==
A 2017 assessment found that 73 km^{2}, or 73%, of the ecoregion is in protected areas. Ogasawara National Park, established in 1972, is the largest protected area. In 2011, the Ogasawara Islands were designated a UNESCO World Heritage Site.
