= Metrosideros humboldtiana =

Conservation status
- Endangered (IUCN 3.1)

Scientific classification
- Kingdom: Plantae
- Clade: Tracheophytes
- Clade: Angiosperms
- Clade: Eudicots
- Clade: Rosids
- Order: Myrtales
- Family: Myrtaceae
- Genus: Metrosideros
- Species: M. humboldtiana

Binomial name
- Metrosideros humboldtiana Guillaumin

Species of flowering plant

Metrosideros humboldtiana is a species of plant in the family Myrtaceae. It is endemic to New Caledonia.
