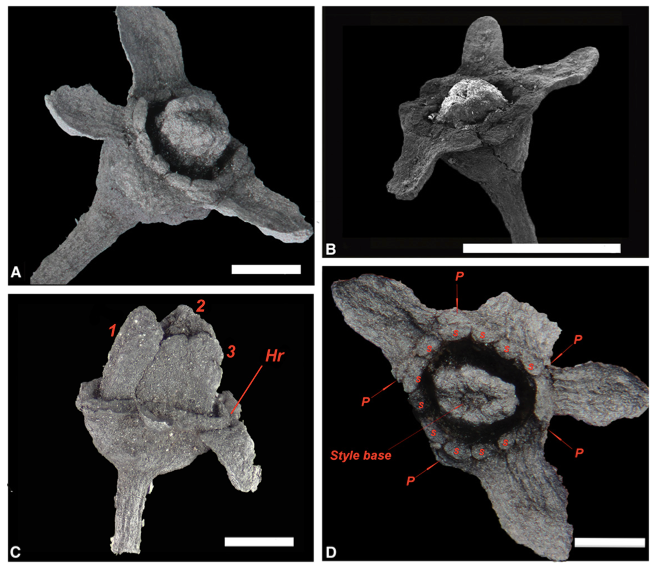
- M. leunigii, fossil flowers and fruits.

Scientific classification
- Kingdom: Plantae
- Clade: Tracheophytes
- Clade: Angiosperms
- Clade: Eudicots
- Clade: Rosids
- Order: Myrtales
- Family: Myrtaceae
- Genus: Metrosideros
- Species: †M. leunigii

Binomial name
- †Metrosideros leunigii Myall Tarran, Peter G. Wilson and Robert S. Hill

= Metrosideros leunigii =

Metrosideros leunigii Temporal range: Eocene-Oligocene

Species of flowering plant

Metrosideros leunigii is the oldest described fossil species of the flowering plant genus Metrosideros (Family Myrtaceae), named from fossil flowers and fruits uncovered from the Oligocene (approx. 30 Million years) aged Little Rapid River deposit in Tasmania, Australia, as well as leaves from this deposit and identical leaves from the Eocene aged Hasties deposit, also in Tasmania. These fossils are significant, because they show that Metrosideros once occurred naturally in Australia during the Cenozoic, and has since become extinct.

Prior to the discovery of these fossils, there has been no record of the genus Metrosideros in Australia. The absence of Metrosideros in Australia has been considered something of a mystery to Australian paleobotanists, since Metrosideros is one of the most widely spread flowering plant genera in the Pacific, growing from the sub-Antarctic Auckland Islands of New Zealand to the Bonin Islands near Japan and to Hawaii, owing to the lightweight seeds of at least some species of Metrosideros which can be dispersed easily by wind, and survive long periods of submersion in sea water.

It had been hypothesized that Metrosideros may have evolved in New Zealand, and subsequently dispersed throughout the Pacific from there. However, these fossils may suggest an Australian origin for the genus. Why and when Metrosideros should have become extinct in Australia, yet survived elsewhere in the Pacific is unknown.

The species Metrosideros leunigii was named after Australian cartoonist, Michael Leunig.
