= Metrosideros ochrantha =

Conservation status
- Critically Endangered (IUCN 3.1)

Scientific classification
- Kingdom: Plantae
- Clade: Tracheophytes
- Clade: Angiosperms
- Clade: Eudicots
- Clade: Rosids
- Order: Myrtales
- Family: Myrtaceae
- Genus: Metrosideros
- Species: M. ochrantha

Binomial name
- Metrosideros ochrantha A.C.Sm.

Species of tree

Metrosideros ochrantha is a species of plant in the family Myrtaceae.

This small tree is endemic to Fiji and is restricted to Mt Kasi and its vicinity on Vanua Levu. It occurs in dense low forest between 300 and 430 m.

== Sources ==
- Europeana: Europe's cultural collections. Listing for Metrosideros ochrantha A.C.Sm. Accessed 5 November 2012.
