= Metrosideros elegans =

Conservation status
- Near Threatened (IUCN 3.1)

Scientific classification
- Kingdom: Plantae
- Clade: Tracheophytes
- Clade: Angiosperms
- Clade: Eudicots
- Clade: Rosids
- Order: Myrtales
- Family: Myrtaceae
- Genus: Metrosideros
- Species: M. elegans

Binomial name
- Metrosideros elegans (Montrouz.) Beauvis.

Synonyms
- Carpolepis elegans (Montrouz.) JWDawson; Ballardia elegans Montrouz.

Species of tree

Metrosideros elegans is a species of flowering plant endemic to New Caledonia in the family Myrtaceae. The tree has yellow flowers and grows most commonly between about 300 and 1,500 metres elevation in forest or shrubland. It is sometimes epiphyte at first.

== Cultivars ==
There are no known cultivars of M. elegans available, and the plant is not widely available in plant nurseries.
