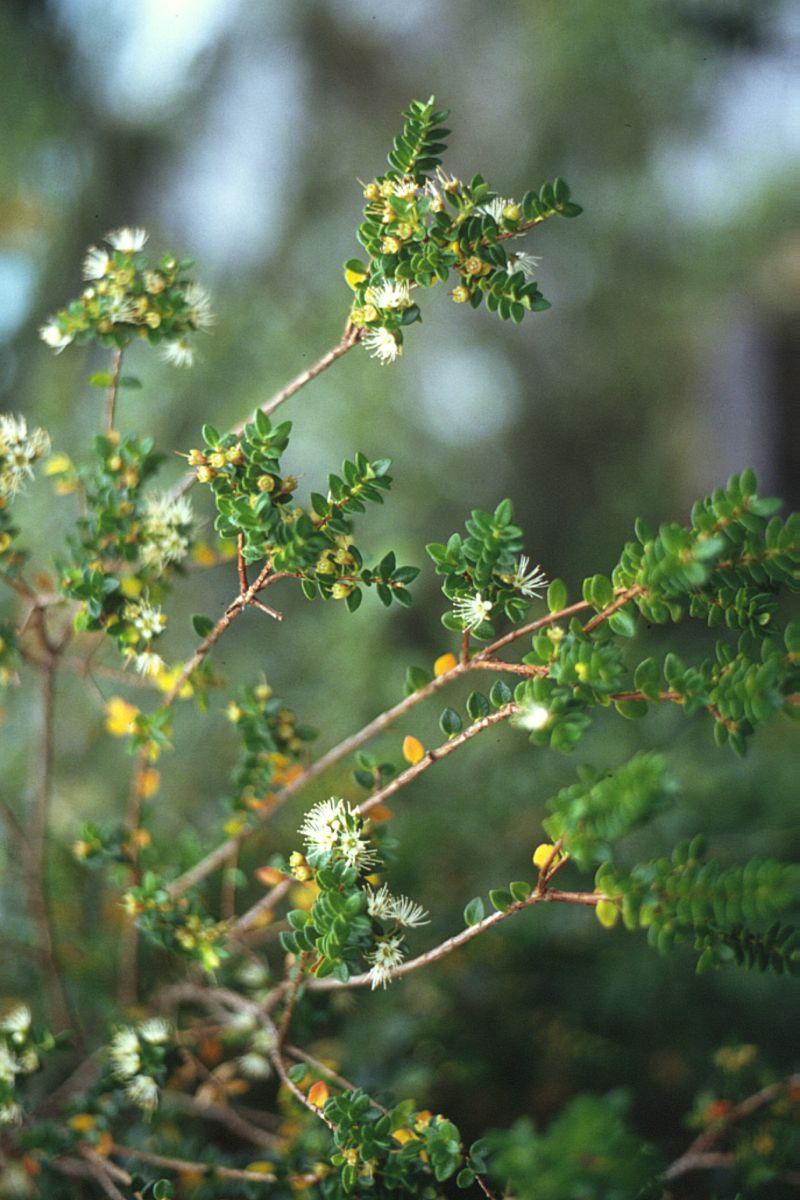
- Tepú in flower

Conservation status
- Least Concern (IUCN 3.1)

Scientific classification
- Kingdom: Plantae
- Clade: Tracheophytes
- Clade: Angiosperms
- Clade: Eudicots
- Clade: Rosids
- Order: Myrtales
- Family: Myrtaceae
- Genus: Metrosideros
- Species: M. stipularis

Binomial name
- Metrosideros stipularis (Hook. & Arn.) Hook.f.

Synonyms
- Myrtus stipularis Hook. & Arn.; Nania stipularis (Hook. & Arn.) Kuntze; Tepualia patagonica Phil.; Tepualia philippiana Griseb.; Tepualia philippii Griseb. ex Phil.; Tepualia stipularis (Hook. & Arn.) Griseb.; Tepualia stipularis var. patagonica (Phil.) Reiche; Tepualia stipularis var. philippiana (Griseb.) Speg.

= Metrosideros stipularis =

Tepú

Species of shrub

Metrosideros stipularis is a species of the myrtle family commonly known as tepú, trepú, or tepual. It is an evergreen tree or shrub that attains heights of about four to five metres. The plant is native to southern South America in the southern portions of Chile and Argentina and is a typical resident of very wet areas, especially in swamps and peat bogs and with gleyic soil horizons. Tepú has white flowers that emerge during the austral summer from December through April, but more commonly from Frebruary to March. The species is shade tolerant and grows merkedly slowly, less than 1 mm per year. Mature tepú forest or tepuales have high basal areas when compared with other types of humid forests. Tepú trees tend to grow horizontally and Tepú forest tend have high biomass contents.

In some localities it grows together with Fitzroya cupressoides or with Pilgerodendron uviferum. The tepu is most abundant in the Chilean provinces of Chiloé, Llanquihue and Palena.

The tree's wood is hard and used within its range as a firewood due to it high energy content. It is commonly recommended to use its firewood mixed with wood from other species given its excessive heat content that is said to be able to break kitchen stoves.

This species has often been placed in its own genus Tepualia, but recent works include it in Metrosideros.
