= Metrosideros punctata =

Conservation status
- Least Concern (IUCN 3.1)

Scientific classification
- Kingdom: Plantae
- Clade: Tracheophytes
- Clade: Angiosperms
- Clade: Eudicots
- Clade: Rosids
- Order: Myrtales
- Family: Myrtaceae
- Genus: Metrosideros
- Species: M. punctata

Binomial name
- Metrosideros punctata J.W.Dawson

Species of flowering plant

Metrosideros punctata is a species of plant in the family Myrtaceae. It is endemic to New Caledonia. It is threatened by habitat loss. It was first described by John Dawson.
