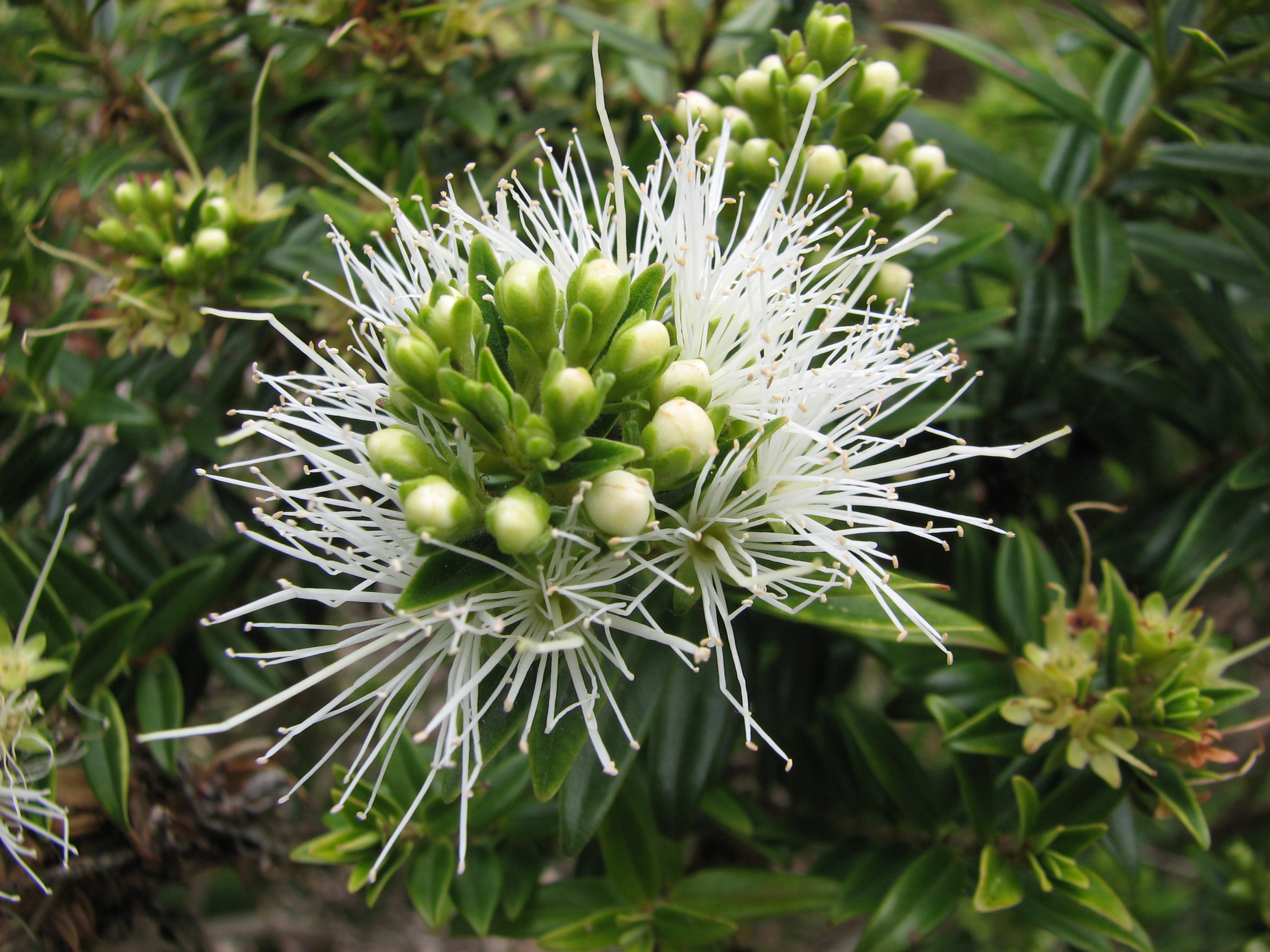

Conservation status
- Least Concern (IUCN 3.1)

Scientific classification
- Kingdom: Plantae
- Clade: Tracheophytes
- Clade: Angiosperms
- Clade: Eudicots
- Clade: Rosids
- Order: Myrtales
- Family: Myrtaceae
- Genus: Metrosideros
- Species: M. operculata

Binomial name
- Metrosideros operculata Labill.

Synonyms
- Nania operculata (Labill.) Kuntze

= Metrosideros operculata =

Species of flowering plant in the myrtle family

Metrosideros operculata is a species of flowering plant in the family Myrtaceae. It is endemic to New Caledonia. It usually grows as a shrub to 3 metres (9.8 ft) in height, or rarely as a small tree to 10 metres (33 ft). Stems are square in section and covered with silky hairs. The stiff, pointed leaves have a slightly revolute margin and are linear to elliptic in shape. They are 12 to 40 mm long and 3 to 10 mm wide. White, pink or red flowers with 3 petals and between 50 and 120 stamens are produced in axillary inflorescences.

Two varieties are currently recognised:

- M. operculata var. francii J.W.Dawson
- M. operculata Labill. var. operculata
