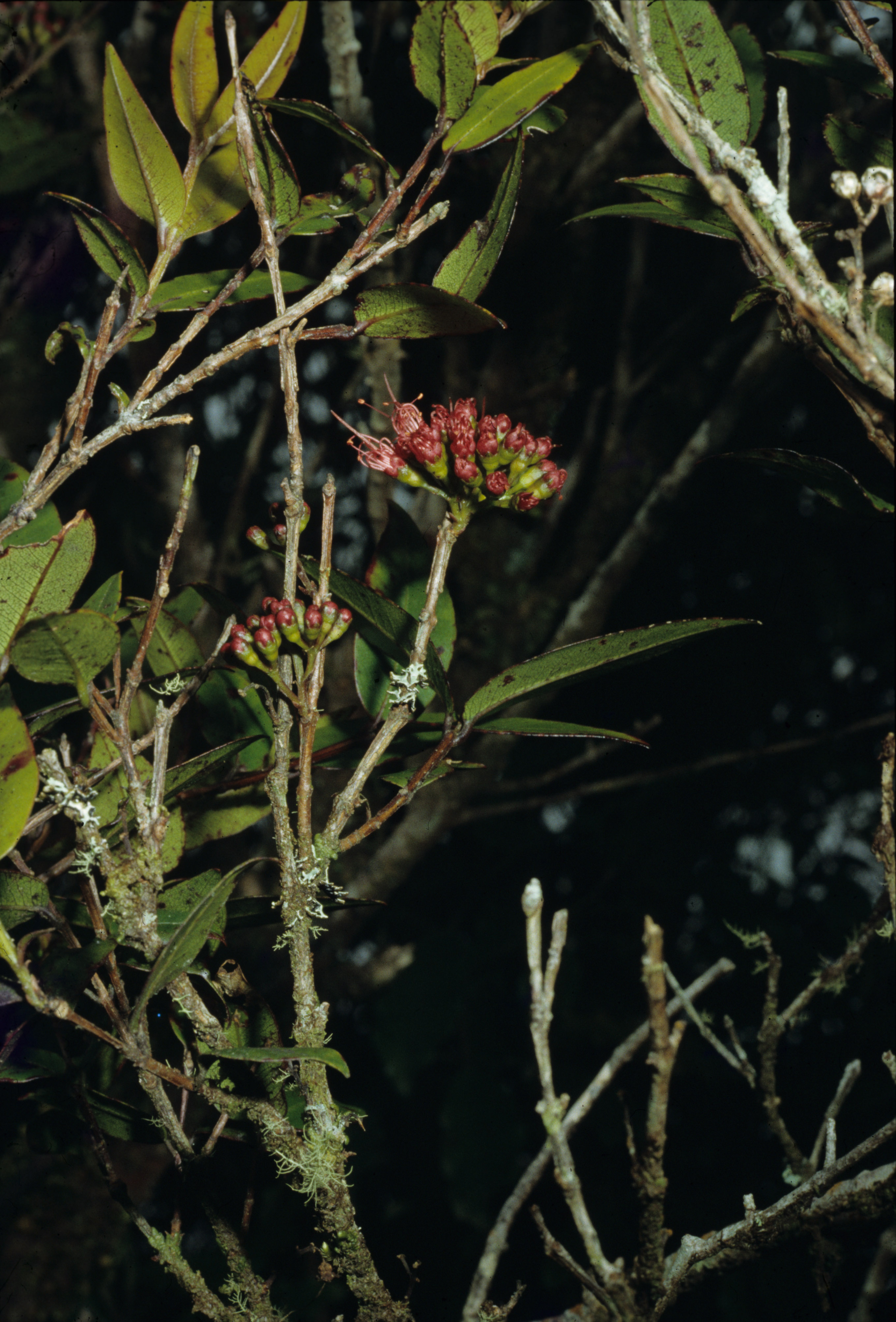

Conservation status
- Least Concern (IUCN 3.1)

Scientific classification
- Kingdom: Plantae
- Clade: Tracheophytes
- Clade: Angiosperms
- Clade: Eudicots
- Clade: Rosids
- Order: Myrtales
- Family: Myrtaceae
- Genus: Metrosideros
- Species: M. parkinsonii

Binomial name
- Metrosideros parkinsonii Buchanan

= Metrosideros parkinsonii =

Parkinson's rātā

Species of tree endemic to New Zealand

Metrosideros parkinsonii, also known as Parkinson's rātā or shrubby rātā, is a shrub or small tree endemic to New Zealand. The name commemorates Sydney Parkinson, Captain James Cook's botanical artist during his first voyage to New Zealand.

== Description ==
The flowers of M. parkinsonii are usually crimson, and flowering is usually from September until December. Foliage varies from dark green to light green, with leaves usually clasped against the branches. Flowers will often appear directly from branches, and can sometimes be hidden behind the foliage.

== Conservation ==
As of 2012, M. parkinsonii is not regarded as threatened. It naturally occurs in the West Coast of the South Island, from Hokitika to Collingwood, as well as Great Barrier and Little Barrier Islands in the Hauraki Gulf. The IUCN Red List assesses the species as Least Concern.

== Cultivation ==
Metrosideros parkinsonii is a difficult plant to establish. This species is mainly grown for its attractive flowers. Plants may need some pruning and training to achieve a good shape and it can be grown against walls or fences or as a specimen plant.

It is seldom available through nurseries but is occasionally available from Oratia Native Plant Nursery.

== See also ==
- Metrosideros excelsa, Pōhutukawa
- Metrosideros robusta, Northern rātā
- Metrosideros umbellata, Southern rātā
- Metrosideros bartlettii, Bartlett's rātā
