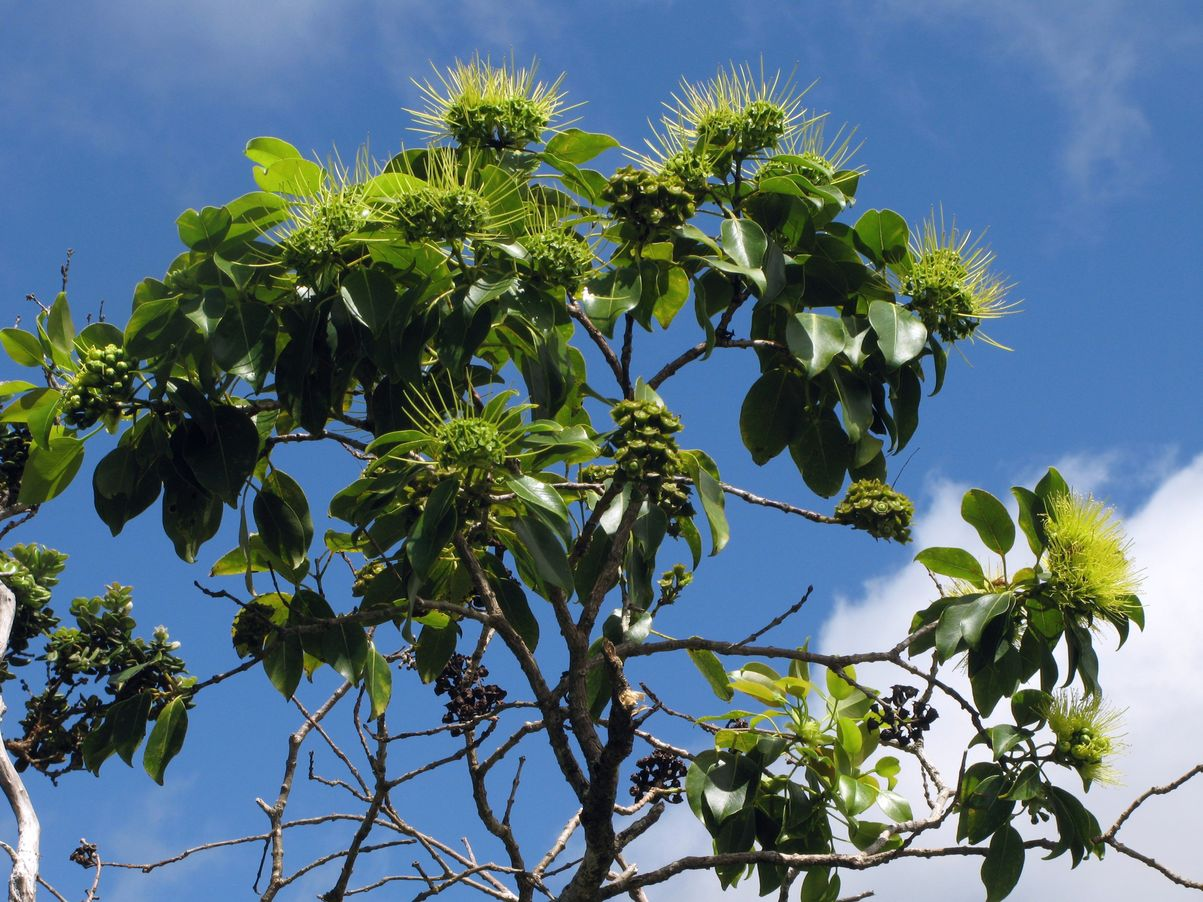

Conservation status
- Endangered (IUCN 3.1)

Scientific classification
- Kingdom: Plantae
- Clade: Tracheophytes
- Clade: Angiosperms
- Clade: Eudicots
- Clade: Rosids
- Order: Myrtales
- Family: Myrtaceae
- Genus: Metrosideros
- Species: M. macropus

Binomial name
- Metrosideros macropus Hook. & Arn.

= Metrosideros macropus =

Species of plant

Metrosideros macropus, commonly known as the lehua mamo or ʻohiʻa, is a species of tree in the eucalyptus family, Myrtaceae. It is endemic to the island of Oʻahu in the Hawaiian Islands. It is closely related to the widespread and highly variable ʻōhiʻa lehua (M. polymorpha), found throughout the islands. Lehua mamo, however, is only found in the Koʻolau mountains. It is distinguished from M. polymorpha by the elongate leaf petioles (1/3–1/2 as long as the leaf blades, compared to less than 1/4 as long in M. polymorpha) and the flowers are usually yellow. The latter character is also found in some varieties of M. polymorpha, which normally has red flowers, but occasionally the flowers of M. macropus are red as well.

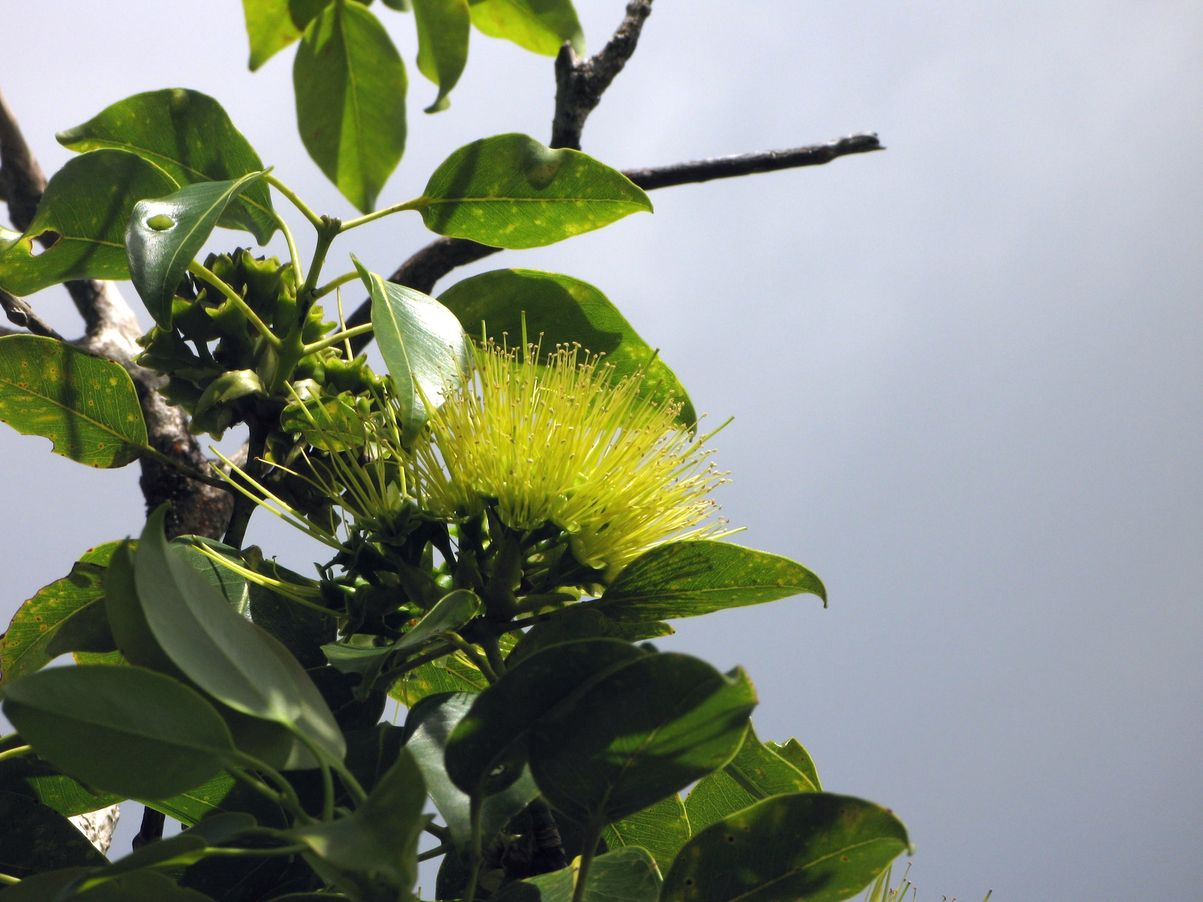
M. macropus flower. Also note the long leaf petioles.
