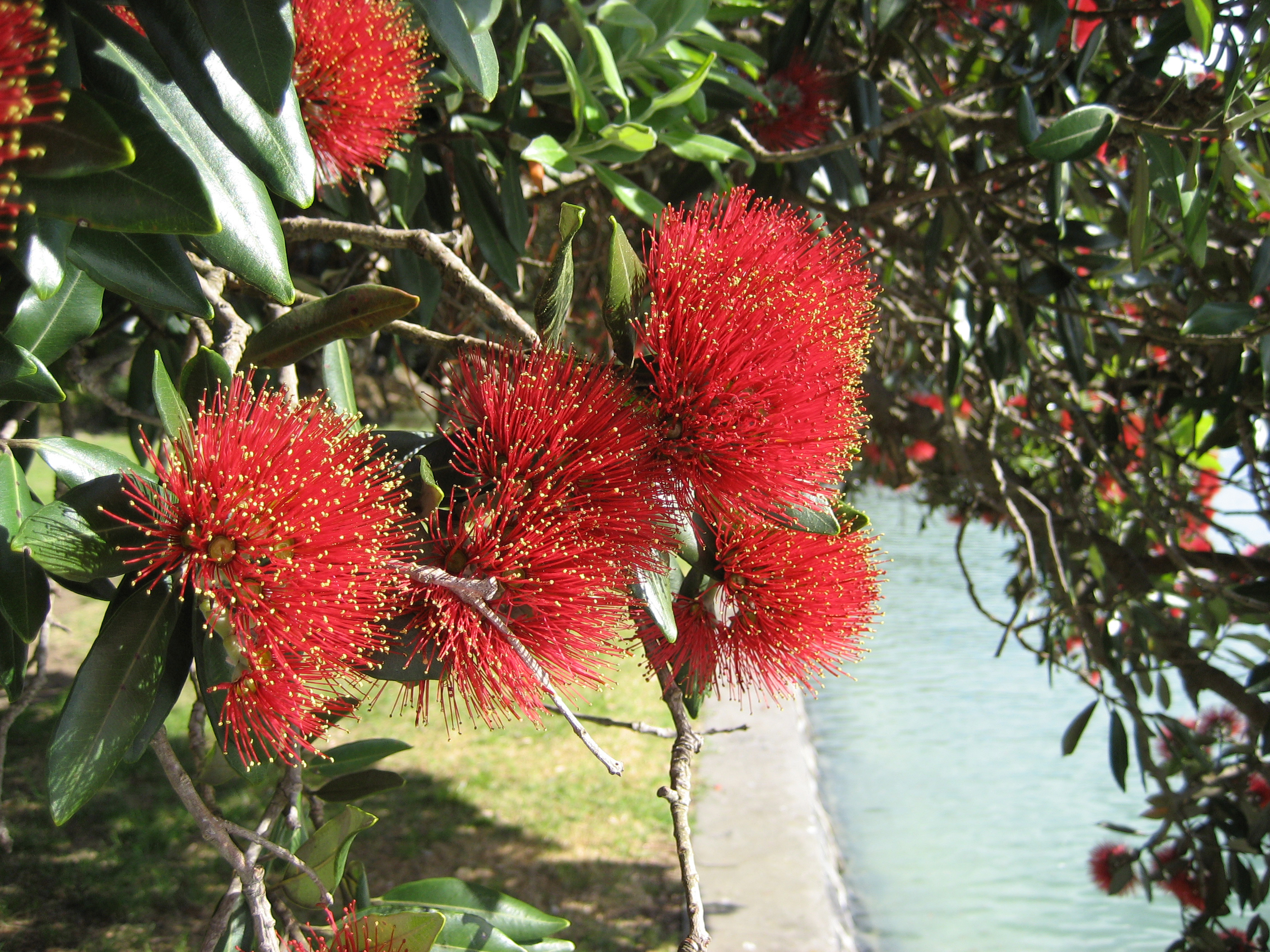
- Flowers and foliage of M. excelsa

Scientific classification
- Kingdom: Plantae
- Clade: Tracheophytes
- Clade: Angiosperms
- Clade: Eudicots
- Clade: Rosids
- Order: Myrtales
- Family: Myrtaceae
- Subfamily: Myrtoideae
- Tribe: Metrosidereae
- Genus: Metrosideros; Banks ex Gaertn.

Species
- See text

Synonyms
- Agalmanthus (Endl.) Hombr. & Jacquinot; Ballardia Montrouz.; Carpolepis (J.W.Dawson) J.W.Dawson; Mearnsia Merr.; Microsideros Baum.-Bod. nom. nival.; Tepualia Griseb.

= Metrosideros =

Genus of trees

Metrosideros (/ˌmɛtrəˈsɪdərəs, -troʊ-/; MET-roe-SID-uh-ruhs) is a genus of approximately 60 trees, shrubs, and vines in the family Myrtaceae, mostly found in the Pacific region. Most of the tree forms are small, but some are exceptionally large, the New Zealand species in particular. The name derives from the Ancient Greek metra or "heartwood" and sideron or "iron". Perhaps the best-known species are the pōhutukawa (M. excelsa), northern rātā (M. robusta) and southern rātā (M. umbellata) of New Zealand, and ʻōhiʻa lehua (M. polymorpha) from the Hawaiian Islands.

== Distribution ==
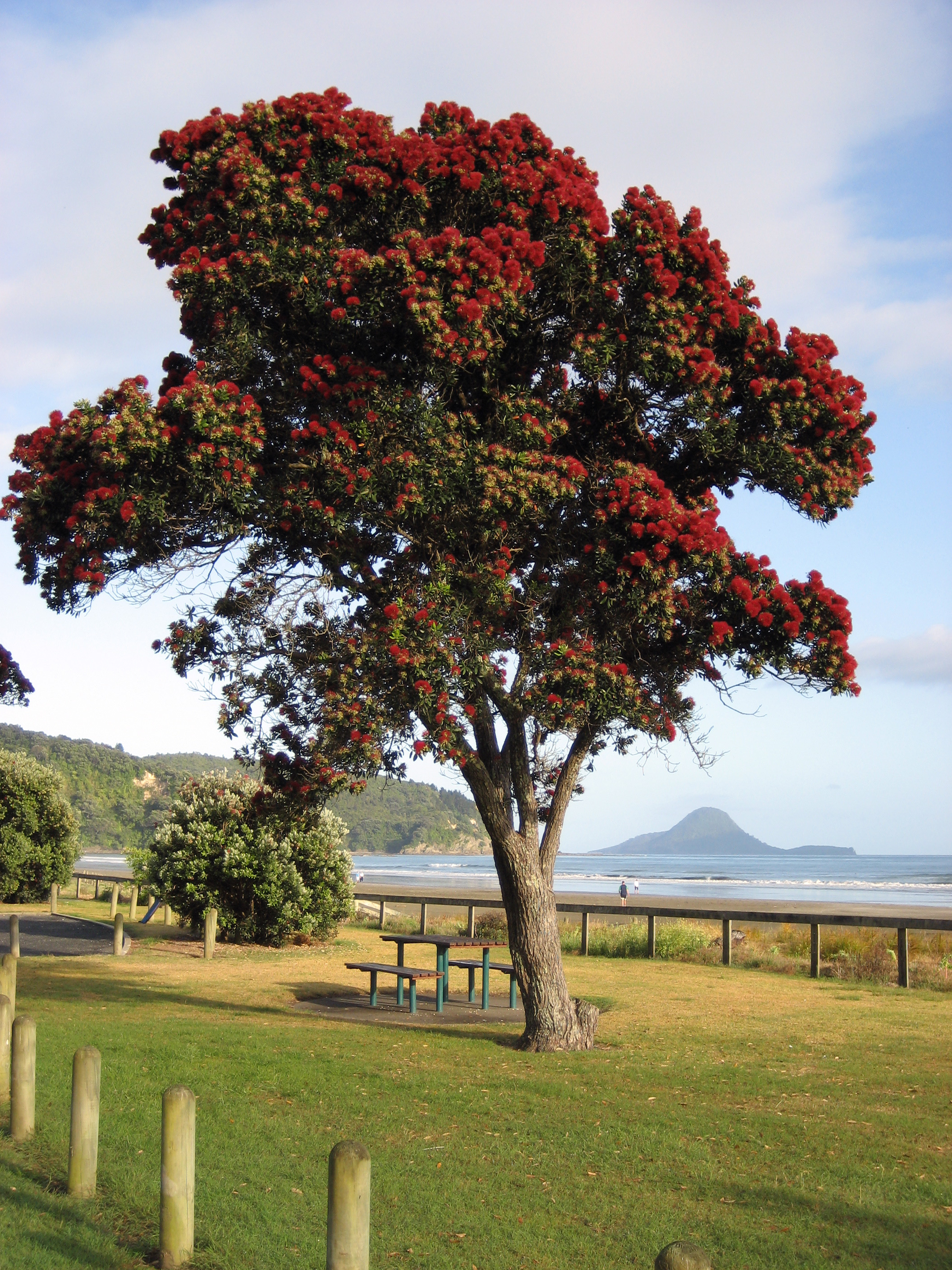
A young pōhutukawa (M. excelsa) in flower at Ōhope, in the Bay of Plenty, New Zealand

Metrosideros is one of the most widely spread flowering plant genera in the Pacific. New Caledonia has 21 species, New Zealand has 12, New Guinea has seven and Hawaii has 5. The genus is present on most other high Pacific Islands, including Solomon Islands, Vanuatu, Fiji, Samoa, Cook Islands, French Polynesia, Bonin Islands and Lord Howe Island, but absent from Micronesia. The genus is also represented by one species in the Philippines, one in South America (Chile and Argentina), and one outlier in South Africa.

Metrosideros seeds are very lightweight and easily dispersed by wind. The seeds can also survive freezing temperatures, and up to 30 days submerged in salt water, and still germinate, which probably accounts for their wide distribution. They are often found as pioneer trees on lava flows and on mountain ridges. Despite the clear propensity towards long-distance dispersal, the genus does not occur in mainland Australia.

== Fossil record ==
For some time, it had been hypothesised that Metrosideros evolved in New Zealand, and dispersed from there throughout the Pacific. This was due to the long fossil record of Metrosideros in New Zealand coupled with the absence of any Metrosideros fossils on other Gondwanan landmasses. The oldest conclusive fossil evidence of Metrosideros in New Zealand is fossil fruits from the Miocene aged Manuherikia sediments of Central Otago. There is a fossil pollen record going back much further, but it has been shown that Metrosideros pollen is very similar morphologically to many other genera within the family Myrtaceae and as such, fossil pollen cannot be reliably used as the oldest record of the genus.

The oldest conclusive record of Metrosideros are fossil fruits and flowers of Metrosideros leunigii, an extinct species, from Oligocene aged sediments in Tasmania, Australia. This is very curious considering that Metrosideros is one of the most widely spread plants in the Pacific, and is not present in Australia today. These fossils may also point towards an Australian origin for the genus.

== Cultivation ==
Metrosideros are often cultivated for their showy flowers, as street trees or in home gardens. The flowers are generally red, but some cultivars have orange, yellow or white flowers. Some names listed in horticultural catalogues and other publications, such as M. villosa and M. vitiensis, are actually the names of varieties or cultivars (usually of M. collina) rather than valid scientific species. The pōhutukawa of New Zealand has several cultivars grown in Australia, Hawaii and California. It has been planted successfully in the north of Spain and on the Scilly Isles off the south-west coast of Britain, but the species is considered an invasive pest in parts of South Africa and in the Azores. Metrosideros kermadecensis is recently naturalised in Hawaii, and has the potential to become a pest. In turn, various cultivars of M. collina and M. polymorpha are widely grown in New Zealand under various names. Metrosideros umbellata occurs naturally south of mainland New Zealand in the Auckland Islands at 50° South latitude, and is the hardiest member of the genus, and a few cultivated specimens are growing in Scotland.

== Metrosideros species ==
New Caledonia

- Metrosideros brevistylis J.W. Dawson
- Metrosideros cacuminum J.W. Dawson
- Metrosideros cherrieri J.W. Dawson
- Metrosideros dolichandra Schltr.
- Metrosideros elegans (Montrouz.) Beauvis.
- Metrosideros engleriana Schltr.
- Metrosideros humboldtiana Guillaumin
- Metrosideros laurifolia Brongn. & Gris
- Metrosideros longipetiolata J.W.Dawson
- Metrosideros microphylla (Schltr.) J.W.Dawson
- Metrosideros nitida Brongn. & Gris
- Metrosideros operculata Labill.
- Metrosideros oreomyrtus Däniker
- Metrosideros paniensis J.W.Dawson
- Metrosideros patens J.W.Dawson
- Metrosideros porphyrea Schltr.
- Metrosideros punctata J.W.Dawson
- Metrosideros rotundifolia J.W.Dawson
- Metrosideros tardiflora (J.W.Dawson) Pillon
- Metrosideros tetrasticha Guillaumin
- Metrosideros whitakeri J.W.Dawson

South America

- Metrosideros stipularis (Hook. & Arn.) Hook.f.

South Africa

- Metrosideros angustifolia (L.) Sm.

New Zealand

- Metrosideros albiflora Sol. ex Gartn. – large white rātā
- Metrosideros bartlettii J.W.Dawson – Bartlett's rātā
- Metrosideros carminea W.R.B.Oliv. – carmine rātā
- Metrosideros colensoi Hook.f. – Colenso's rātā
- Metrosideros diffusa (G.Forst.)Sm. – white rātā
- Metrosideros excelsa Sol. ex Gaertn. – pōhutukawa
- Metrosideros fulgens Sol. ex Gaertn. – scarlet rātā
- Metrosideros kermadecensis W.R.B.Oliver – Kermadec pōhutukawa (Kermadec Islands)
- Metrosideros parkinsonii Buchanan – Parkinson's rātā
- Metrosideros perforata (J.R.Forst. & G.Forst.) Druce – small white rātā
- Metrosideros robusta A.Cunn. – northern rātā
- Metrosideros umbellata Cav. – southern rātā

New Guinea

- Metrosideros arfakensis Gibbs
- Metrosideros cordata (C.T.White & W.D.Francis) J.W.Dawson
- Metrosideros ovata (C.T.White) J.W.Dawson
- Metrosideros parallelinervis C.T.White
- Metrosideros ramiflora Lauterb.
- Metrosideros regelii F.Muell.
- Metrosideros whiteana J.W.Dawson

Philippines

- Metrosideros halconensis (Merr.) J.W. Dawson

Hawaii

- Metrosideros macropus Hook. & Arn. – lehua mamo (Oʻahu)
- Metrosideros polymorpha Gaudich. – ʻōhiʻa lehua
- Metrosideros rugosa A.Gray – lehua papa (Oʻahu)
- Metrosideros tremuloides (A.Heller) Rock – lehua ʻāhihi (Oʻahu)
- Metrosideros waialealae (Rock) Rock (Kauaʻi, Molokaʻi, and Maui)

French Polynesia, Pitcairn and the Cook Islands

- Metrosideros collina (J.R.Forst. & G.Forst.) A.Gray

Fiji, Samoa and Vanuatu

- Metrosideros gregoryi Christoph. (Samoa)
- Metrosideros ochrantha A.C.Sm. (Fiji)
- Metrosideros tabwemasanaensis Pillon (Vanuatu)
- Metrosideros vitiensis (A.Gray) Pillon

Solomon Islands

- Metrosideros salomonensis C.T.White
- Metrosideros tetragyna J.W.Dawson

Lord Howe Island

- Metrosideros nervulosa C.Moore & F. Muell. – mountain rose
- Metrosideros sclerocarpa J.W.Dawson

Ogasawara Islands

- Metrosideros boninensis (Hayata ex Koidz.) Tuyama
