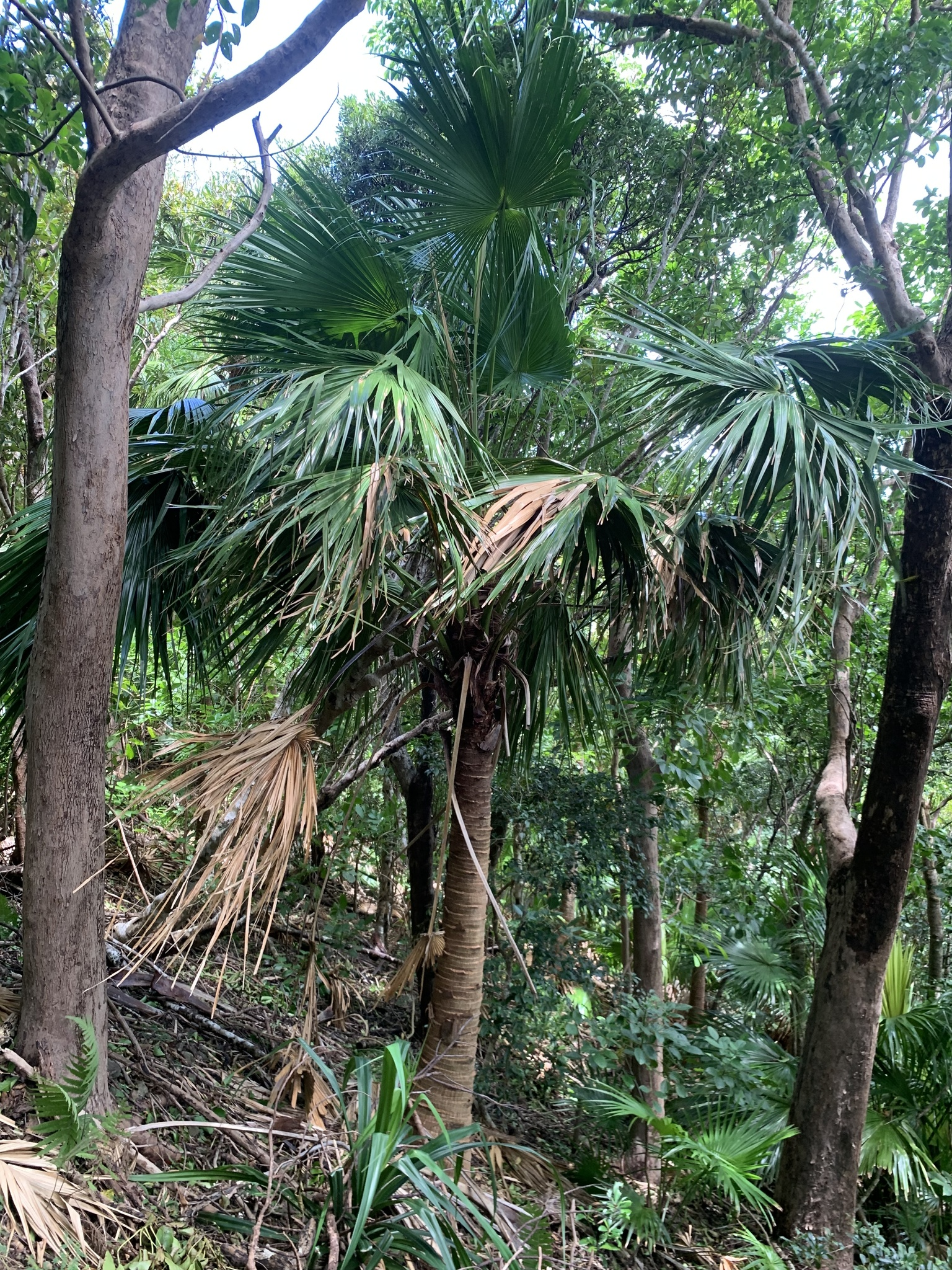

Scientific classification
- Kingdom: Plantae
- Clade: Tracheophytes
- Clade: Angiosperms
- Clade: Monocots
- Clade: Commelinids
- Order: Arecales
- Family: Arecaceae
- Tribe: Trachycarpeae
- Genus: Livistona
- Species: L. boninensis

Binomial name
- Livistona boninensis (Becc.) Nakai

Synonyms
- Livistona chinensis var. boninensis Becc.

= Livistona boninensis =

Species of palm

Livistona boninensis is a species of flowering plant in the palm family Arecaceae, native to the Bonin Islands of Japan. It has been introduced into the Volcano Islands, also Japanese.

== Description ==
A solitary, hermaphroditic palm with a tall, slender trunk reaching up to 20 m in height and about 30 cm in diameter at breast height. The trunk features raised leaf scars with remnant fibers, narrow internodes, and lacks persistent petiole stubs. It forms a crown of 40-60 leaves that are costapalmate, subcircular, and 120-200 cm long, with a grey-green upper surface and a lighter underside. The leaves are divided 45-75% of their length into 50-82 segments, with pendulous apical lobes and distinct parallel and transverse veins.

The inflorescence, 130-220 cm long, remains within the crown and is branched up to three orders. It consists of 6-7 partial inflorescences with glabrous rachillae measuring 4-16 cm. Flowers are cream-colored, clustered in groups of 5-8, and measure 2.0-2.8 mm in length. The fruit is glossy, bright green, and varies from globose to pear-saped, measuring 19-30 mm long and 14-28 mm in diameter, with a short pedicel of 3-4 mm. The seed is reniform.
