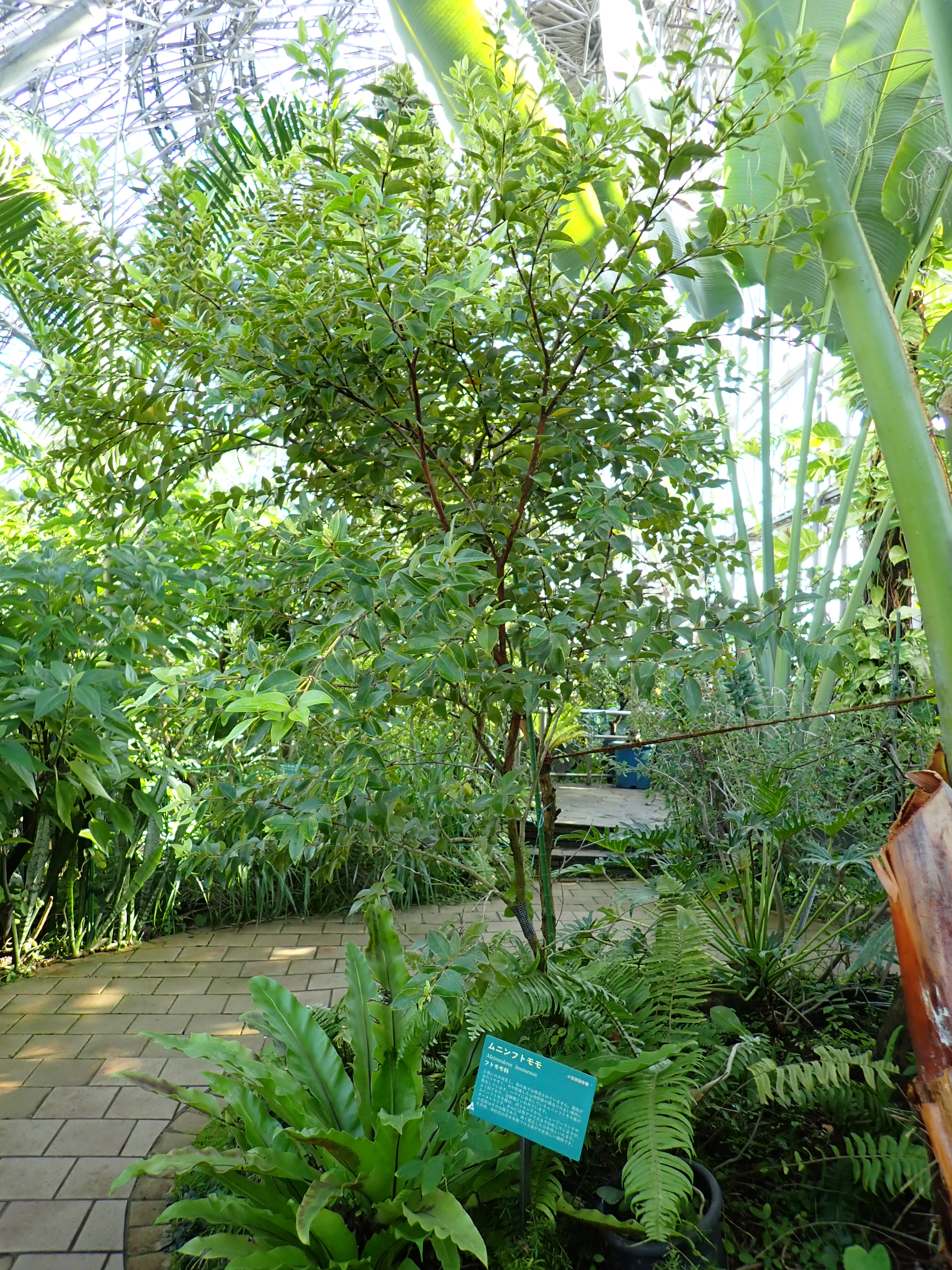

Scientific classification
- Kingdom: Plantae
- Clade: Tracheophytes
- Clade: Angiosperms
- Clade: Eudicots
- Clade: Rosids
- Order: Myrtales
- Family: Myrtaceae
- Genus: Metrosideros
- Species: M. boninensis

Binomial name
- Metrosideros boninensis (Hayata ex Koidz.) Tuyama

Synonyms
- Eugenia boninensis Hayata ex Koidz.

= Metrosideros boninensis =

Species of flowering plant

Metrosideros boninensis is a species of flowering plant in the family Myrtaceae. It is endemic to the Bonin Islands archipelago and is found exclusively on Chichijima Island, excepting for two remaining trees located on neighboring Anijima Island. M. boninensis is classified as 'endangered' in the Japanese Red Data Book and, although there were 326 plants recorded in 2004, genetic diversity of M. boninensis is extremely low. It is the northernmost species of the Metrosideros genus.

== Taxonomy ==
The species was first formally described by botanist Bunzō Hayata in 1918, as Eugenia boninensis. This was corrected to M. boninensis in 1938 by Takasi Tuyama.

== Cultivars ==
There are no known cultivars of M. boninensis available, and the plant is not widely available in plant nurseries.
