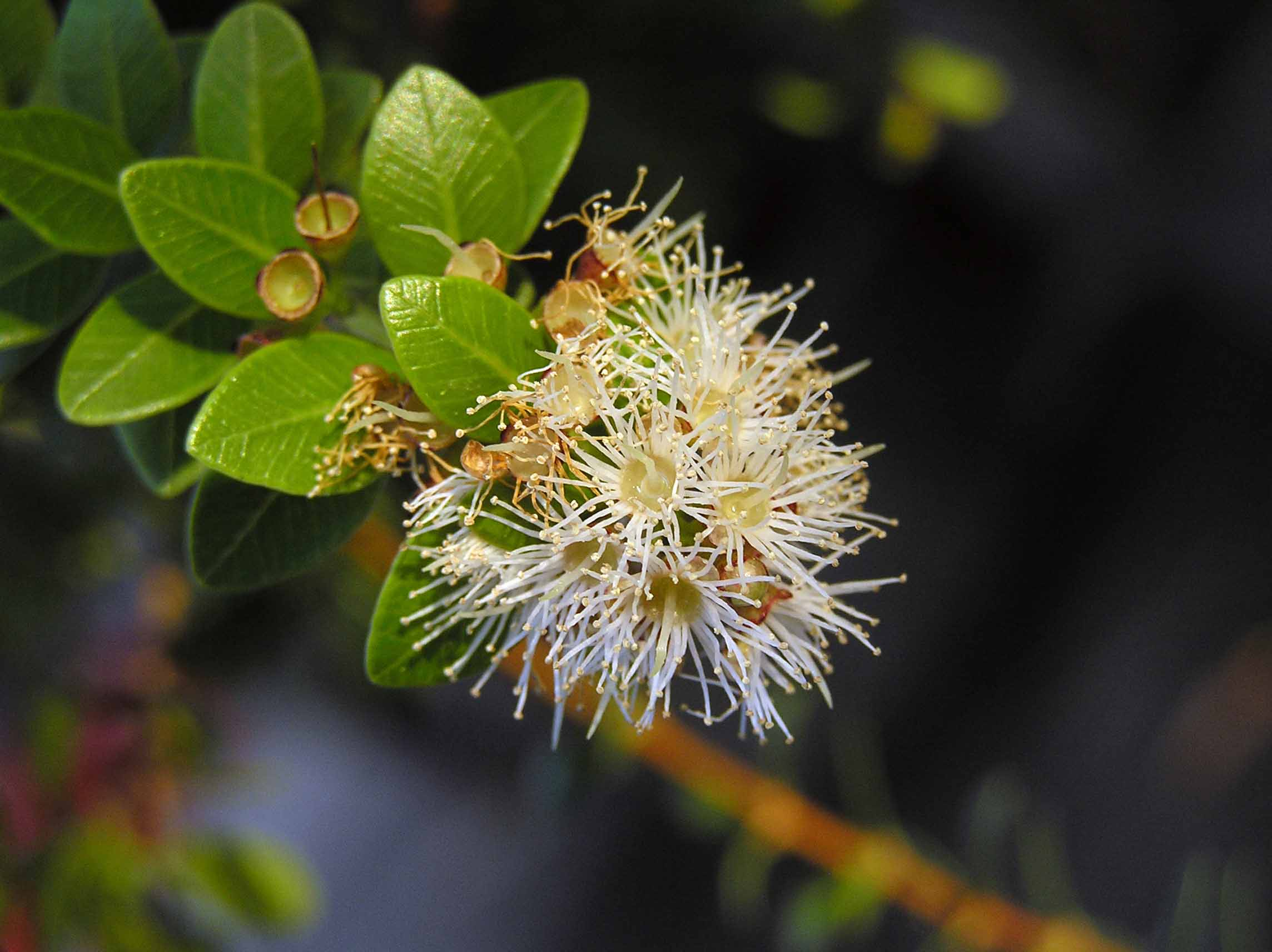
- Close-up of flowers
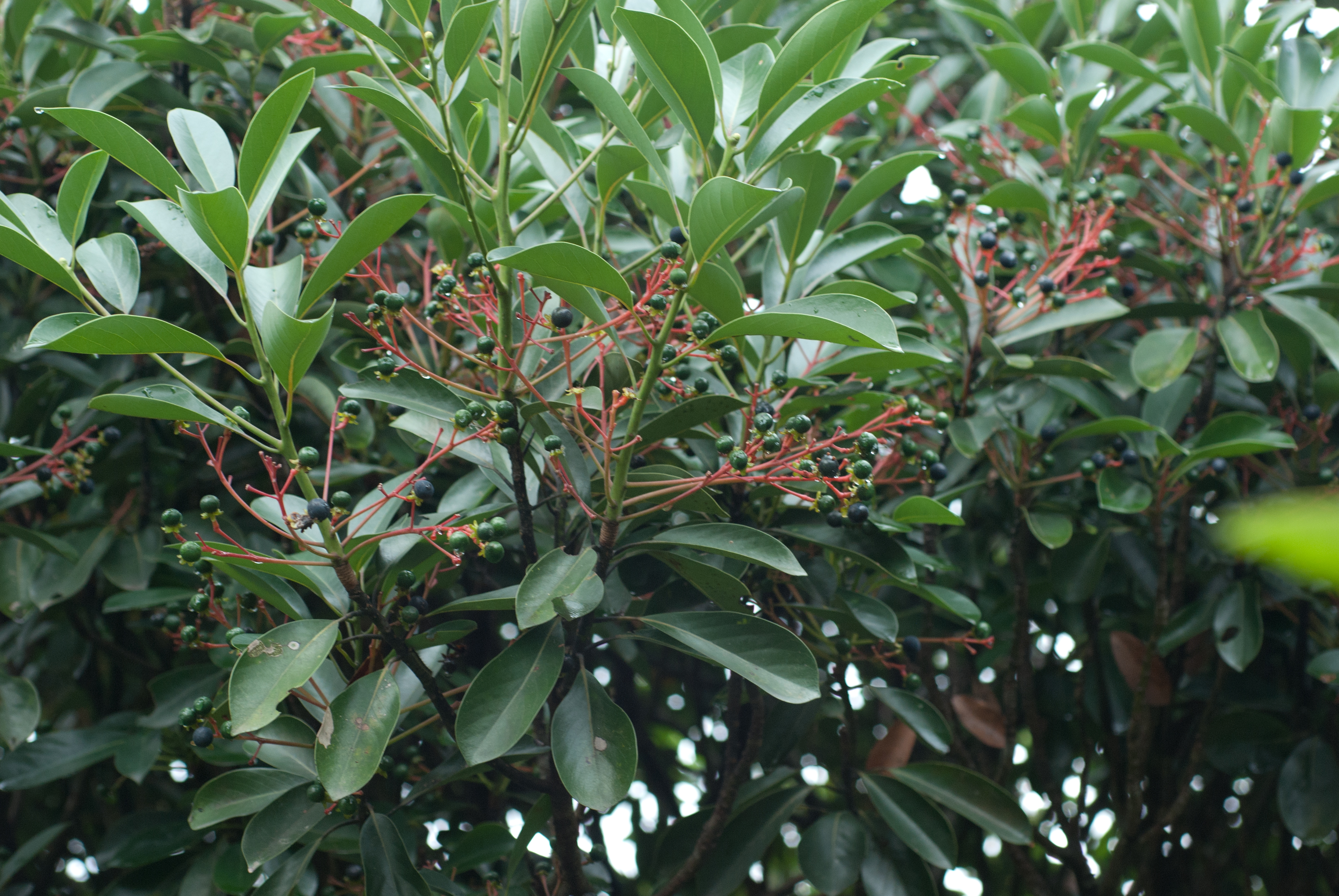
- In fruit

Scientific classification
- Kingdom: Plantae
- Clade: Tracheophytes
- Clade: Angiosperms
- Clade: Eudicots
- Clade: Rosids
- Order: Myrtales
- Family: Myrtaceae
- Genus: Syzygium
- Species: S. buxifolium

Binomial name
- Syzygium buxifolium Hook. & Arn.

Synonyms
- List: Eugenia microphylla C.Abel; Eugenia pyxophylla Hance; Eugenia sinensis Hemsl.; Eugenia somae Hayata; Syllysium buxifolium (Hook. & Arn.) Meyen & S.Schauer; Syzygium buxifolium var. verticillatum C.Chen; Syzygium somae (Hayata) Mori

= Syzygium buxifolium =

Species of plant in the myrtle family

Syzygium buxifolium, the boxleaf eugenia or fish-scale bush, is a species of flowering plant in the family Myrtaceae, native to northern Vietnam, southern China, Hainan, Taiwan, the Ryukyu Islands, and southern Kyushu, Japan. A shrub or small tree, it is suitable for hedges, containers, and bonsai. It is used as a street tree in a number of southern Chinese cities.

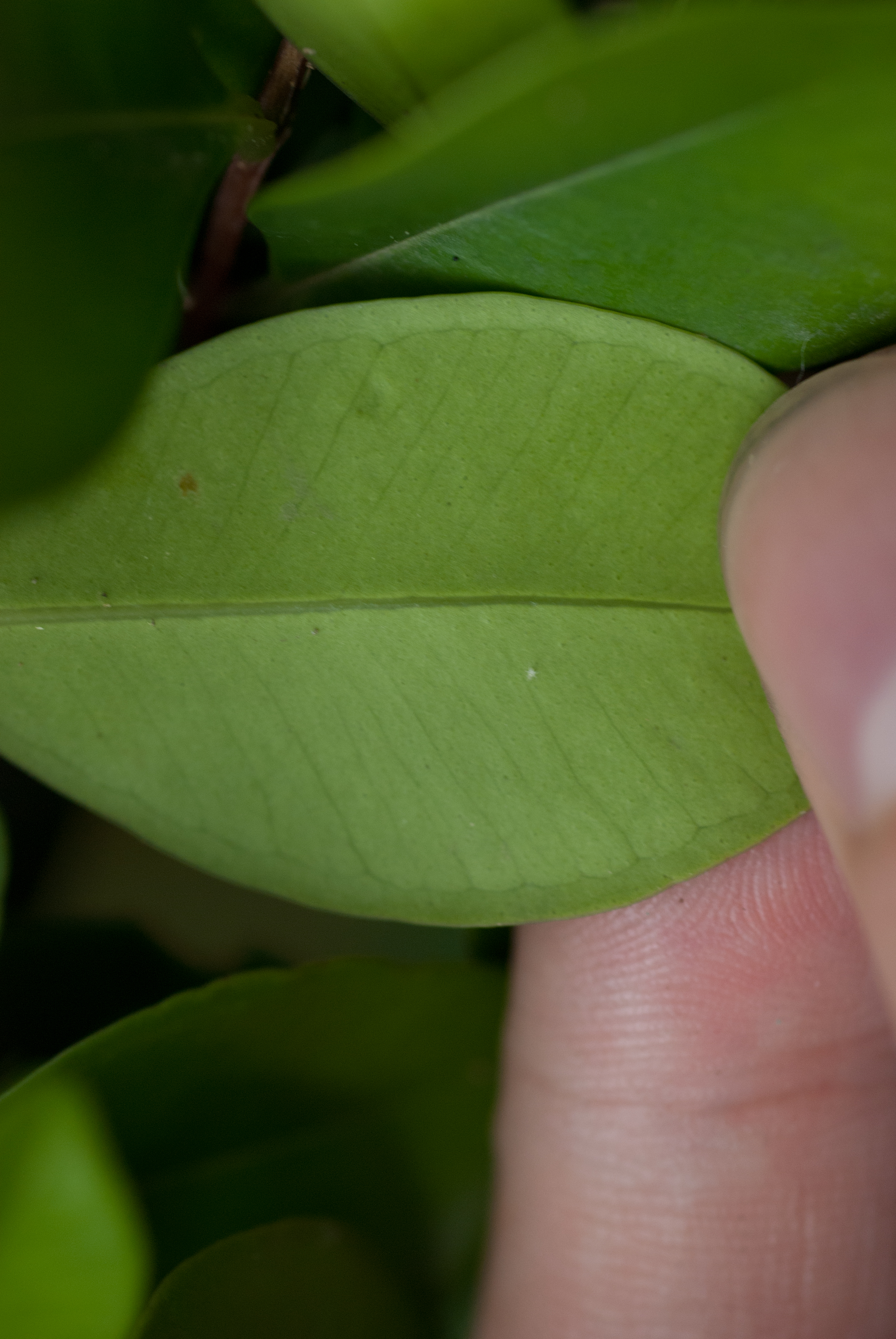
Close-up of leaf with human thumbnail for scale
