= MTTD =

MTTD may refer to:

- MT-TD, or mitochondrially encoded tRNA aspartic acid, a type of transfer RNA in human biology
- Motor Transport and Traffic Directorate, an agency of the Ghana Police Service
- Mean time to detection, a statistic in reliability engineering
- Medium Tactical Truck Demonstrator, a variant in the U.S. Army Family of Medium Tactical Vehicles
