= Threshold expression =

Mitochondrial threshold effect is a phenomenon where the number of mutated mtDNA has surpassed a certain threshold which causes the electron transport chain and ATP synthesis of a mitochondrion to fail. There isn't a set number that needs to be surpassed, however, it is associated with an increase of the number of mutated mtDNA. When there is 60-80% of mutated mtDNA present, that is said to be the threshold level. While 60-80% is the general threshold level, this is also dependent on the individual, the specific organ in question and what the specific mutation is. There are three specific types of mitochondrial threshold effects: phenotypic threshold effect, biochemical threshold effect and translational threshold effect.

Threshold expression is a phenomenon in which phenotypic expression of a mitochondrial disease within an organ system occurs when the severity of the mutation, relative number of mutant mtDNA, and reliance of the organ system on oxidative phosphorylation combine in such a way that ATP production of the tissue falls below the level required by the tissue. The phenotype may be expressed even if the percentage of mutant mtDNA is below 50% if the mutation is severe enough.

== Phenotypic threshold effect ==
Phenotypic threshold effect is when there is a certain amount of wild-type mtDNA present in the mitochondrion which is able to balance out the number of mutated mtDNA. As a result, the phenotype is normal. However, if the number of wild-type mtDNA decreases and the number of mutant mtDNA increases, resulting in an imbalance between the two, the threshold level has been altered which causes complications. This occurs because the wild-type mtDNA present are able to keep the electron transport chain and ATP synthesis functioning despite there being a few number of them present. They are able to counterbalance the mutated mtDNA, however, when the number drops below threshold level the mutant mtDNA take over.

== See also ==
- Heteroplasmy
