= Supercluster (disambiguation) =

Supercluster is the astronomical assemblage.

Supercluster may also refer to:

- Supercluster (band)
- Supercluster (genetic)
