= Heteroplasmy =

Polymorphism of organellar DNA sequences in a cell

Heteroplasmy describes the presence of different copies of organellar DNA (mitochondrial DNA (mtDNA) or plastid DNA) within a single cell or individual. Although previously considered a transient, and often, deleterious state, persistent populations of heteroplasmic individuals have been recorded across plants, animals, and fungi. In animals and fungi, heteroplasmy can be found in mtDNA while plants can exhibit heteroplasmy in mtDNA and ptDNA. Heteroplasmy exists at various degrees of severity and can be caused by various processes such as somatic mutation, DNA recombination, and paternal mtDNA leakage. It is hypothesized to also be caused by the incorporation of DNA from endosymbionts, though this is a relatively recent hypothesis and remains to be tested.

Although low levels of heteroplasmy are common among human populations, severe heteroplasmy can cause mitochondrial diseases when deleterious mtDNA mutants reach a threshold beyond which the proportion of wild-type mitochondria can no longer compensate for the dysfunctional mutants. Heteroplasmy is also linked to aging as new mutations accumulate and as the frequencies of different copies of mtDNA fluctuate under various selective pressures.

== Types ==
The type of heteroplasmy can be sorted in two ways: the hierarchical level at which the heteroplasmy is present, and the way in which mutant haplotypes differ from the wild-type.

Hierarchical level refers to the level of biological organization at which different organellar haplotypes can be observed. At the lowest level, a single organelle could contain multiple haplotypes. Next, a single cell could contain organelles with different haplotypes. Lastly, an organism can contain cells with different haplotypes.

Heteroplasmy types can be further broken down into length heteroplasmy and site heteroplasmy. In length heteroplasmy, the two haplotypes differ in length through deletion and duplication. In site heteroplasmy, there are differences in the actual sequences of the two haplotypes (e.g. SNPs).

== Causes ==
Heteroplasmy can be created through many different mechanisms.

De novo single-nucleotide polymorphisms (SNPs) can arise through somatic mutation in organellar DNA, forming the most basic example of heteroplasmy. Heteroplasmy can also be passed from parent to offspring with changes in the frequencies of the mutant copies due to stochastic processes in organellar inheritance. Outside of these sources of heteroplasmy, there are other proposed mechanisms by which heteroplasmy may be generated, with various amounts of evidence for each.

Biparental mtDNA inheritance and paternal mtDNA leakage are one of the more widely studied potential causes of heteroplasmy. According to various studies, rarely, paternal mtDNA is able to enter oocytes creating heteroplasmy within the resulting offspring. However, skeptics state the evidence to be insufficient, as observations of paternal mtDNA leakage could instead be attributed to paternal nuclear mitochondrial DNA segments (NUMTS) imbedded in nuclear DNA rather than in the mitochondria.

New mutants can also be generated via recombination. Recombination occurs in sequences with short repeats, creating sublimons, rare excised sequences of the mtDNA whose detection is indicative of these heteroplasmy-generating recombination events. These sublimons themselves can also be considered a form of heteroplasmy, as these may replicate independently of the original mtDNA molecule and take over some tasks of the original mtDNA in a process called stoichiometric shifting.

If paternal mtDNA leakage truly occurs, more mutants can be generated via recombination between paternal and maternal mtDNA.

== Prevalence and epidemiology ==
The prevalence of heteroplasmy can be studied at many hierarchical levels.

1. Heteroplasmy at the level of the individual organelle (mitochondrion or chloroplast);
2. Heteroplasmy at the level of a single cell;
3. Heteroplasmy at the level of a tissue;
4. Heteroplasmy at the level of an individual organism;
5. Heteroplasmy within a population;
6. Heteroplasmy across different species.

The frequency of heteroplasmy at these different hierchical level is mediated by various selective pressures.

=== Fluctuations in frequency ===
Various forces shape the frequency of various mutant organellar DNA in heteroplasmic individuals. These forces separate into two categories: stochastic and deterministic. In stochastic forces, frequencies of the different copies of organellar DNA shift randomly. Many of these are caused by the randomness of processes related to organelle inheritance. This can occur at the cellular level as vegetative segregation during cell division when the organelles of a heteroplasmic cell segregate randomly between daughter cells, creating new cells with a potentially different frequency of each organellar DNA copy.

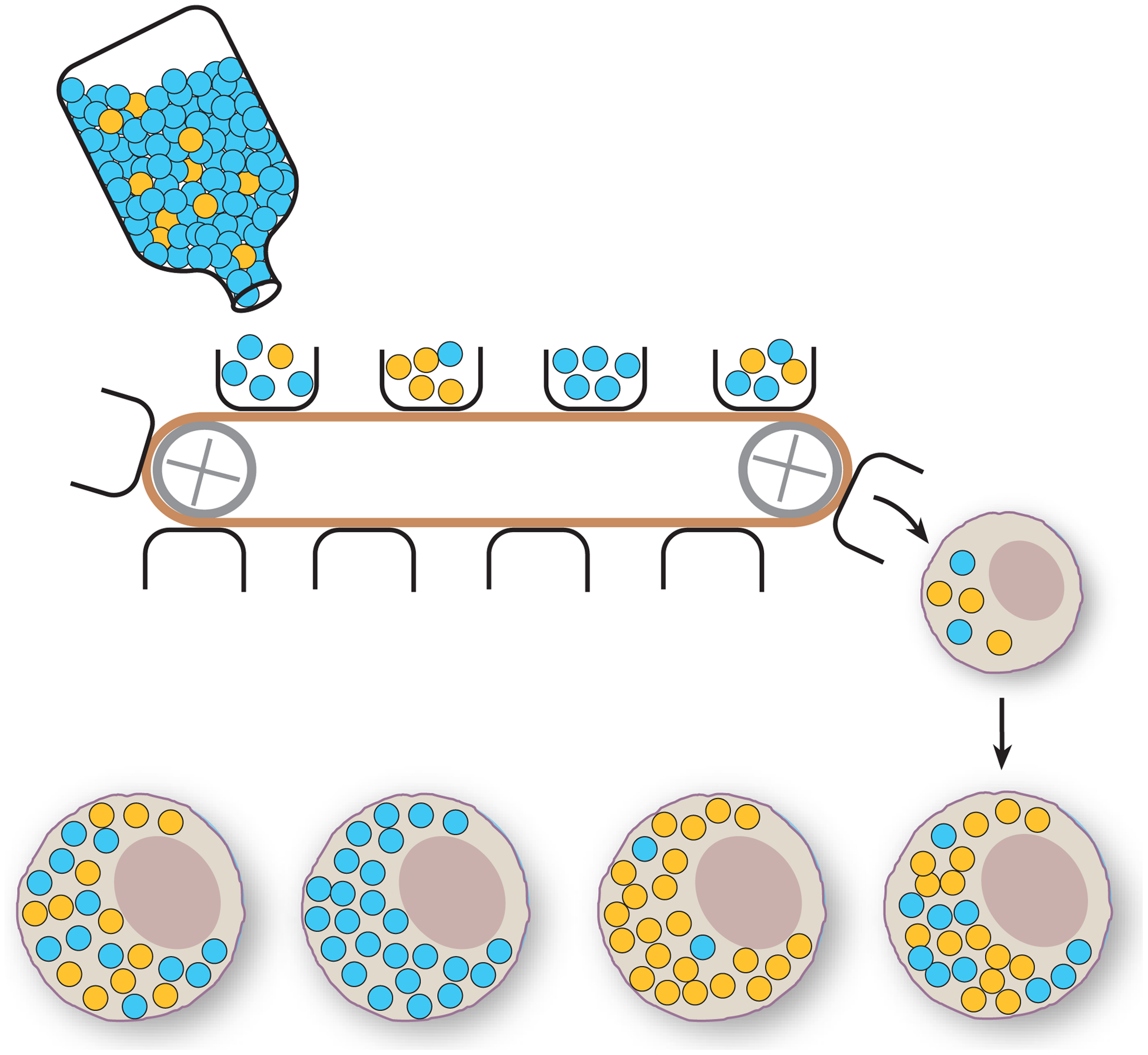
There is a wide variety of mitochondrial DNA genotypes in the maternal pool, which is represented by the bottle. The two genotypes in this maternal pool are represented by blue and yellow. When generated, each oocyte receives a small subsampling of mitochondrial DNA molecules in differing proportions. This is represented by the conveyor belt with oocytes, each one unique, as they are produced.

This random segregation in heteroplasmic cells is hypothesized to decrease the negative effects of slow accumulations of copies of deleterious mutants (Muller's ratchet). Termed the mitochondrial bottleneck, this random segregation of organelles increases cell-to-cell variability in mutant load. As an organism develops, cell-level selection may then act to remove those cells with more mutant mtDNA, leading to a stabilisation or reduction in mutant load between generations. The mechanism underlying the bottleneck is debated, with a recent mathematical and experimental metastudy providing evidence for a combination of random partitioning of mtDNAs at cell divisions and random turnover of mtDNA molecules within the cell.

In deterministic forces, heteroplasmic entities are subjected to various forms of natural selection which result in fluctuations in the frequencies of various organellar DNA copies. Both purifying selection and balancing selection can be present depending on the effects of the various mutant organellar DNA copies and fluctuations in the environment of said entities. Under purifying selection, entities with an excessively high proportion of the deleterious mutant do not reproduce, thereby reducing the frequency of that mutant. Conversely, fluctuations in environmental situations can theoretically favour the co-existence of multiple mutant copies, pushing heteroplasmic frequencies under balancing selection.

=== Microheteroplasmy ===
Microheteroplasmy is defined as the presence of mutation levels of up to about 1−5% of an organism's mitochondrial genomes. Microheteroplasmy as a concept remains chiefly a relic of previous technical limitations where PCR and DNA sequencing were not able to detect lower frequencies of mutations of <10%. In human mitochondrial DNA, microheteroplasmy can include hundreds of independent mutations in one organism, with each mutation usually found in 1–2% of all mitochondrial genomes. Very low-level heteroplasmic variance is present in essentially all individuals, and is likely to be due to both inherited and somatic single base substitutions.

=== Detection ===
DNA sequencing is the main way by which heteroplasmy can be detected. Quantification of heteroplasmy can be done through qPCR with fluorescence detection. Heteroplasmy can also be measured using southern hybridization.

One of the main challenges with detecting and identifying heteroplasmy is the existence of nuclear mitochondrial DNA segments (NUMTS). Copies of mitochondrial DNA can integrate themselves into nuclear DNA, giving the illusion of multiple different mutant copies of organellar DNA.

In the context of disease, screening procedures can be used to detect the proportion of deleterious organellar DNA copies to determine the potential disease severity. Preimplantation genetic screening (PGS) can be used to quantify the risk of a child of being affected by a mitochondrial disease. In most cases, a muscle mutation level of approximately 18% or less confers a 95% risk reduction.

== Disease ==
Heteroplasmy is common among human populations though many individuals only exhibit microheteroplasmy where only low levels of mutant organellar DNA copies are present. However, disease can develop when the proportion of the deleterious DNA copies exceeds a critical threshold. In some diseases, the degree of heteroplasmy can be indicative of disease severity, such as in MELAS syndrome. Other diseases that arise under severe heteroplasmic conditions include Leber optic atrophy, Kearns-Sayre syndrome, and MERRF syndrome.

Although microheteroplasmy does not directly cause disease conditions, some studies have found links between microheteroplasmy and various illnesses such as atherosclerosis, coronary artery disease, Parkinson's disease. However, these diseases have complex risk factors and potential associations require further investigation.

== Heteroplasmy in biodiversity studies ==
Beyond studies of heteroplasmy in human populations, heteroplasmy has also been a topic of investigation in the context of biodiversity studies. Non-transient heteroplasmy has been detected in wild populations of isopods, wasps, felids, cetaceans, plantains (Plantaginaceae), carrots (Apiaceae), and basidiomycetes.

The widespread prevalence of heteroplasmy across the tree of life has implications for the study of biodiversity when it comes to measuring and classifying species using organellar DNA.

=== DNA barcoding ===
Over the years, heteroplasmy has been detected across many taxonomic groups which has raised some concerns for the use of DNA barcoding in biodiversity studies. Heteroplasmy has been found to decrease the effectiveness and accuracy of DNA barcoding for species identification in different animal systems. This decreased effectiveness can impede biodiversity monitoring (i.e. metabarcoding) if rates of heteroplasmy are high enough to obfuscate the actual number of species in a given tested sample. Additionally, species descriptions utilizing single barcoding loci such as CytB or COI may be inaccurate if the barcode sequenced does not reflect the dominant haplotype in that species and if a hybrid sequence is obtained from multiple haplotypes in an individual. These problems are not unique to heteroplasmy and also apply to NUMTS.

Many solutions have been proposed to improve DNA barcoding and species identification through molecular methods, though most address heteroplasmy only indirectly.

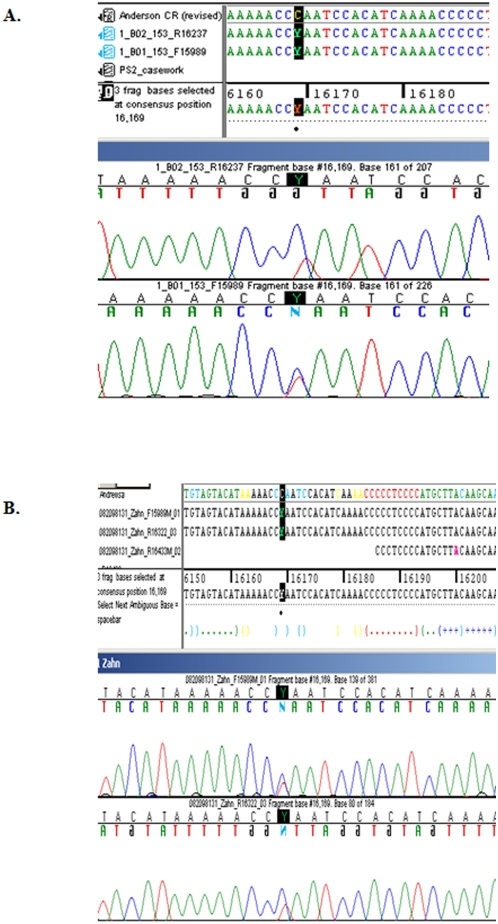
Sequence illustrating heteroplasmy genotype of 16169 C/T in Nicholas II of Russia.

== Notable cases ==
One notable example of an otherwise healthy individual whose heteroplasmy was discovered incidentally is Nicholas II of Russia, whose heteroplasmy (and that of his brother) served to convince Russian authorities of the authenticity of his remains.

== See also ==
- Homoplasmy
- Microheteroplasmy
- Mitochondrial diseases
- Nuclear mitochondrial DNA segment
