= Paternal mtDNA transmission =

Mitochondrial DNA inheritance from father

In genetics, paternal mtDNA transmission and paternal mtDNA inheritance refer to the incidence of mitochondrial DNA (mtDNA) being passed from a father to his offspring. Paternal mtDNA inheritance is observed in a small proportion of species; in general, mtDNA is passed unchanged from a mother to her offspring, making it an example of non-Mendelian inheritance. In contrast, mtDNA transmission from both parents occurs regularly in certain bivalves.

== In animals ==
Paternal mtDNA inheritance in animals varies. For example, in Mytilidae mussels, paternal mtDNA "is transmitted through the sperm and establishes itself only in the male gonad." In testing 172 sheep, "The Mitochondrial DNA from three lambs in two half-sib families were found to show paternal inheritance." An instance of paternal leakage resulted in a study on chickens. There has been evidences that paternal leakage is an integral part of mitochondrial inheritance of Drosophila simulans.

== In humans ==
Mitochondrial Inheritance Patterns

In human mitochondrial genetics, there is debate over whether or not paternal mtDNA transmission is possible. Many studies hold that paternal mtDNA is never transmitted to offspring. This thought is central to mtDNA genealogical DNA testing and to the theory of mitochondrial Eve. The fact that mitochondrial DNA is maternally inherited enables researchers to trace maternal lineage far back in time. Y chromosomal DNA, paternally inherited, is used in an analogous way to trace the agnate lineage.

Since the father's mtDNA is located in the sperm midpiece (the mitochondrial sheath), which is lost at fertilization, all children of the same mother are hemizygous for maternal mtDNA and are thus identical to each other and to their mother. Because of its cytoplasmic location in eukaryotes, mtDNA does not undergo meiosis and there is normally no crossing-over, hence there is no opportunity for introgression of the father's mtDNA. All mtDNA is thus inherited maternally; mtDNA has been used to infer the pedigree of the well-known "mitochondrial Eve."

In sexual reproduction, paternal mitochondria found in the sperm are actively decomposed, thus preventing "paternal leakage". Mitochondria in mammalian sperm are usually destroyed by the egg cell after fertilization. In 1999 it was reported that paternal sperm mitochondria (containing mtDNA) are marked with ubiquitin to select them for later destruction inside the embryo. Some in vitro fertilization (IVF) techniques, particularly intracytoplasmic sperm injection (ICSI) of a sperm into an oocyte, may interfere with this.

It is now understood that the tail of the sperm, which contains additional mtDNA, may also enter the egg. This had led to increased controversy about the fate of paternal mtDNA.

Over the last 5 years, there has been considerable debate as to whether there is recombination in human mitochondrial DNA (mtDNA) (for references, see Piganeau and Eyre-Walker, 2004). That debate appears to have finally come to an end with the publication of some direct evidence of recombination. Schwartz and Vissing (2002) presented the case of a 28-year-old man who had both maternal and paternally derived mtDNA in his muscle tissue – in all his other tissues he had only maternally derived mtDNA. It was the first time that paternal leakage and, consequently, heteroplasmy was observed in human mtDNA. In a recent paper, Kraytsberg et al (2004) take this observation one step further, and claim to show that there has been recombination between the maternal and paternal mtDNA in this individual.

Some sources state that so little paternal mtDNA is transmitted as to be negligible ("At most, one presumes it must be less than 1 in 1000, since there are 100 000 mitochondria in the human egg and only 100 in the sperm (Satoh and Kuroiwa, 1991).") or that paternal mtDNA is so rarely transmitted as to be negligible ("Nevertheless, studies have established that paternal mtDNA is so rarely transmitted to offspring that mtDNA analyses remain valid..."). A few studies indicate that, very rarely, a small portion of a person's mitochondria can be inherited from the father.

The controversy about human paternal leakage was summed up in the 1996 study Misconceptions about mitochondria and mammalian fertilization: Implications for theories on human evolution, which was peer-reviewed and printed in Proceedings of the National Academy of Sciences. According to the study's abstract:

In vertebrates, inheritance of mitochondria is thought to be predominantly maternal, and mitochondrial DNA analysis has become a standard taxonomic tool. In accordance with the prevailing view of strict maternal inheritance, many sources assert that during fertilization, the sperm tail, with its mitochondria, gets excluded from the embryo. This is incorrect. In the majority of mammals—including humans—the midpiece mitochondria can be identified in the embryo even though their ultimate fate is unknown. The "missing mitochondria" story seems to have survived—and proliferated—unchallenged in a time of contention between hypotheses of human origins, because it supports the "African Eve" model of recent radiation of Homo sapiens out of Africa.

The mixing of maternal and paternal mtDNA was thought to have been found in chimpanzees in 1999 and in humans in 1999 and 2018. This last finding is significant, as biparental mtDNA was observed in subsequent generations in three different families leading to the conclusion that, although the maternal transmission dogma remains strong, there is evidence that paternal transmission does exist and there is probably a mechanism which, if elucidated, can be a new tool in the reproductive field (e.g. avoiding mitochondrial replacement therapy, and just using this mechanism so that the offspring inherit the paternal mitochondria). However, there has been only a single documented case among humans in which as much as 90% of a single tissue type's mitochondria was inherited through paternal transmission.

According to the 2005 study More evidence for non-maternal inheritance of mitochondrial DNA?, heteroplasmy is a "newly discovered form of inheritance for mtDNA. Heteroplasmy introduces slight statistical uncertainty in normal inheritance patterns." Heteroplasmy may result from a mutation during development which is propagated to only a subset of the adult cells, or may occur when two slightly different mitochondrial sequences are inherited from the mother as a result of several hundred mitochondria being present in the ovum. However, the 2005 study states:

Multiple types (or recombinant types) of quite dissimilar mitochondrial DNA from different parts of the known mtDNA phylogeny are often reported in single individuals. From re-analyses and corrigenda of forensic mtDNA data, it is apparent that the phenomenon of mosaic or mixed mtDNA can be ascribed solely to contamination and sample mix up.

A study published in PNAS in 2018 titled Biparental Inheritance of Mitochondrial DNA in Humans found paternal mtDNA (ranging from 24 to 76%) in 17 individuals from three unrelated multigeneration families known to have a high level of mtDNA heteroplasmy:

A comprehensive exploration of mtDNA segregation in these families shows biparental mtDNA transmission with an autosomal dominantlike inheritance mode. Our results suggest that, although the central dogma of maternal inheritance of mtDNA remains valid, there are some exceptional cases where paternal mtDNA could be passed to the offspring.

== In protozoa ==
Some organisms, such as Cryptosporidium, have mitochondria with no DNA whatsoever.

== In plants ==
In plants, it has also been reported that mitochondria can occasionally be inherited from the father, e.g. in bananas. A recent study further demonstrated that paternal mitochondrial transmission also occurs in Nicotiana tabacum (tobacco), where paternal mitochondria are able to rescue plant growth and developmental defects caused by mutant mitochondria inherited from the mother. Some Conifers also show paternal inheritance of mitochondria, such as the coast redwood, Sequoia sempervirens.

== See also ==
- Y-chromosomal Adam
- Patrilineality
- Matrilineality
- Human mitochondrial genetics
- Human migration
- RecLOH
- List of genetic genealogy topics
