= MT-TM =

Transfer RNA

mitochondrially encoded tRNA methionine

Identifiers
- Symbol: MT-TM
- Alt. symbols: MTTM
- NCBI gene: 4569
- HGNC: 7492
- RefSeq: NC_001807

Other data
- Locus: Chr. MT

Mitochondrially encoded tRNA methionine also known as MT-TM is a transfer RNA which in humans is encoded by the mitochondrial MT-TM gene.

MT-TM is a small 68 nucleotide RNA (human mitochondrial map position 4402-4469) that transfers the amino acid methionine to a growing polypeptide chain at the ribosome site of protein synthesis during translation.
