= MT-TT =

Transfer RNA

Identifiers
- Aliases: MT-TT, TRNT, RF00005
- External IDs: OMIM: 590090; MGI: 102473; GeneCards: MT-TT
Orthologs
Databases	NCBI: entry; OMA: entry
Species	Human	Mouse
Entrez	4576	17744
Ensembl	ENSG00000210195	ENSMUSG00000064371
UniProt	n a	n/a
RefSeq (mRNA)	n/a	n/a
RefSeq (protein)	n/a	n/a
Location (UCSC)	n/a	n/a
PubMed search
- Wikidata
View/Edit Human	View/Edit Mouse

Mitochondrially encoded tRNA threonine also known as MT-TT is a transfer RNA which in humans is encoded by the mitochondrial MT-TT gene.

== Structure ==
The MT-TT gene is located on the p arm of the non-nuclear mitochondrial DNA at position 12 and it spans 66 base pairs. The structure of a tRNA molecule is a distinctive folded structure which contains three hairpin loops and resembles a three-leafed clover.

== Function ==
MT-TT is a small 66 nucleotide RNA (human mitochondrial map position 15888-15953) that transfers the amino acid threonine to a growing polypeptide chain at the ribosome site of protein synthesis during translation.

== Clinical significance ==
=== Myoclonic epilepsy with ragged-red fibers (MERRF) ===
Mutations in MT-TT have been associated with myoclonic epilepsy with ragged-red fibers (MERRF), and cause mitochondrial energy deficiencies and reduced proliferation leading to oxidative phosphorylation. Myoclonic epilepsy with ragged-red fibers (MERRF) is a rare mitochondrial disorder that affects many parts of the body, particularly the muscles and nervous system. In most cases, the signs and symptoms of this disorder appear during childhood or adolescence. The features of MERRF vary widely among affected individuals, even among members of the same family. Common clinical manifestations include myoclonus, myopathy, spasticity, epilepsy, peripheral neuropathy, dementia, ataxia, atrophy and more. In addition, mutations have also been linked to lethal infantile mitochondrial myopathy, Parkinson's disease associated with a 15950G>A mutation, and a 15923A>G mutation found to result in an unconfirmed heart disease.

=== Cytochrome c oxidase deficiency ===
MT-TT mutations result in complex IV deficiency of the mitochondrial respiratory chain, also known as the cytochrome c oxidase deficiency. Cytochrome c oxidase deficiency is a rare genetic condition that can affect multiple parts of the body, including skeletal muscles, the heart, the brain, or the liver. Common clinical manifestations include myopathy, hypotonia, and encephalomyopathy, lactic acidosis, and hypertrophic cardiomyopathy. A 15915G>A mutation was found in a patient with cytochrome c oxidase deficiency with accompany symptoms of seizures, progressive hearing loss and muscle weakness.
