= MT-TL2 =

Transfer RNA

mitochondrially encoded tRNA leucine 2 (CUN)

Identifiers
- Symbol: MT-TL2
- Alt. symbols: MTTL2
- NCBI gene: 4568
- HGNC: 7491
- RefSeq: NC_001807

Other data
- Locus: Chr. MT

Mitochondrially encoded tRNA leucine 2 (CUN) also known as MT-TL2 is a transfer RNA which in humans is encoded by the mitochondrial MT-TL2 gene.

== Function ==
MT-TL2 is a small 71 nucleotide RNA (human mitochondrial map position 12266-12336) that transfers the amino acid leucine to a growing polypeptide chain at the ribosome site of protein synthesis during translation.

== Structure ==
The MT-TL2 gene is located on the p arm of the mitochondrial DNA at position 12 and it spans 75 base pairs. The structure of a tRNA molecule is a distinctive folded structure which contains three hairpin loops and resembles a three-leafed clover.

== Clinical significance ==
Mutations in MT-TL2 can result in multiple mitochondrial deficiencies and associated disorders, including cardiopathy, myopathy, and encephalomyopathy. A patient with a mutation G12315A was found with encephalomyopathy with ragged-red muscle fibers. A patient with a mutation of A12320G exhibited mitochondrial myopathy, and showed signs of mitochondrial myopathy. In addition, multiple individuals with a T12297C substitution showed signs of cardiomyopathy accompanied with varying degrees.

MT-TL2 mutations have also been associated with complex IV deficiency of the mitochondrial respiratory chain, also known as the cytochrome c oxidase deficiency. Cytochrome c oxidase deficiency is a rare genetic condition that can affect multiple parts of the body, including skeletal muscles, the heart, the brain, or the liver. Common clinical manifestations include myopathy, hypotonia, and encephalomyopathy, lactic acidosis, and hypertrophic cardiomyopathy. A patient with a 12316G>A mutation in MT-TL2 was found with the deficiency.
