= MT-TN =

Transfer RNA

mitochondrially encoded tRNA asparagine

Identifiers
- Symbol: MT-TN
- Alt. symbols: MTTN
- NCBI gene: 4570
- HGNC: 7493
- RefSeq: NC_001807

Other data
- Locus: Chr. MT

Mitochondrially encoded tRNA asparagine also known as MT-TN is a transfer RNA which in humans is encoded by the mitochondrial MT-TN gene.

== Structure ==
The MT-TN gene is located on the p arm of the non-nuclear mitochondrial DNA at position 12 and it spans 73 base pairs. The structure of a tRNA molecule is a distinctive folded structure which contains three hairpin loops and resembles a three-leafed clover.

== Function ==
MT-TN is a small 73 nucleotide RNA (human mitochondrial map position 5657-5729) that transfers the amino acid asparagine to a growing polypeptide chain at the ribosome site of protein synthesis during translation.

== Clinical significance ==
=== Ophthalmoplegia ===
Mutations in MT-TN have been associated with isolated ophthalmoplegia. Ophthalmoplegia is a condition characterized by eye muscle weakness. Common symptoms of the disorder include hearing loss, loss of sensation in the limbs, ataxia, and neuropathy. Multiple mutations of 5692A>G and 5703G>A have been found in patients with ophthalmoplegia. Such mutations in MT-TN resulted in a failure in oxidative phosphorylation and protein synthesis of the mitochondria. In addition, a 5728A>G transition of MT-TN was found to result in a combined deficiency of complex I and IV, with symptoms of failure to thrive, renal failure, and mental retardation.

=== Complex IV Deficiency ===
MT-TN mutations have been associated with complex IV deficiency of the mitochondrial respiratory chain, also known as the cytochrome c oxidase deficiency. Cytochrome c oxidase deficiency is a rare genetic condition that can affect multiple parts of the body, including skeletal muscles, the heart, the brain, or the liver. Common clinical manifestations include myopathy, hypotonia, and encephalomyopathy, lactic acidosis, and hypertrophic cardiomyopathy. 5709T>C mutations in MT-TN have been found in patients with the deficiency.
