= Supercluster (genetic) =

Most usage of supercluster in population genetics research articles applies to proposed large groups of human mtDNA haplotype lineages, found by cluster analysis, that are thought to stem from a single distant most recent common ancestor, on a time scale of tens of thousands of years.

== Other usage ==
Usage of supercluster for geographically defined human populations instead of mtDNA strains is rarely seen. However, it does appear in the seminal Cavalli-Sforza paper Reconstruction of human evolution: bringing together genetic, archaeological, and linguistic data. (1988) to describe "Northeurasian" and "Southeast Asian" collections of sampled populations, which are also more frequently referred to in the paper as "major cluster" or simply "cluster". Therefore use of "supercluster" as a euphemism for "race" might be considered a neologism or, more likely, an idiosyncratic usage according to the Google test.

Usage of supercluster for populations as well as haplotypes makes the term ambiguous and may require clarification when the word is used.
