= MT-TR =

Transfer RNA

mitochondrially encoded tRNA arginine

Identifiers
- Symbol: MT-TR
- Alt. symbols: MTTR
- NCBI gene: 4573
- HGNC: 7496
- RefSeq: NC_001807

Other data
- Locus: Chr. MT

Mitochondrially encoded tRNA arginine also known as MT-TR is a transfer RNA which in humans is encoded by the mitochondrial MT-TR gene.

== Structure ==
The MT-TR gene is located on the p arm of the non-nuclear mitochondrial DNA at position 12 and it spans 65 base pairs. The structure of a tRNA molecule is a distinctive folded structure which contains three hairpin loops and resembles a three-leafed clover.

== Function ==
MT-TR is a small 65 nucleotide RNA (human mitochondrial map position 10405-10469) that transfers the amino acid arginine to a growing polypeptide chain at the ribosome site of protein synthesis during translation.

== Clinical significance ==
=== Mitochondrial encephalomyopathy, lactic acidosis, and stroke-like episodes (MELAS) ===
Mutations in MT-TR have been associated with mitochondrial encephalomyopathy, lactic acidosis, and stroke-like episodes (MELAS). MELAS is a rare mitochondrial disorder known to affect many parts of the body, especially the nervous system and the brain. Symptoms of MELAS include recurrent severe headaches, muscle weakness (myopathy), hearing loss, stroke-like episodes with a loss of consciousness, seizures, and other problems affecting the nervous system. Mutations in MT-TR associated with the disease have included 10450A-G and 10438A-G.

=== Cytochrome c oxidase deficiency ===
MT-TR mutations have been associated with complex IV deficiency of the mitochondrial respiratory chain, also known as the cytochrome c oxidase deficiency. Cytochrome c oxidase deficiency is a rare genetic condition that can affect multiple parts of the body, including skeletal muscles, the heart, the brain, or the liver. Common clinical manifestations include myopathy, hypotonia, and encephalomyopathy, lactic acidosis, and hypertrophic cardiomyopathy. A 10437 G>A mutation has been found with a patient with the deficiency.
