= MT-TP =

Mitochondrial transfer RNA

mitochondrially encoded tRNA proline

Identifiers
- Symbol: MT-TP
- Alt. symbols: MTTP
- NCBI gene: 4571
- HGNC: 7494
- RefSeq: NC_001807

Other data
- Locus: Chr. MT

Mitochondrially encoded tRNA proline also known as MT-TP is a transfer RNA that in humans is encoded by the mitochondrial MT-TP gene.

== Structure ==
The MT-TP gene is located on the p arm of the non-nuclear mitochondrial DNA at position 12 and it spans 68 base pairs. The structure of a tRNA molecule is a distinctive folded structure which contains three hairpin loops and resembles a three-leafed clover.

== Function ==
MT-TP is a small 68 nucleotide RNA (human mitochondrial map position 15956-16023) that transfers the amino acid proline to a growing polypeptide chain at the ribosome site of protein synthesis during translation. MT-TP is responsible for coding the microsomal triglyceride transfer protein, which is required for the synthesis of beta-lipoproteins in the liver and intestine. Beta-lipoproteins are essential in fat, cholesterol, and fat-soluble vitamin transport from the intestine to the bloodstream for absorption.

== Clinical significance ==
=== Abetalipoproteinemia ===
Mutations in MT-TP have been associated with abetalipoproteinemia. Abetalipoproteinemia is an inherited disorder characterized by an impaired absorption of fats and certain vitamins from the diet. Mutations in MT-TP cause an impaired microsomal triglyceride transfer protein and lead to reduced or absent beta-lipoprotein. The dysfunction of the microsomal triglyceride transfer protein then results in insufficient levels of fats, cholesterol, and vitamins, which are necessary for growth and development. Therefore, clinical manifestations of abetalipoproteinemia include impaired weight gain and growth, failure to thrive, diarrhea, and steatorrhea. Mutations of GLY865TER, SER590ILE, ASN780TYR, ARG540HIS, IVS9AS, and ARG215TER of the MT-TP gene have been found in patients with the disease.

=== Complex I deficiency ===
MT-TP mutations may result in complex I deficiency of the mitochondrial respiratory chain, which may cause a wide variety of signs and symptoms affecting many organs and systems of the body, particularly the nervous system, the heart, and the muscles used for movement (skeletal muscles). These signs and symptoms can appear at any time from birth to adulthood. Phenotypes of the condition include encephalopathy, epilepsy, dystonia, hypotonia, myalgia, exercise intolerance, and more. A G15975A mutation has been found in a patient with the deficiency. In addition, MT-TP mutations have been associated with late-onset ataxia, retinitis, pigmentosa, deafness, leukoencephalopathy, and complex IV deficiency.
