= MT-TY =

Transfer RNA

mitochondrially encoded tRNA tyrosine

Identifiers
- Symbol: MT-TY
- Alt. symbols: MTTY
- NCBI gene: 4579
- HGNC: 7502
- RefSeq: NC_001807

Other data
- Locus: Chr. MT

Mitochondrially encoded tRNA tyrosine, also known as MT-TY, is a transfer RNA which in humans is encoded by the mitochondrial MT-TY gene.

== Structure ==
The MT-TY gene is located on the p arm of the non-nuclear mitochondrial DNA at position 12 and it spans 66 base pairs. The structure of a tRNA molecule is a distinctive folded structure which contains three hairpin loops and resembles a three-leafed clover.

== Function ==
MT-TY is a small 66 nucleotide RNA (human mitochondrial map position 5826-5891) that transfers the amino acid tyrosine to a growing polypeptide chain at the ribosome site of protein synthesis during translation.

== Clinical significance ==
Mutations in MT-TY have been associated with mitochondrial complex III deficiency, a genetic condition that can affect several parts of the body, including the brain, kidneys, liver, heart, and the skeletal muscles. Common clinical manifestations include muscle weakness (myopathy) and extreme tiredness (fatigue), particularly during exercise (exercise intolerance). Additional symptoms may also arise depending on the severity of the condition. A patient with a mutation of the gene exhibited complex III deficiency, characterized by high levels of cytochrome c oxidase–deficient fibers with symptoms of weakness and fatigue. A 5874A-G mutation was also found in a patient with the condition.

Changes in MT-TY may also result in progressive external ophthalmoplegia. Progressive external ophthalmoplegia is characterized by weakness of the eye muscles. Common symptoms of the disorder include hearing loss, loss of sensation in the limbs, ataxia, and neuropathy. A 5885T deletion and 5877G-A substitution have been associated with the disease.
