= MT-TG =

Transfer RNA

mitochondrially encoded tRNA glycine

Identifiers
- Symbol: MT-TG
- Alt. symbols: MTTG
- NCBI gene: 4563
- HGNC: 7486
- RefSeq: NC_001807

Other data
- Locus: Chr. MT

Mitochondrially encoded tRNA glycine also known as MT-TG is a transfer RNA which in humans is encoded by the mitochondrial MT-TG gene.

== Structure ==
The MT-TG gene is located on the p arm of the mitochondrial DNA at position 12 and it spans 68 base pairs. The structure of a tRNA molecule is a distinctive folded structure which contains three hairpin loops and resembles a three-leafed clover.

== Function ==
MT-TG is a small 68 nucleotide transfer RNA (human mitochondrial map position 9991-10058) that transfers the amino acid glycine to a growing polypeptide chain at the ribosome site of protein synthesis during translation.

== Clinical significance ==
=== Myoclonic epilepsy with ragged-red fibers (MERRF) ===
Mutations in transfer RNAs have been found to lead to marked mitochondrial energy deficiency and a hindrance of mitochondrial proliferation, and defects in oxidative phosphorylation. Such defects may result in myoclonic epilepsy with ragged-red fibers (MERRF). Myoclonic epilepsy with ragged-red fibers (MERRF) is a rare mitochondrial disorder that affects many parts of the body, particularly the muscles and nervous system. In most cases, the signs and symptoms of this disorder appear during childhood or adolescence. The features of MERRF vary widely among affected individuals, even among members of the same family. Common clinical manifestations include myoclonus, myopathy, spasticity, epilepsy, peripheral neuropathy, dementia, ataxia, atrophy and more.

=== Familial hypertrophic cardiomyopathy ===
Mutations in the MT-TG gene has also been associated with familial hypertrophic cardiomyopathy. Familial hypertrophic cardiomyopathy is a heart condition characterized by thickening of the heart, usually in the interventricular septum. Common phenotypes include chest pain, shortness of breath, physical exertion, palpitations, lightheadedness, dizziness and fainting. A family with a transition mutation of 9997T>C in the MT-TG gene exhibited familial hypertrophic cardiomyopathy.
