= MT-TQ =

Transfer RNA

mitochondrially encoded tRNA glutamine

Identifiers
- Symbol: MT-TQ
- Alt. symbols: MTTQ
- NCBI gene: 4572
- HGNC: 7495
- RefSeq: NC_001807

Other data
- Locus: Chr. MT

Mitochondrially encoded tRNA glutamine also known as MT-TQ is a transfer RNA which in humans is encoded by the mitochondrial MT-TQ gene.

MT-TQ is a small 72 nucleotide RNA (human mitochondrial map position 4329-4400) that transfers the amino acid glutamine to a growing polypeptide chain at the ribosome site of protein synthesis during translation.
