= MT-TD =

Type of transfer RNA in human biology

mitochondrially encoded tRNA aspartic acid

Identifiers
- Symbol: MT-TD
- Alt. symbols: MTTD
- NCBI gene: 4555
- HGNC: 7478
- RefSeq: NC_001807

Other data
- Locus: Chr. MT

Mitochondrially encoded tRNA aspartic acid also known as MT-TD is a transfer RNA which in humans is encoded by the mitochondrial MT-TD gene.

== Structure ==
The MT-TD gene is located on the p arm of the mitochondrial DNA at position 12 and it spans 67 base pairs. The structure of a tRNA molecule is a distinctive folded structure which contains three hairpin loops and resembles a three-leafed clover.

== Function ==
The MT-TD gene encodes for a small transfer RNA (human mitochondrial map position 7518–7585) that transfers the amino acid aspartic acid to a growing polypeptide chain at the ribosome site of protein synthesis during translation.

== Clinical significance ==
MT-TD mutations have been associated with complex IV deficiency of the mitochondrial respiratory chain, also known as cytochrome c oxidase deficiency. Cytochrome c oxidase deficiency is a rare genetic condition that can affect multiple body parts, including skeletal muscles, the heart, the brain, or the liver. Common clinical manifestations include myopathy, hypotonia, and encephalomyopathy, lactic acidosis, and hypertrophic cardiomyopathy. A patient with a 7526A>G mutation in the MT-TD gene exhibited gradually worsening symptoms of exercise intolerance, increased creatine kinase levels, sustained exercise leading to muscle pains and general malaise. A patient with a 7543A>G mutation also exhibited symptoms of the disease.
