= MT-TC =

Transfer RNA

Identifiers
- Aliases: TRNC
- External IDs: MGI: 102490; GeneCards:
Orthologs
Databases	NCBI: entry; OMA: entry
Species	Human	Mouse
Entrez	4511	17727
Ensembl	ENSG00000210140	ENSMUSG00000064349
UniProt	n a	n/a
RefSeq (mRNA)	n/a	n/a
RefSeq (protein)	n/a	n/a
Location (UCSC)	n/a	n/a
PubMed search
- Wikidata
View/Edit Human	View/Edit Mouse

Mitochondrially encoded tRNA cysteine also known as MT-TC is a transfer RNA which in humans is encoded by the mitochondrial MT-TC gene.

MT-TC is a small 82 nucleotide RNA (human mitochondrial map position 5761–5826) that transfers the amino acid cysteine to a growing polypeptide chain at the ribosome site of protein synthesis during translation.
