= MT-TA =

Transfer RNA

Identifiers
- Aliases: MT-TA, TRNA
- External IDs: OMIM: 590000; MGI: 102491; GeneCards: MT-TA
Orthologs
Databases	NCBI: entry; OMA: entry
Species	Human	Mouse
Entrez	4553	17726
Ensembl	ENSG00000210127	ENSMUSG00000064347
UniProt	n a	n/a
RefSeq (mRNA)	n/a	n/a
RefSeq (protein)	n/a	n/a
Location (UCSC)	n/a	n/a
PubMed search
- Wikidata
View/Edit Human	View/Edit Mouse

Mitochondrially encoded tRNA alanine also known as MT-TA is a transfer RNA, which in humans is encoded by the mitochondrial MT-TA gene.

MT-TA is a small 69 nucleotide RNA (human mitochondrial map position 5587-5655) that transfers the amino acid alanine to a growing polypeptide chain at the ribosome site of protein synthesis during translation.

It has been reported that the 5650G-A mutation on MT-TA may cause muscular dystrophy.
