= Respiratory complex I =

Protein complex involved in cellular respiration

Identifiers
- Symbol: Respiratory complex I
- OPM superfamily: 246
- OPM protein: 6g72
- Membranome: 255

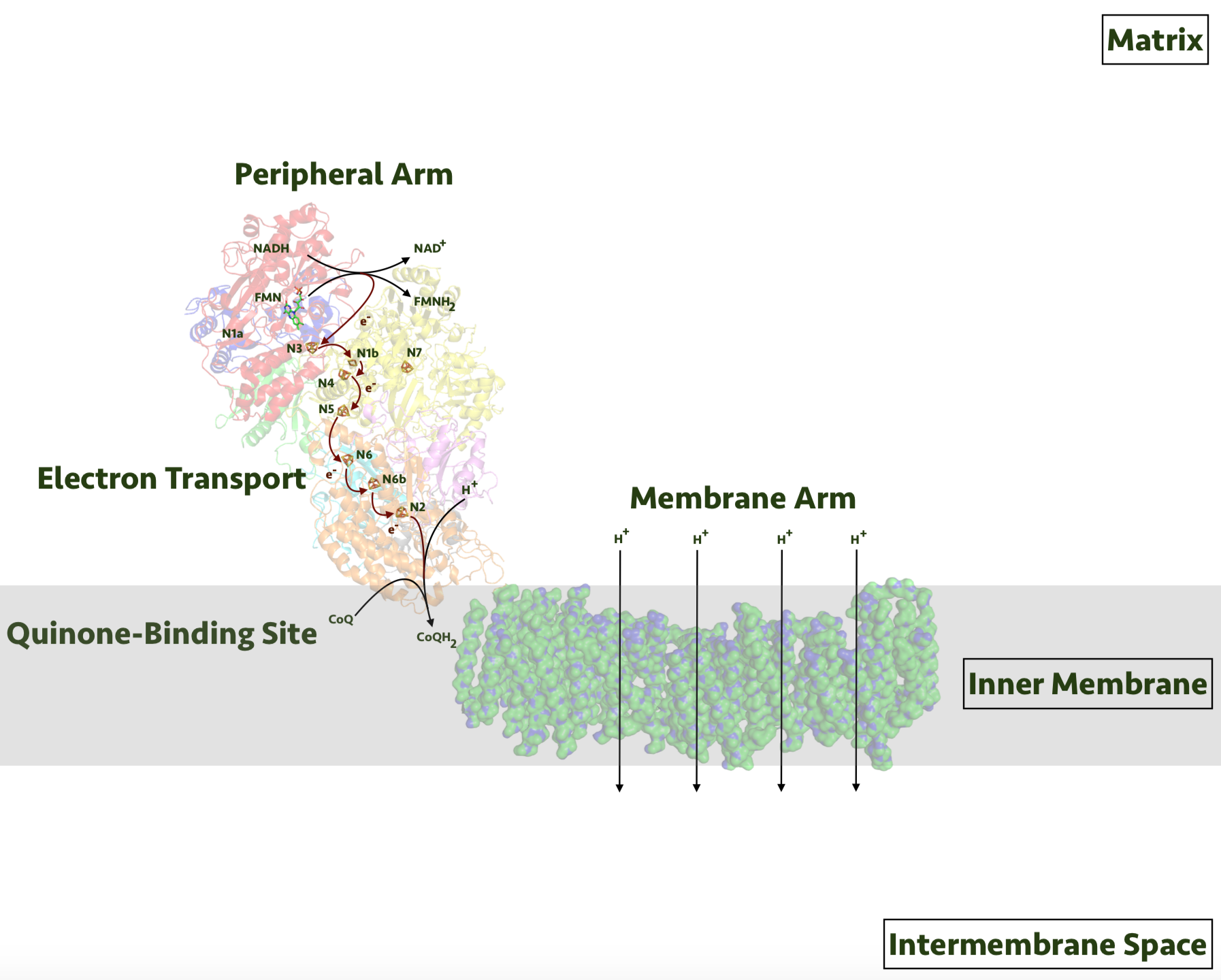
NADH Dehydrogenase Mechanism: 1. The seven primary iron sulfur centers serve to carry electrons from the site of NADH dehydration to ubiquinone. Note that N7 is not found in eukaryotes. 2. There is a reduction of ubiquinone (CoQ) to ubiquinol (CoQH_{2}). 3. The energy from the redox reaction results in conformational change allowing hydrogen ions to pass through four transmembrane helix channels.

Respiratory complex I, EC 7.1.1.2 (also known as NADH:ubiquinone oxidoreductase, Type I NADH dehydrogenase and mitochondrial complex I) is the first large protein complex of the respiratory chains of many organisms from bacteria to humans. It catalyzes the transfer of electrons from NADH to coenzyme Q10 (CoQ10) and translocates protons across the inner mitochondrial membrane in eukaryotes or the plasma membrane of bacteria.

NADH:ubiquinone reductase (H^{+}-translocating).

Identifiers
- EC no.: 7.1.1.2

Databases
- BRENDA: enzyme data
- ExPASy: NiceZyme view
- KEGG: enzyme entry
- MetaCyc: metabolic pathway
- Rhea: reactions
- PDB structures: RCSB PDB PDBe PDBsum
- Gene Ontology: AmiGO / QuickGO
Search
- PMC: articles
- PubMed: articles
- NCBI: proteins

This enzyme is essential for the normal functioning of cells, and mutations in its subunits lead to a wide range of inherited neuromuscular and metabolic disorders. Defects in this enzyme are responsible for the development of several pathological processes such as ischemia/reperfusion damage (stroke and cardiac infarction), Parkinson's disease and others.

== Function ==
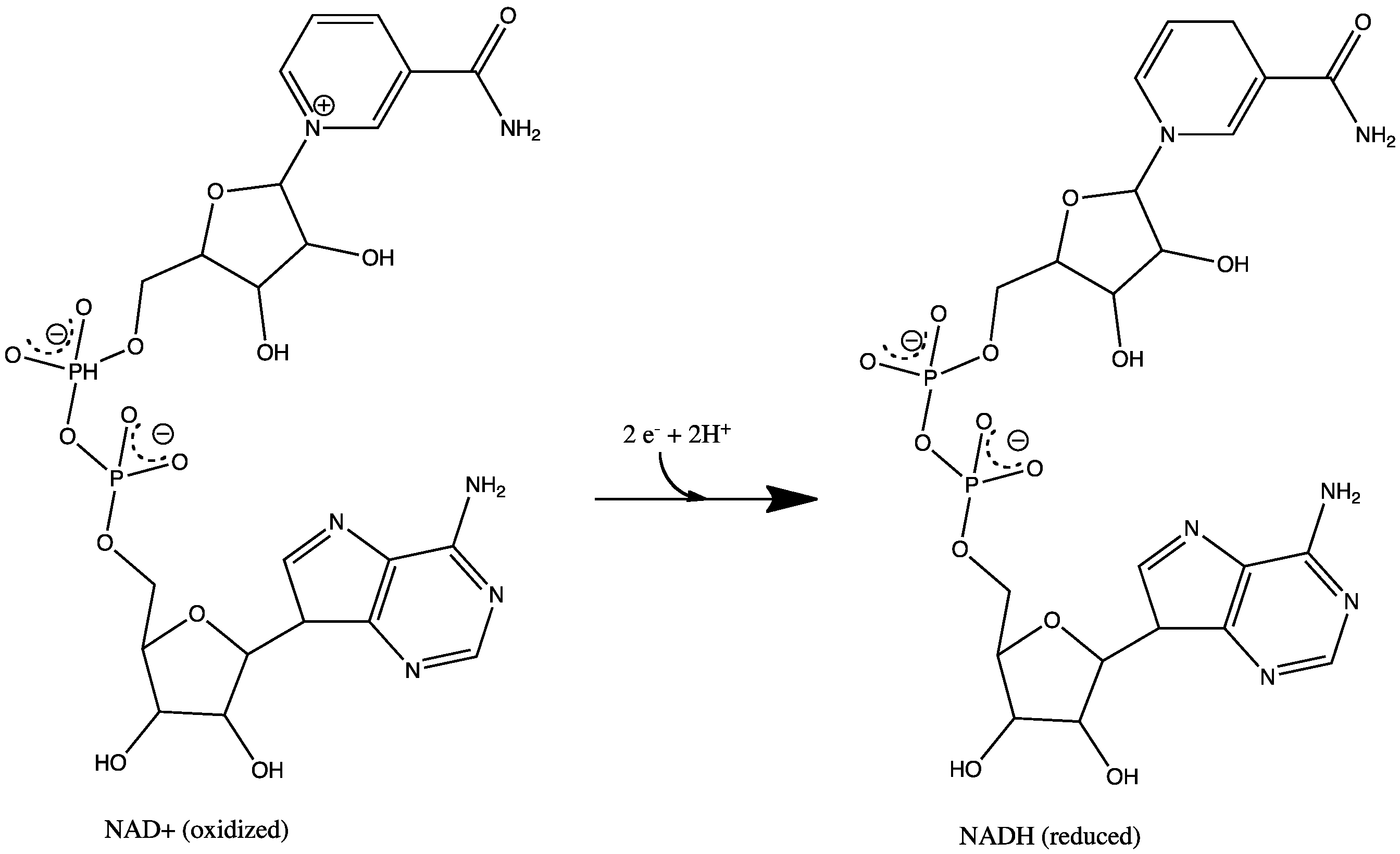
NAD^{+} to NADH.

FMN to FMNH_{2}.

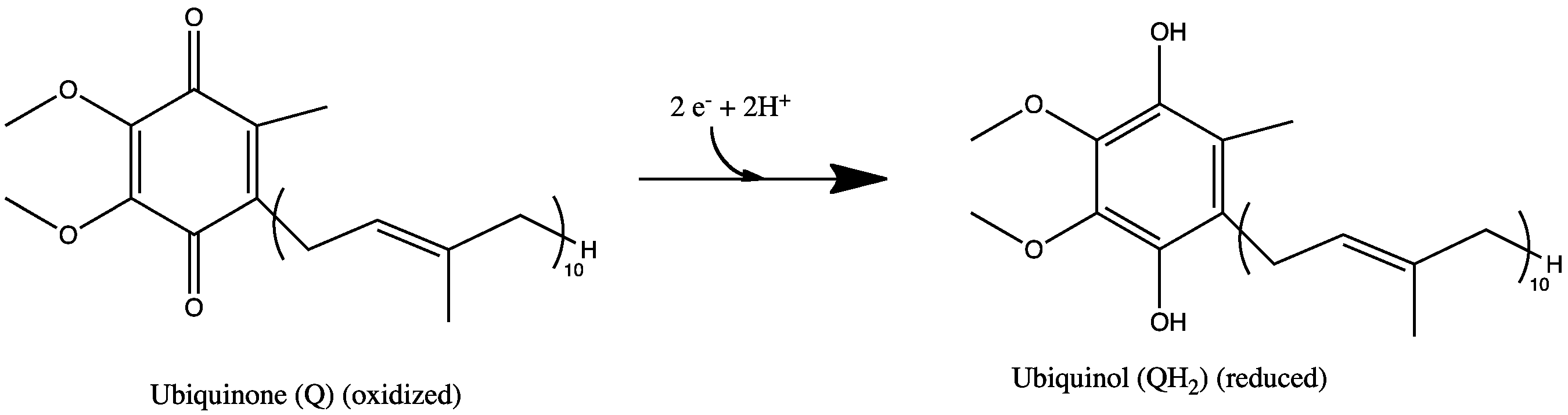
CoQ to CoQH_{2}.

Complex I is the first enzyme of the mitochondrial electron transport chain. There are three energy-transducing enzymes in the electron transport chain - NADH:ubiquinone oxidoreductase (complex I), Coenzyme Q – cytochrome c reductase (complex III), and cytochrome c oxidase (complex IV). Complex I is the largest and most complicated enzyme of the electron transport chain.

The reaction catalyzed by complex I is:

NADH + H^{+} + CoQ + 4H^{+}_{in}→ NAD^{+} + CoQH_{2} + 4H^{+}_{out}

In this process, the complex translocates four protons across the inner membrane per molecule of oxidized NADH, helping to build the electrochemical potential difference used to produce ATP. Escherichia coli complex I (NADH dehydrogenase) is capable of proton translocation in the same direction to the established Δψ, showing that in the tested conditions, the coupling ion is H^{+}. Na^{+} transport in the opposite direction was observed, and although Na^{+} was not necessary for the catalytic or proton transport activities, its presence increased the latter. H^{+} was translocated by the Paracoccus denitrificans complex I, but in this case, H^{+} transport was not influenced by Na^{+}, and Na^{+} transport was not observed. Possibly, the E. coli complex I has two energy coupling sites (one Na^{+} independent and the other Na^{+}dependent), as observed for the Rhodothermus marinus complex I, whereas the coupling mechanism of the P. denitrificans enzyme is completely Na^{+} independent. It is also possible that another transporter catalyzes the uptake of Na^{+}. Complex I energy transduction by proton pumping may not be exclusive to the R. marinus enzyme. The Na^{+}/H^{+} antiport activity seems not to be a general property of complex I. However, the existence of Na^{+}-translocating activity of the complex I is still in question.

The reaction can be reversed – referred to as aerobic succinate-supported NAD^{+} reduction by ubiquinol – in the presence of a high membrane potential, but the exact catalytic mechanism remains unknown. Driving force of this reaction is a potential across the membrane which can be maintained either by ATP-hydrolysis or by complexes III and IV during succinate oxidation.

Complex I may have a role in triggering apoptosis. In fact, there has been shown to be a correlation between mitochondrial activities and programmed cell death (PCD) during somatic embryo development.

Complex I is not homologous to Na^{+}-translocating NADH Dehydrogenase (NDH) Family (TC# 3.D.1), a member of the Na^{+} transporting Mrp superfamily.

As a result of a two NADH molecule being oxidized to NAD+, three molecules of ATP can be produced by Complex V (ATP synthase) downstream in the respiratory chain.

== Mechanism ==
=== Overall mechanism ===
All redox reactions take place in the hydrophilic domain of complex I. NADH initially binds to complex I, and transfers two electrons to the flavin mononucleotide (FMN) prosthetic group of the enzyme, creating FMNH_{2}. The electron acceptor – the isoalloxazine ring – of FMN is identical to that of FAD. The electrons are then transferred through the FMN via a series of iron-sulfur (Fe-S) clusters, and finally to coenzyme Q10 (ubiquinone). This electron flow changes the redox state of the protein, inducing conformational changes of the protein which alters the pK values of ionizable side chain, and causes four hydrogen ions to be pumped out of the mitochondrial matrix. Ubiquinone (CoQ) accepts two electrons to be reduced to ubiquinol (CoQH_{2}).

=== Electron transfer mechanism ===
The proposed pathway for electron transport prior to ubiquinone reduction is as follows: NADH – FMN – N3 – N1b – N4 – N5 – N6a – N6b – N2 – Q, where Nx is a labelling convention for iron sulfur clusters. The high reduction potential of the N2 cluster and the relative proximity of the other clusters in the chain enable efficient electron transfer over long distance in the protein (with transfer rates from NADH to N2 iron-sulfur cluster of about 100 μs).

The equilibrium dynamics of Complex I are primarily driven by the quinone redox cycle. In conditions of high proton motive force (and accordingly, a ubiquinol-concentrated pool), the enzyme runs in the reverse direction. Ubiquinol is oxidized to ubiquinone, and the resulting released protons reduce the proton motive force.

=== Proton translocation mechanism ===
The coupling of proton translocation and electron transport in Complex I is currently proposed as being indirect (long range conformational changes) as opposed to direct (redox intermediates in the hydrogen pumps as in heme groups of Complexes III and IV). The architecture of the hydrophobic region of complex I shows multiple proton transporters that are mechanically interlinked. The three central components believed to contribute to this long-range conformational change event are the pH-coupled N2 iron-sulfur cluster, the quinone reduction, and the transmembrane helix subunits of the membrane arm. Transduction of conformational changes to drive the transmembrane transporters linked by a 'connecting rod' during the reduction of ubiquinone can account for two or three of the four protons pumped per NADH oxidized. The remaining proton must be pumped by direct coupling at the ubiquinone-binding site. It is proposed that direct and indirect coupling mechanisms account for the pumping of the four protons.

The N2 cluster's proximity to a nearby cysteine residue results in a conformational change upon reduction in the nearby helices, leading to small but important changes in the overall protein conformation. Further electron paramagnetic resonance studies of the electron transfer have demonstrated that most of the energy that is released during the subsequent CoQ reduction is on the final ubiquinol formation step from semiquinone, providing evidence for the "single stroke" H^{+} translocation mechanism (i.e. all four protons move across the membrane at the same time). Alternative theories suggest a "two stroke mechanism" where each reduction step (semiquinone and ubiquinol) results in a stroke of two protons entering the intermembrane space.

The resulting ubiquinol localized to the membrane domain interacts with negatively charged residues in the membrane arm, stabilizing conformational changes. An antiporter mechanism (Na^{+}/H^{+} swap) has been proposed using evidence of conserved Asp residues in the membrane arm. The presence of Lys, Glu, and His residues enable for proton gating (a protonation followed by deprotonation event across the membrane) driven by the pK_{a} of the residues.

== Composition and structure ==
NADH:ubiquinone oxidoreductase is the largest of the respiratory complexes. In mammals, the enzyme contains 44 separate water-soluble peripheral membrane proteins, which are anchored to the integral membrane constituents. Of particular functional importance are the flavin prosthetic group (FMN) and eight iron-sulfur clusters (FeS). Of the 44 subunits, seven are encoded by the mitochondrial genome.

The structure is an "L" shape with a long membrane domain (with around 60 trans-membrane helices) and a hydrophilic (or peripheral) domain, which includes all the known redox centres and the NADH binding site. All thirteen of the E. coli proteins, which comprise NADH dehydrogenase I, are encoded within the nuo operon, and are homologous to mitochondrial complex I subunits. The antiporter-like subunits NuoL/M/N each contains 14 conserved transmembrane (TM) helices. Two of them are discontinuous, but subunit NuoL contains a 110 Å long amphipathic α-helix, spanning the entire length of the domain. The subunit, NuoL, is related to Na^{+}/ H^{+} antiporters of TC# 2.A.63.1.1 (PhaA and PhaD).

Three of the conserved, membrane-bound subunits in NADH dehydrogenase are related to each other, and to Mrp sodium-proton antiporters. Structural analysis of two prokaryotic complexes I revealed that the three subunits each contain fourteen transmembrane helices that overlay in structural alignments: the translocation of three protons may be coordinated by a lateral helix connecting them.

Complex I contains a ubiquinone binding pocket at the interface of the 49-kDa and PSST subunits. Close to iron-sulfur cluster N2, the proposed immediate electron donor for ubiquinone, a highly conserved tyrosine constitutes a critical element of the quinone reduction site. A possible quinone exchange path leads from cluster N2 to the N-terminal beta-sheet of the 49-kDa subunit. All 45 subunits of the bovine NDHI have been sequenced. Each complex contains noncovalently bound FMN, coenzyme Q and several iron-sulfur centers. The bacterial NDHs have 8-9 iron-sulfur centers.

A recent study used electron paramagnetic resonance (EPR) spectra and double electron-electron resonance (DEER) to determine the path of electron transfer through the iron-sulfur complexes, which are located in the hydrophilic domain. Seven of these clusters form a chain from the flavin to the quinone binding sites; the eighth cluster is located on the other side of the flavin, and its function is unknown. The EPR and DEER results suggest an alternating or "roller-coaster" potential energy profile for the electron transfer between the active sites and along the iron-sulfur clusters, which can optimize the rate of electron travel and allow efficient energy conversion in complex I.

Conserved subunits of Complex I
#	Human/Bovine subunit	Human protein	Protein description (UniProt)	Pfam family with Human protein
Core Subunits^{a}
1	NDUFS7 / PSST / NUKM	NDUS7_HUMAN	NADH dehydrogenase [ubiquinone] iron-sulfur protein 7, mitochondrial EC 1.6.5.3 EC 1.6.99.3	Pfam PF01058
2	NDUFS8 / TYKY / NUIM	NDUS8_HUMAN	NADH dehydrogenase [ubiquinone] iron-sulfur protein 8, mitochondrial EC 1.6.5.3 EC 1.6.99.3	Pfam PF12838
3	NDUFV2 / 24kD / NUHM^{c}	NDUV2_HUMAN	NADH dehydrogenase [ubiquinone] flavoprotein 2, mitochondrial EC 1.6.5.3 EC 1.6.99.3	Pfam PF01257
4	NDUFS3 / 30kD / NUGM	NDUS3_HUMAN	NADH dehydrogenase [ubiquinone] iron-sulfur protein 3, mitochondrial EC 1.6.5.3 EC 1.6.99.3	Pfam PF00329
5	NDUFS2 / 49kD / NUCM	NDUS2_HUMAN	NADH dehydrogenase [ubiquinone] iron-sulfur protein 2, mitochondrial EC 1.6.5.3 EC 1.6.99.3	Pfam PF00346
6	NDUFV1 / 51kD / NUBM	NDUV1_HUMAN	NADH dehydrogenase [ubiquinone] flavoprotein 1, mitochondrial EC 1.6.5.3 EC 1.6.99.3	Pfam PF01512
7	NDUFS1 / 75kD / NUAM	NDUS1_HUMAN	NADH-ubiquinone oxidoreductase 75 kDa subunit, mitochondrial EC 1.6.5.3 EC 1.6.99.3	Pfam PF00384
8	ND1 / NU1M	NU1M_HUMAN	NADH-ubiquinone oxidoreductase chain 1 EC 1.6.5.3	Pfam PF00146
9	ND2 / NU2M	NU2M_HUMAN	NADH-ubiquinone oxidoreductase chain 2 EC 1.6.5.3	Pfam PF00361, Pfam PF06444
10	ND3 / NU3M	NU3M_HUMAN	NADH-ubiquinone oxidoreductase chain 3 EC 1.6.5.3	Pfam PF00507
11	ND4 / NU4M	NU4M_HUMAN	NADH-ubiquinone oxidoreductase chain 4 EC 1.6.5.3	Pfam PF01059, Pfam PF00361
12	ND4L / NULM	NU4LM_HUMAN	NADH-ubiquinone oxidoreductase chain 4L EC 1.6.5.3	Pfam PF00420
13	ND5 / NU5M	NU5M_HUMAN	NADH-ubiquinone oxidoreductase chain 5 EC 1.6.5.3	Pfam PF00361, Pfam PF06455, Pfam PF00662
14	ND6 / NU6M	NU6M_HUMAN	NADH-ubiquinone oxidoreductase chain 6 EC 1.6.5.3	Pfam PF00499
Core accessory subunits^{b}
15	NDUFS6 / 13A	NDUS6_HUMAN	NADH dehydrogenase [ubiquinone] iron-sulfur protein 6, mitochondrial	Pfam PF10276
16	NDUFA12 / B17.2	NDUAC_HUMAN	NADH dehydrogenase [ubiquinone] 1 alpha subcomplex subunit 12	Pfam PF05071
17	NDUFS4 / AQDQ	NDUS4_HUMAN	NADH dehydrogenase [ubiquinone] iron-sulfur protein 4, mitochondrial	Pfam PF04800
18	NDUFA9 / 39kDa	NDUA9_HUMAN	NADH dehydrogenase [ubiquinone] 1 alpha subcomplex subunit 9, mitochondrial	Pfam PF01370
19	NDUFAB1 / ACPM	ACPM_HUMAN	Acyl carrier protein, mitochondrial	Pfam PF00550
20	NDUFA2 / B8	NDUA2_HUMAN	NADH dehydrogenase [ubiquinone] 1 alpha subcomplex subunit 2	Pfam PF05047
21	NDUFA1 / MFWE	NDUA1_HUMAN	NADH dehydrogenase [ubiquinone] 1 alpha subcomplex subunit 1	Pfam PF15879
22	NDUFB3 / B12	NDUB3_HUMAN	NADH dehydrogenase [ubiquinone] 1 beta subcomplex subunit 3	Pfam PF08122
23	NDUFA5 / AB13	NDUA5_HUMAN	NADH dehydrogenase [ubiquinone] 1 alpha subcomplex subunit 5	Pfam PF04716
24	NDUFA6 / B14	NDUA6_HUMAN	NADH dehydrogenase [ubiquinone] 1 alpha subcomplex subunit 6	Pfam PF05347
25	NDUFA11 / B14.7	NDUAB_HUMAN	NADH dehydrogenase [ubiquinone] 1 alpha subcomplex subunit 11	Pfam PF02466
26	NDUFB11 / ESSS	NDUBB_HUMAN	NADH dehydrogenase [ubiquinone] 1 beta subcomplex subunit 11, mitochondrial	Pfam PF10183
27	NDUFS5 / PFFD	NDUS5_HUMAN	NADH dehydrogenase [ubiquinone] iron-sulfur protein 5	Pfam PF10200
28	NDUFB4 / B15	NDUB4_HUMAN	NADH dehydrogenase [ubiquinone] 1 beta subcomplex subunit 4	Pfam PF07225
29	NDUFA13 /A13	NDUAD_HUMAN	NADH dehydrogenase [ubiquinone] 1 alpha subcomplex subunit 13	Pfam PF06212
30	NDUFB7 / B18	NDUB7_HUMAN	NADH dehydrogenase [ubiquinone] 1 beta subcomplex subunit 7	Pfam PF05676
31	NDUFA8 / PGIV	NDUA8_HUMAN	NADH dehydrogenase [ubiquinone] 1 alpha subcomplex subunit 8	Pfam PF06747
32	NDUFB9 / B22	NDUB9_HUMAN	NADH dehydrogenase [ubiquinone] 1 beta subcomplex subunit 9	Pfam PF05347
33	NDUFB10 / PDSW	NDUBA_HUMAN	NADH dehydrogenase [ubiquinone] 1 beta subcomplex subunit 10	Pfam PF10249
34	NDUFB8 / ASHI	NDUB8_HUMAN	NADH dehydrogenase [ubiquinone] 1 beta subcomplex subunit 8, mitochondrial	Pfam PF05821
35	NDUFC2 / B14.5B	NDUC2_HUMAN	NADH dehydrogenase [ubiquinone] 1 subunit C2	Pfam PF06374
36	NDUFB2 / AGGG	NDUB2_HUMAN	NADH dehydrogenase [ubiquinone] 1 beta subcomplex subunit 2, mitochondrial	Pfam PF14813
37	NDUFA7 / B14.5A	NDUA7_HUMAN	NADH dehydrogenase [ubiquinone] 1 alpha subcomplex subunit 7	Pfam PF07347
38	NDUFA3 / B9	NDUA3_HUMAN	NADH dehydrogenase [ubiquinone] 1 alpha subcomplex subunit 3	Pfam PF14987
39	NDUFA4 / MLRQ^{c,d}	NDUA4_HUMAN	NADH dehydrogenase [ubiquinone] 1 alpha subcomplex subunit 4	Pfam PF06522
40	NDUFB5 / SGDH	NDUB5_HUMAN	NADH dehydrogenase [ubiquinone] 1 beta subcomplex subunit 5, mitochondrial	Pfam PF09781
41	NDUFB1 / MNLL	NDUB1_HUMAN	NADH dehydrogenase [ubiquinone] 1 beta subcomplex subunit 1	Pfam PF08040
42	NDUFC1 / KFYI	NDUC1_HUMAN	NADH dehydrogenase [ubiquinone] 1 subunit C1, mitochondrial	Pfam PF15088
43	NDUFA10 / 42kD	NDUAA_HUMAN	NADH dehydrogenase [ubiquinone] 1 alpha subcomplex subunit 10, mitochondrial	Pfam PF01712
44	NDUFA4L2	NUA4L_HUMAN	NADH dehydrogenase [ubiquinone] 1 alpha subcomplex subunit 4-like 2	Pfam PF15880
45	NDUFV3	NDUV3_HUMAN	NADH dehydrogenase [ubiquinone] flavoprotein 3, 10kDa	-
46	NDUFB6	NDUB6_HUMAN	NADH dehydrogenase [ubiquinone] 1 beta subcomplex subunit 6	Pfam PF09782
Assembly factor proteins
47	NDUFAF1^{c}	CIA30_HUMAN	NADH dehydrogenase [ubiquinone] 1 alpha subcomplex, assembly factor 1	Pfam PF08547
48	NDUFAF2	MIMIT_HUMAN	NADH dehydrogenase [ubiquinone] 1 alpha subcomplex, assembly factor 2	Pfam PF05071
49	NDUFAF3	NDUF3_HUMAN	NADH dehydrogenase [ubiquinone] 1 alpha subcomplex assembly factor 3	Pfam PF05071
50	NDUFAF4	NDUF4_HUMAN	NADH dehydrogenase [ubiquinone] 1 alpha subcomplex, assembly factor 4	Pfam PF06784

Notes:

- ^{a} Found in all species except fungi
- ^{b} May or may not be present in any species
- ^{c} Found in fungal species such as Schizosaccharomyces pombe
- ^{d} Recent research has described NDUFA4 to be a subunit of complex IV, and not of complex I

== Inhibitors ==
Inhibition of complex I is the mode of action of the METI acaricides and insecticides: fenazaquin, fenpyroximate, pyrimidifen, pyridaben, tebufenpyrad, and tolfenpyrad. They are assigned to IRAC group 21A. Perhaps the best-known inhibitor of complex I is rotenone, which is used as a piscicide and previously commonly used as an organic pesticide, but now banned in many countries. It is in IRAC group 21B. Rotenone and rotenoids are isoflavonoids occurring in several genera of tropical plants such as Antonia (Loganiaceae), Derris and Lonchocarpus (Faboideae, Fabaceae). There have been reports of the indigenous people of French Guiana using rotenone-containing plants to fish - due to its ichthyotoxic effect - as early as the 17th century. Rotenone binds to the ubiquinone binding site of complex I as well as piericidin A, another potent inhibitor with a close structural homologue to ubiquinone.

Acetogenins from Annonaceae are even more potent inhibitors of complex I. Rolliniastatin-2, an acetogenin, is the first complex I inhibitor found that does not share the same binding site as rotenone. Bullatacin (an acetogenin found in Asimina triloba fruit) is the most potent known inhibitor of NADH dehydrogenase (ubiquinone) (IC_{50}=1.2 nM, stronger than rotenone).

Despite more than 50 years of study of complex I, no inhibitors blocking the electron flow inside the enzyme have been found. Hydrophobic inhibitors like rotenone or piericidin most likely disrupt the electron transfer between the terminal FeS cluster N2 and ubiquinone. It has been shown that long-term systemic inhibition of complex I by rotenone can induce selective degeneration of dopaminergic neurons.

Complex I is also blocked by adenosine diphosphate ribose – a reversible competitive inhibitor of NADH oxidation – by binding to the enzyme at the nucleotide binding site. Both hydrophilic NADH and hydrophobic ubiquinone analogs act at the beginning and the end of the internal electron-transport pathway, respectively.

The antidiabetic drug Metformin has been shown to induce a mild and transient inhibition of the mitochondrial respiratory chain complex I, and this inhibition appears to play a key role in its mechanism of action.

Inhibition of complex I has been implicated in hepatotoxicity associated with a variety of drugs, for instance flutamide and nefazodone. Further, complex I inhibition was shown to trigger NAD^{+}-independent glucose catabolism.

== Active/inactive transition ==
The catalytic properties of eukaryotic complex I are not simple. Two catalytically and structurally distinct forms exist in any given preparation of the enzyme: one is the fully competent, so-called "active" A-form and the other is the catalytically silent, dormant, "inactive", D-form. After exposure of idle enzyme to elevated, but physiological temperatures (>30 °C) in the absence of substrate, the enzyme converts to the D-form. This form is catalytically incompetent but can be activated by the slow reaction (k~4 min^{−1}) of NADH oxidation with subsequent ubiquinone reduction. After one or several turnovers the enzyme becomes active and can catalyse physiological NADH:ubiquinone reaction at a much higher rate (k~10^{4} min^{−1}). In the presence of divalent cations (Mg^{2+}, Ca^{2+}), or at alkaline pH the activation takes much longer.

The high activation energy (270 kJ/mol) of the deactivation process indicates the occurrence of major conformational changes in the organisation of the complex I. However, until now, the only conformational difference observed between these two forms is the number of cysteine residues exposed at the surface of the enzyme. Treatment of the D-form of complex I with the sulfhydryl reagents N-Ethylmaleimide or DTNB irreversibly blocks critical cysteine residues, abolishing the ability of the enzyme to respond to activation, thus inactivating it irreversibly. The A-form of complex I is insensitive to sulfhydryl reagents.

It was found that these conformational changes may have a very important physiological significance. The inactive, but not the active form of complex I was susceptible to inhibition by nitrosothiols and peroxynitrite. It is likely that transition from the active to the inactive form of complex I takes place during pathological conditions when the turnover of the enzyme is limited at physiological temperatures, such as during hypoxia, ischemia or when the tissue nitric oxide:oxygen ratio increases (i.e. metabolic hypoxia).

== Production of superoxide ==
Recent investigations suggest that complex I is a potent source of reactive oxygen species. Complex I can produce superoxide (as well as hydrogen peroxide), through at least two different pathways. During forward electron transfer, only very small amounts of superoxide are produced (probably less than 0.1% of the overall electron flow).

During reverse electron transfer, complex I might be the most important site of superoxide production within mitochondria, with around 3-4% of electrons being diverted to superoxide formation. Reverse electron transfer, the process by which electrons from the reduced ubiquinol pool (supplied by succinate dehydrogenase, glycerol-3-phosphate dehydrogenase, electron-transferring flavoprotein or dihydroorotate dehydrogenase in mammalian mitochondria) pass through complex I to reduce NAD^{+} to NADH, driven by the inner mitochondrial membrane potential electric potential. Although it is not precisely known under what pathological conditions reverse-electron transfer would occur in vivo, in vitro experiments indicate that this process can be a very potent source of superoxide when succinate concentrations are high and oxaloacetate or malate concentrations are low. This can take place during tissue ischaemia, when oxygen delivery is blocked.

Superoxide is a reactive oxygen species that contributes to cellular oxidative stress and is linked to neuromuscular diseases and aging. NADH dehydrogenase produces superoxide by transferring one electron from FMNH_{2} (or semireduced flavin) to oxygen (O_{2}). The radical flavin leftover is unstable, and transfers the remaining electron to the iron-sulfur centers. It is the ratio of NADH to NAD^{+} that determines the rate of superoxide formation.

== Pathology ==
Mutations in the subunits of complex I can cause mitochondrial diseases, including Leigh syndrome. Point mutations in various complex I subunits derived from mitochondrial DNA (mtDNA) can also result in Leber's Hereditary Optic Neuropathy.There is some evidence that complex I defects may play a role in the etiology of Parkinson's disease, perhaps because of reactive oxygen species (complex I can, like complex III, leak electrons to oxygen, forming highly toxic superoxide).

Although the exact etiology of Parkinson's disease is unclear, it is likely that mitochondrial dysfunction, along with proteasome inhibition and environmental toxins, may play a large role. In fact, the inhibition of complex I has been shown to cause the production of peroxides and a decrease in proteasome activity, which may lead to Parkinson's disease. Additionally, Esteves et al. (2010) found that cell lines with Parkinson's disease show increased proton leakage in complex I, which causes decreased maximum respiratory capacity.

Brain ischemia/reperfusion injury is mediated via complex I impairment. Recently it was found that oxygen deprivation leads to conditions in which mitochondrial complex I lose its natural cofactor, flavin mononucleotide (FMN) and become inactive. When oxygen is present the enzyme catalyzes a physiological reaction of NADH oxidation by ubiquinone, supplying electrons downstream of the respiratory chain (complexes III and IV). Ischemia leads to dramatic increase of succinate level. In the presence of succinate mitochondria catalyze reverse electron transfer so that fraction of electrons from succinate is directed upstream to FMN of complex I. Reverse electron transfer results in a reduction of complex I FMN, increased generation of ROS, followed by a loss of the reduced cofactor (FMNH_{2}) and impairment of mitochondria energy production. The FMN loss by complex I and I/R injury can be alleviated by the administration of FMN precursor, riboflavin.

Recent studies have examined other roles of complex I activity in the brain. Andreazza et al. (2010) found that the level of complex I activity was significantly decreased in patients with bipolar disorder, but not in patients with depression or schizophrenia. They found that patients with bipolar disorder showed increased protein oxidation and nitration in their prefrontal cortex. These results suggest that future studies should target complex I for potential therapeutic studies for bipolar disorder. Similarly, Moran et al. (2010) found that patients with severe complex I deficiency showed decreased oxygen consumption rates and slower growth rates. However, they found that mutations in different genes in complex I lead to different phenotypes, thereby explaining the variations of pathophysiological manifestations of complex I deficiency.

Exposure to pesticides can also inhibit complex I and cause disease symptoms. For example, chronic exposure to low levels of dichlorvos, an organophosphate used as a pesticide, has been shown to cause liver dysfunction. This occurs because dichlorvos alters complex I and II activity levels, which leads to decreased mitochondrial electron transfer activities and decreased ATP synthesis.

== In chloroplasts ==
A proton-pumping, ubiquinone-using NADH dehydrogenase complex, homologous to complex I, is found in the chloroplast genomes of most land plants under the name ndh. This complex is inherited from the original symbiosis from cyanobacteria, but has been lost in most eukaryotic algae, some gymnosperms (Pinus and gnetophytes), and some very young lineages of angiosperms. The purpose of this complex is originally cryptic as chloroplasts do not participate in respiration, but now it is known that ndh serves to maintain photosynthesis in stressful situations. This makes it at least partially dispensable in favorable conditions. It is evident that angiosperm lineages without ndh do not last long from their young ages, but how gymnosperms survive on land without ndh for so long is unknown.

== Genes ==
The following is a list of humans genes that encode for Complex I subunits and assembly factors:

- NADH dehydrogenase (ubiquinone) 1 alpha subcomplex
  - NDUFA1 – NADH dehydrogenase (ubiquinone) 1 alpha subcomplex, 1, 7.5kDa
  - NDUFA2 – NADH dehydrogenase (ubiquinone) 1 alpha subcomplex, 2, 8kDa
  - NDUFA3 – NADH dehydrogenase (ubiquinone) 1 alpha subcomplex, 3, 9kDa
  - NDUFA5 – NADH dehydrogenase (ubiquinone) 1 alpha subcomplex, 5, 13kDa
  - NDUFA6 – NADH dehydrogenase (ubiquinone) 1 alpha subcomplex, 6, 14kDa
  - NDUFA7 – NADH dehydrogenase (ubiquinone) 1 alpha subcomplex, 7, 14.5kDa
  - NDUFA8 – NADH dehydrogenase (ubiquinone) 1 alpha subcomplex, 8, 19kDa
  - NDUFA9 – NADH dehydrogenase (ubiquinone) 1 alpha subcomplex, 9, 39kDa
  - NDUFA10 – NADH dehydrogenase (ubiquinone) 1 alpha subcomplex, 10, 42kDa
  - NDUFA11 – NADH dehydrogenase (ubiquinone) 1 alpha subcomplex, 11, 14.7kDa
  - NDUFA12 – NADH dehydrogenase (ubiquinone) 1 alpha subcomplex, 12
  - NDUFA13 – NADH dehydrogenase (ubiquinone) 1 alpha subcomplex, 13
  - NDUFAB1 – NADH dehydrogenase (ubiquinone) 1, alpha/beta subcomplex, 1, 8kDa
  - NDUFAF1 – NADH dehydrogenase (ubiquinone) 1 alpha subcomplex, assembly factor 1
  - NDUFAF2 – NADH dehydrogenase (ubiquinone) 1 alpha subcomplex, assembly factor 2
  - NDUFAF3 – NADH dehydrogenase (ubiquinone) 1 alpha subcomplex, assembly factor 3
  - NDUFAF4 – NADH dehydrogenase (ubiquinone) 1 alpha subcomplex, assembly factor 4
- NADH dehydrogenase (ubiquinone) 1 beta subcomplex
  - NDUFB1 – NADH dehydrogenase (ubiquinone) 1 beta subcomplex, 1, 7kDa
  - NDUFB2 – NADH dehydrogenase (ubiquinone) 1 beta subcomplex, 2, 8kDa
  - NDUFB3 – NADH dehydrogenase (ubiquinone) 1 beta subcomplex, 3, 12kDa
  - NDUFB4 – NADH dehydrogenase (ubiquinone) 1 beta subcomplex, 4, 15kDa
  - NDUFB5 – NADH dehydrogenase (ubiquinone) 1 beta subcomplex, 5, 16kDa
  - NDUFB6 – NADH dehydrogenase (ubiquinone) 1 beta subcomplex, 6, 17kDa
  - NDUFB7 – NADH dehydrogenase (ubiquinone) 1 beta subcomplex, 7, 18kDa
  - NDUFB8 – NADH dehydrogenase (ubiquinone) 1 beta subcomplex, 8, 19kDa
  - NDUFB9 – NADH dehydrogenase (ubiquinone) 1 beta subcomplex, 9, 22kDa
  - NDUFB10 – NADH dehydrogenase (ubiquinone) 1 beta subcomplex, 10, 22kDa
  - NDUFB11 – NADH dehydrogenase (ubiquinone) 1 beta subcomplex, 11, 17.3kDa
- NADH dehydrogenase (ubiquinone) 1, subcomplex unknown
  - NDUFC1 – NADH dehydrogenase (ubiquinone) 1, subcomplex unknown, 1, 6kDa
  - NDUFC2 – NADH dehydrogenase (ubiquinone) 1, subcomplex unknown, 2, 14.5kDa
- NADH dehydrogenase (ubiquinone) Fe-S protein
  - NDUFS1 – NADH dehydrogenase (ubiquinone) Fe-S protein 1, 75kDa (NADH-coenzyme Q reductase)
  - NDUFS2 – NADH dehydrogenase (ubiquinone) Fe-S protein 2, 49kDa (NADH-coenzyme Q reductase)
  - NDUFS3 – NADH dehydrogenase (ubiquinone) Fe-S protein 3, 30kDa (NADH-coenzyme Q reductase)
  - NDUFS4 – NADH dehydrogenase (ubiquinone) Fe-S protein 4, 18kDa (NADH-coenzyme Q reductase)
  - NDUFS5 – NADH dehydrogenase (ubiquinone) Fe-S protein 5, 15kDa (NADH-coenzyme Q reductase)
  - NDUFS6 – NADH dehydrogenase (ubiquinone) Fe-S protein 6, 13kDa (NADH-coenzyme Q reductase)
  - NDUFS7 – NADH dehydrogenase (ubiquinone) Fe-S protein 7, 20kDa (NADH-coenzyme Q reductase)
  - NDUFS8 – NADH dehydrogenase (ubiquinone) Fe-S protein 8, 23kDa (NADH-coenzyme Q reductase)
- NADH dehydrogenase (ubiquinone) flavoprotein 1
  - NDUFV1 – NADH dehydrogenase (ubiquinone) flavoprotein 1, 51kDa
  - NDUFV2 – NADH dehydrogenase (ubiquinone) flavoprotein 2, 24kDa
  - NDUFV3 – NADH dehydrogenase (ubiquinone) flavoprotein 3, 10kDa
- mitochondrially encoded NADH dehydrogenase subunit
  - MT-ND1 - mitochondrially encoded NADH dehydrogenase subunit 1
  - MT-ND2 - mitochondrially encoded NADH dehydrogenase subunit 2
  - MT-ND3 - mitochondrially encoded NADH dehydrogenase subunit 3
  - MT-ND4 - mitochondrially encoded NADH dehydrogenase subunit 4
  - MT-ND4L - mitochondrially encoded NADH dehydrogenase subunit 4L
  - MT-ND5 - mitochondrially encoded NADH dehydrogenase subunit 5
  - MT-ND6 - mitochondrially encoded NADH dehydrogenase subunit 6
