= NADH dehydrogenase (ubiquinone) 1 alpha subcomplex subunit 7 =

CI-B14_5a

Identifiers
- Symbol: CI-B14_5a
- Pfam: PF07347
- InterPro: IPR009947
Available protein structures:
- Pfam: structures / ECOD
- PDB: RCSB PDB; PDBe; PDBj
- PDBsum: structure summary

In molecular biology, the NADH dehydrogenase (ubiquinone) 1 alpha subcomplex subunit 7 family of proteins (also known as NADH-ubiquinone oxidoreductase subunit B14.5a or Complex I-B14.5a) form a part of NADH dehydrogenase (complex I). In mammals, it is encoded by the NDUFA7 gene.
