= COXFA4L3 =

Protein-coding gene in the species Homo sapiens

Identifiers
- Aliases: COXFA4L3, FOAP-11, NMES1, chromosome 15 open reading frame 48, MIR147BHG, MISTRAV, MOCCI, C15orf48, Cytochrome C Oxidase Associated Subunit FA4L3
- External IDs: OMIM: 608409; MGI: 3034182; GeneCards: COXFA4L3

Gene location (Human)
Chr.	Chromosome 15 (human)
Band	15q21.1	Start	45,430,579 bp
Band	15q21.1	End	45,448,761 bp

Gene location (Mouse)
Chr.	Chromosome 2 (mouse)
Band	2|2 E5	Start	122,478,906 bp
Band	2|2 E5	End	122,483,111 bp
RNA expression pattern
Bgee	Human / Mouse (ortholog); Top expressed in: mucosa of transverse colon; rectum; right testis; left testis; appendix; islet of Langerhans; duodenum; skin of abdomen; placenta; skin of leg / Top expressed in: blastocyst; ileum; granulocyte; duodenum; spermatocyte; jejunum; testicle; spermatid; colon; stomach; More reference expression data
BioGPS	n/a
Gene ontology
Molecular function	cytochrome-c oxidase activity; protein binding
Cellular component	nucleus; mitochondrial respiratory chain complex IV; membrane; integral component of membrane
Biological process	proton transmembrane transport; electron transport chain; response to bacterium
Sources:Amigo / QuickGO
Orthologs
Databases	NCBI: entry; OMA: entry
Species	Human	Mouse
Entrez	84419	433470
Ensembl	ENSG00000166920	ENSMUSG00000033213
UniProt	Q9C002	Q810Q5
RefSeq (mRNA)	NM_197955; NM_032413	NM_001004174
RefSeq (protein)	NP_115789; NP_922946; NP_115789.1; NP_922946.1	NP_001004174
Location (UCSC)	Chr 15: 45.43 – 45.45 Mb	Chr 2: 122.48 – 122.48 Mb
PubMed search
- Wikidata
View/Edit Human	View/Edit Mouse

Cytochrome c oxidase associated subunit FA4L3 is a protein that in humans is encoded by the gene COXFA4L3 (previously C15orf48). It participates in an immunoregulatory response. More specifically, in response to inflammation signaling, the protein COXFA4L3 replaces the COXFA4 subunit in Cytochrome c oxidase, reducing cellular respiration in the mitochondria.

== Function ==
This gene was first identified in a study of human esophageal squamous cell carcinoma tissues. Levels of both the message and protein are reduced in carcinoma samples. In adult human tissues, this gene is expressed in the esophagus, stomach, small intestine, colon and placenta. Alternatively spliced transcript variants that encode the same protein have been identified.
