= NDUFB1 =

Protein-coding gene in the species Homo sapiens

Identifiers
- Aliases: NDUFB1, CI-MNLL, CI-SGDH, MNLL, NADH:ubiquinone oxidoreductase subunit B1
- External IDs: OMIM: 603837; GeneCards: NDUFB1

Gene location (Human)
Chr.	Chromosome 14 (human)
Band	14q32.12	Start	92,116,122 bp
Band	14q32.12	End	92,121,917 bp
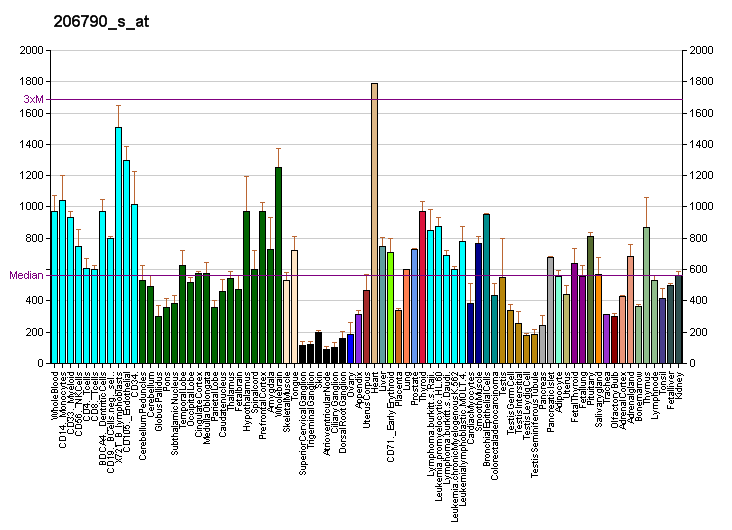
RNA expression pattern
Bgee	Human / Mouse (ortholog); Top expressed in: left ventricle; apex of heart; right auricle of heart; right ventricle; renal medulla; anterior pituitary; endothelial cell; left adrenal cortex; mucosa of transverse colon; body of tongue / n/a; More reference expression data
BioGPS	More reference expression data
Gene ontology
Molecular function	NADH dehydrogenase (ubiquinone) activity; NADH dehydrogenase activity
Cellular component	integral component of membrane; mitochondrial inner membrane; mitochondrial respiratory chain complex I; respirasome; membrane; mitochondrion; nuclear speck
Biological process	mitochondrial electron transport, NADH to ubiquinone; mitochondrial respiratory chain complex I assembly
Sources:Amigo / QuickGO
Orthologs
Databases	NCBI: entry; OMA: entry
Species	Human	Mouse
Entrez	4707	102631912
Ensembl	ENSG00000183648	n/a
UniProt	O75438	n/a
RefSeq (mRNA)	NM_004545	n/a
RefSeq (protein)	NP_004536	n/a
Location (UCSC)	Chr 14: 92.12 – 92.12 Mb	n/a
PubMed search
- Wikidata
View/Edit Human	View/Edit Mouse

NADH dehydrogenase [ubiquinone] 1 beta subcomplex subunit 1 is an enzyme that in humans is encoded by the NDUFB1 gene. NADH dehydrogenase (ubiquinone) 1 beta subcomplex, 1, 7kDa is an accessory subunit of the NADH dehydrogenase (ubiquinone) complex, located in the mitochondrial inner membrane. It is also known as Complex I and is the largest of the five complexes of the electron transport chain.

== Structure ==
The NDUFB1 gene, located on the q arm of chromosome 14 in position 32.12, is 5,687 base pairs long. The NDUFB1 protein weighs 7 kDa and is composed of 58 amino acids. NDUFB1 is a subunit of the enzyme NADH dehydrogenase (ubiquinone), the largest of the respiratory complexes. The structure is L-shaped with a long, hydrophobic transmembrane domain and a hydrophilic domain for the peripheral arm that includes all the known redox centers and the NADH binding site. NDUFB1 is one of about 31 hydrophobic subunits that form the transmembrane region of Complex I. It has been noted that the N-terminal hydrophobic domain has the potential to be folded into an alpha helix spanning the inner mitochondrial membrane with a C-terminal hydrophilic domain interacting with globular subunits of Complex I. The highly conserved two-domain structure suggests that this feature is critical for the protein function and that the hydrophobic domain acts as an anchor for the NADH dehydrogenase (ubiquinone) complex at the inner mitochondrial membrane.

== Function ==
The human NDUFB1 gene codes for a subunit of Complex I of the respiratory chain, which transfers electrons from NADH to ubiquinone. However, NDUFB1 is an accessory subunit of the complex that is believed not to be involved in catalysis. Initially, NADH binds to Complex I and transfers two electrons to the isoalloxazine ring of the flavin mononucleotide (FMN) prosthetic arm to form FMNH_{2}. The electrons are transferred through a series of iron-sulfur (Fe-S) clusters in the prosthetic arm and finally to coenzyme Q10 (CoQ), which is reduced to ubiquinol (CoQH_{2}). The flow of electrons changes the redox state of the protein, resulting in a conformational change and pK shift of the ionizable side chain, which pumps four hydrogen ions out of the mitochondrial matrix.
