= NDUFB6 =

Protein-coding gene in the species Homo sapiens

Identifiers
- Aliases: NDUFB6, B17, CI, NADH:ubiquinone oxidoreductase subunit B6
- External IDs: OMIM: 603322; MGI: 2684983; GeneCards: NDUFB6

Gene location (Human)
Chr.	Chromosome 9 (human)
Band	9p21.1	Start	32,553,001 bp
Band	9p21.1	End	32,573,184 bp

Gene location (Mouse)
Chr.	Chromosome 4 (mouse)
Band	4|4 A5	Start	40,270,591 bp
Band	4|4 A5	End	40,279,421 bp
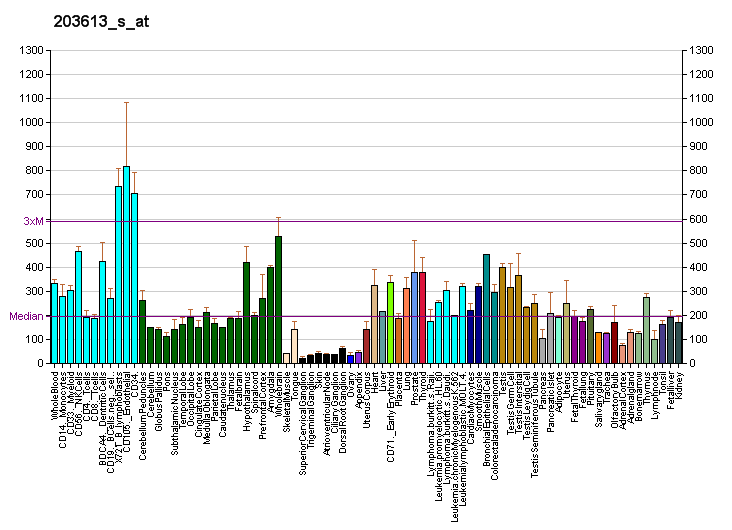
RNA expression pattern
Bgee	Human / Mouse (ortholog); Top expressed in: right ventricle; myocardium of left ventricle; biceps brachii; Skeletal muscle tissue of biceps brachii; thoracic diaphragm; body of tongue; triceps brachii muscle; gingival epithelium; Skeletal muscle tissue of rectus abdominis; jejunal mucosa / Top expressed in: intercostal muscle; external carotid artery; brown adipose tissue; facial motor nucleus; atrium; tunica adventitia of aorta; vas deferens; internal carotid artery; Epithelium of choroid plexus; soleus muscle; More reference expression data
BioGPS	More reference expression data
Gene ontology
Molecular function	NADH dehydrogenase (ubiquinone) activity
Cellular component	integral component of membrane; respirasome; mitochondrial membranes; membrane; nucleoplasm; mitochondrial inner membrane; mitochondrion; mitochondrial respiratory chain complex I
Biological process	mitochondrial electron transport, NADH to ubiquinone; mitochondrial ATP synthesis coupled electron transport; mitochondrial respiratory chain complex I assembly
Sources:Amigo / QuickGO
Orthologs
Databases	NCBI: entry; OMA: entry
Species	Human	Mouse
Entrez	4712	230075
Ensembl	ENSG00000165264	ENSMUSG00000071014
UniProt	O95139	Q3UIU2
RefSeq (mRNA)	NM_182739; NM_001199987; NM_002493	NM_001033305
RefSeq (protein)	NP_001186916; NP_002484; NP_877416	NP_001028477
Location (UCSC)	Chr 9: 32.55 – 32.57 Mb	Chr 4: 40.27 – 40.28 Mb
PubMed search
- Wikidata
View/Edit Human	View/Edit Mouse

NADH dehydrogenase [ubiquinone] 1 beta subcomplex subunit 6, also known as complex I-B17, is a protein that in humans is encoded by the NDUFB6 gene. NADH dehydrogenase (ubiquinone) 1 beta subcomplex subunit 6, is an accessory subunit of the NADH dehydrogenase (ubiquinone) complex, located in the mitochondrial inner membrane. It is also known as Complex I and is the largest of the five complexes of the electron transport chain.

== Gene ==
The NDUFB6 gene is located on the p arm of chromosome 9 in position 21.1 and is 19,659 base pairs long.

== Structure ==
The NDUFB6 protein weighs 15.5 kDa and is composed of 128 amino acids. NDUFB6 is a subunit of the enzyme NADH dehydrogenase (ubiquinone), the largest of the respiratory complexes. The structure is L-shaped with a long, hydrophobic transmembrane domain and a hydrophilic domain for the peripheral arm that includes all the known redox centers and the NADH binding site. It has been noted that the N-terminal hydrophobic domain has the potential to be folded into an alpha helix spanning the inner mitochondrial membrane with a C-terminal hydrophilic domain interacting with globular subunits of Complex I. The highly conserved two-domain structure suggests that this feature is critical for the protein function and that the hydrophobic domain acts as an anchor for the NADH dehydrogenase (ubiquinone) complex at the inner mitochondrial membrane.

== Function ==
The protein encoded by this gene is an accessory subunit of the multisubunit NADH:ubiquinone oxidoreductase (complex I) that is not directly involved in catalysis. However, NDUFB6 is required for electron transfer activity. Mammalian complex I is composed of 44 different subunits. It locates at the mitochondrial inner membrane. This protein complex has NADH dehydrogenase activity and oxidoreductase activity. It transfers electrons from NADH to the respiratory chain. The immediate electron acceptor for the enzyme is believed to be ubiquinone. Alternative splicing occurs at this locus and two transcript variants encoding distinct isoforms have been identified. Initially, NADH binds to Complex I and transfers two electrons to the isoalloxazine ring of the flavin mononucleotide (FMN) prosthetic arm to form FMNH_{2}. The electrons are transferred through a series of iron-sulfur (Fe-S) clusters in the prosthetic arm and finally to coenzyme Q10 (CoQ), which is reduced to ubiquinol (CoQH_{2}). The flow of electrons changes the redox state of the protein, resulting in a conformational change and pK shift of the ionizable side chain, which pumps four hydrogen ions out of the mitochondrial matrix.

== Clinical significance ==
Decreased expression of genes involved in oxidative phosphorylation, including NDUFB6, is associated with insulin resistance and type 2 diabetes. A polymorphism in the promoter region of the NDFUB6 gene resulting in an adenine to guanine shift at rs629566 was shown to create a DNA methylation site that is associated with a decline in NDUFB6 expression in muscle of aging patients.
