= NDUFA13 =

Protein-coding gene in the species Homo sapiens

Identifiers
- Aliases: NDUFA13, B16.6, CDA016, GRIM-19, GRIM19, CGI-39, NADH:ubiquinone oxidoreductase subunit A13, MC1DN28
- External IDs: OMIM: 609435; MGI: 1914434; GeneCards: NDUFA13

Gene location (Human)
Chr.	Chromosome 19 (human)
Band	19p13.11	Start	19,515,736 bp
Band	19p13.11	End	19,529,054 bp

Gene location (Mouse)
Chr.	Chromosome 8 (mouse)
Band	8|8 B3.3	Start	70,346,830 bp
Band	8|8 B3.3	End	70,355,208 bp
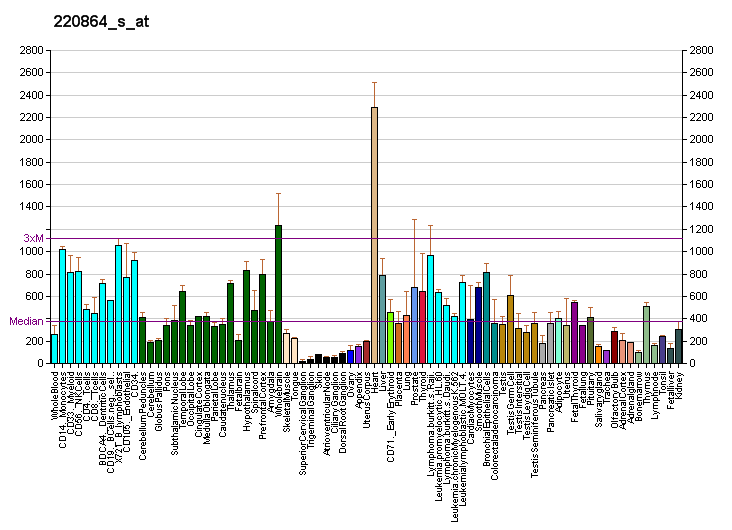
RNA expression pattern
Bgee	Human / Mouse (ortholog); Top expressed in: apex of heart; left ventricle; right auricle of heart; right testis; putamen; left testis; prefrontal cortex; caudate nucleus; nucleus accumbens; Brodmann area 9 / Top expressed in: interventricular septum; choroid plexus of fourth ventricle; right kidney; proximal tubule; gastrocnemius muscle; left ventricle; soleus muscle; quadriceps femoris muscle; thoracic diaphragm; tibialis anterior muscle; More reference expression data
BioGPS	More reference expression data
Gene ontology
Molecular function	NADH dehydrogenase (ubiquinone) activity; protein binding; ATP binding; NADH dehydrogenase activity
Cellular component	cytoplasm; integral component of membrane; mitochondrial membranes; membrane; nucleoplasm; mitochondrion; mitochondrial respirasome; mitochondrial inner membrane; respirasome; nucleus; mitochondrial respiratory chain complex I
Biological process	cellular response to retinoic acid; protein insertion into mitochondrial inner membrane; positive regulation of protein catabolic process; cellular response to interferon-beta; negative regulation of intrinsic apoptotic signaling pathway; reactive oxygen species metabolic process; positive regulation of peptidase activity; positive regulation of cysteine-type endopeptidase activity involved in apoptotic process; negative regulation of cell growth; apoptotic signaling pathway; negative regulation of transcription, DNA-templated; apoptotic process; extrinsic apoptotic signaling pathway; mitochondrial respiratory chain complex I assembly; mitochondrial electron transport, NADH to ubiquinone
Sources:Amigo / QuickGO
Orthologs
Databases	NCBI: entry; OMA: entry
Species	Human	Mouse
Entrez	51079	67184
Ensembl	ENSG00000186010	ENSMUSG00000036199
UniProt	Q9P0J0	Q9ERS2
RefSeq (mRNA)	NM_015965	NM_023312; NM_001382215
RefSeq (protein)	NP_057049	NP_075801.1; NP_075801
Location (UCSC)	Chr 19: 19.52 – 19.53 Mb	Chr 8: 70.35 – 70.36 Mb
PubMed search
- Wikidata
View/Edit Human	View/Edit Mouse

NADH dehydrogenase [ubiquinone] 1 alpha subcomplex subunit 13 is an enzyme that in humans is encoded by the NDUFA13 gene. The NDUFA13 protein is a subunit of NADH dehydrogenase (ubiquinone), which is located in the mitochondrial inner membrane and is the largest of the five complexes of the electron transport chain.

== Structure ==
The NDUFA13 gene is located on the p arm of chromosome 19 in position 13.2 and spans 11,995 base pairs. The gene produces a 17 kDa protein composed of 144 amino acids. NDUFA13 is a subunit of the enzyme NADH dehydrogenase (ubiquinone), the largest of the respiratory complexes. The structure is L-shaped with a long, hydrophobic transmembrane domain and a hydrophilic domain for the peripheral arm that includes all the known redox centers and the NADH binding site. It has been noted that the N-terminal hydrophobic domain has the potential to be folded into an alpha helix spanning the inner mitochondrial membrane with a C-terminal hydrophilic domain interacting with globular subunits of Complex I. The highly conserved two-domain structure suggests that this feature is critical for the protein function and that the hydrophobic domain acts as an anchor for the NADH dehydrogenase (ubiquinone) complex at the inner mitochondrial membrane. NDUFA13 is one of about 31 hydrophobic subunits that form the transmembrane region of Complex I, but it is an accessory subunit that is believed not to be involved in catalysis. The predicted secondary structure is primarily alpha helix, but the carboxy-terminal half of the protein has high potential to adopt a coiled-coil form. The amino-terminal part contains a putative beta sheet rich in hydrophobic amino acids that may serve as mitochondrial import signal.

== Function ==
The human NDUFA13 gene codes for a subunit of Complex I of the respiratory chain, which transfers electrons from NADH to ubiquinone. NADH binds to Complex I and transfers two electrons to the isoalloxazine ring of the flavin mononucleotide (FMN) prosthetic arm to form FMNH_{2}. The electrons are transferred through a series of iron-sulfur (Fe-S) clusters in the prosthetic arm and finally to coenzyme Q10 (CoQ), which is reduced to ubiquinol (CoQH_{2}). The flow of electrons changes the redox state of the protein, resulting in a conformational change and pK shift of the ionizable side chain, which pumps four hydrogen ions out of the mitochondrial matrix.

NDUFA13 has a homologous protein known as GRIM-19, a cell-death regulatory protein. It is involved in interferon/all-trans-retinoic acid (IFN/RA) induced cell death. This form of apoptotic activity is inhibited by interaction with viral IRF1. GRIM-19 prevents the transactivation of signal-transducer and activator of transcription 3 (STAT3) target genes but not other STAT family members.

== Clinical significance ==
The homologous protein to NDUFA13, GRIM-19, may play a role in Crohn's disease (CD), an inflammatory bowel disease (IBD) characterized by chronic inflammation of the intestinal epithelium. Its expression is decreased in the inflamed mucosa of patients with these diseases. Nucleotide-binding oligomerization domain-containing protein 2 (NOD2), also known as caspase recruitment domain-containing protein 15 (CARD15) or inflammatory bowel disease protein 1 (IBD1), functions as a mammalian cytosolic pathogen recognition molecule and plays an anti-bacterial role by limiting survival of intracellular invasive bacteria. GRIM-19 acts as a downstream anti-bacterial effector in CARD15-mediated innate mucosal responses by regulating intestinal epithelial cell responses to microbes. Following NOD2-mediated recognition of bacterial muramyl dipeptide, GRIM-19 is required for NF-κB activation, a key component in regulating the immune response to infection.

== Interactions ==
NDUFA13 has been shown to interact with STAT3.
