= NDUFC2 =

Protein-coding gene in the species Homo sapiens

Identifiers
- Aliases: NDUFC2, B14.5b, CI-B14.5b, HLC-1, NADHDH2, NADH:ubiquinone oxidoreductase subunit C2, MC1DN36
- External IDs: OMIM: 603845; MGI: 1344370; GeneCards: NDUFC2

Gene location (Human)
Chr.	Chromosome 11 (human)
Band	11q14.1	Start	78,068,297 bp
Band	11q14.1	End	78,079,862 bp

Gene location (Mouse)
Chr.	Chromosome 7 (mouse)
Band	7|7 E1	Start	97,049,210 bp
Band	7|7 E1	End	97,057,009 bp
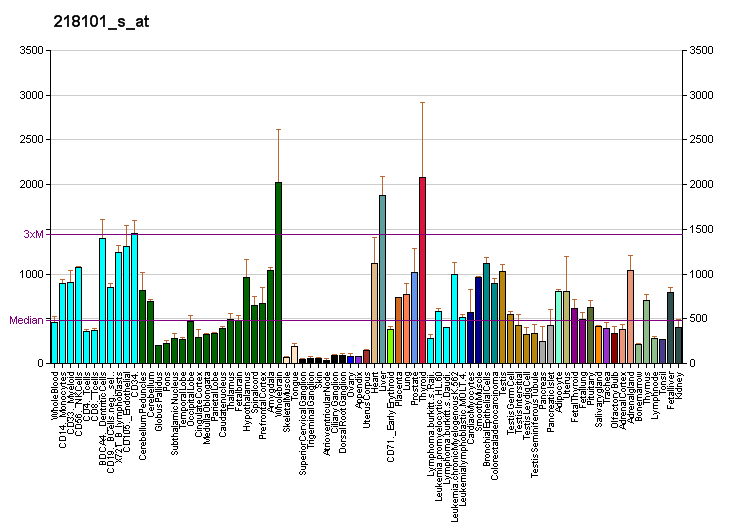
RNA expression pattern
Bgee	Human / Mouse (ortholog); Top expressed in: right adrenal gland; left adrenal cortex; right adrenal cortex; muscle of thigh; mucosa of transverse colon; olfactory zone of nasal mucosa; buccal mucosa cell; right lobe of thyroid gland; left lobe of thyroid gland; ganglionic eminence / Top expressed in: facial motor nucleus; atrioventricular valve; endocardial cushion; medial ganglionic eminence; anterior horn of spinal cord; intercostal muscle; digastric muscle; brown adipose tissue; lobe of cerebellum; mammillary body; More reference expression data
BioGPS	More reference expression data
Gene ontology
Molecular function	NADH dehydrogenase (ubiquinone) activity
Cellular component	cytoplasm; integral component of membrane; mitochondrial inner membrane; mitochondrial respiratory chain complex I; respirasome; membrane; mitochondrion; plasma membrane; azurophil granule membrane
Biological process	mitochondrial electron transport, NADH to ubiquinone; neutrophil degranulation; mitochondrial respiratory chain complex I assembly
Sources:Amigo / QuickGO
Orthologs
Databases	NCBI: entry; OMA: entry
Species	Human	Mouse
Entrez	4718	68197
Ensembl	ENSG00000151366	ENSMUSG00000030647
UniProt	O95298	Q9CQ54
RefSeq (mRNA)	NM_004549; NM_001204054; NM_001204055	NM_024220
RefSeq (protein)	NP_001190983; NP_001190984; NP_004540	NP_077182
Location (UCSC)	Chr 11: 78.07 – 78.08 Mb	Chr 7: 97.05 – 97.06 Mb
PubMed search
- Wikidata
View/Edit Human	View/Edit Mouse

NADH dehydrogenase [ubiquinone] 1 subunit C2 is an enzyme that in humans is encoded by the NDUFC2 gene.

The NDUFC2 gene encodes one of the subunits of complex I, the first and largest complex of the mitochondrial respiratory chain.
