= NDUFA10 =

Protein-coding gene in the species Homo sapiens

Identifiers
- Aliases: NDUFA10, CI-42KD, CI-42k, NADH:ubiquinone oxidoreductase subunit A10, MC1DN22
- External IDs: OMIM: 603835; MGI: 1914523; GeneCards: NDUFA10

Gene location (Human)
Chr.	Chromosome 2 (human)
Band	2q37.3	Start	239,892,450 bp
Band	2q37.3	End	240,025,743 bp

Gene location (Mouse)
Chr.	Chromosome 1 (mouse)
Band	1|1 D	Start	92,366,732 bp
Band	1|1 D	End	92,401,582 bp
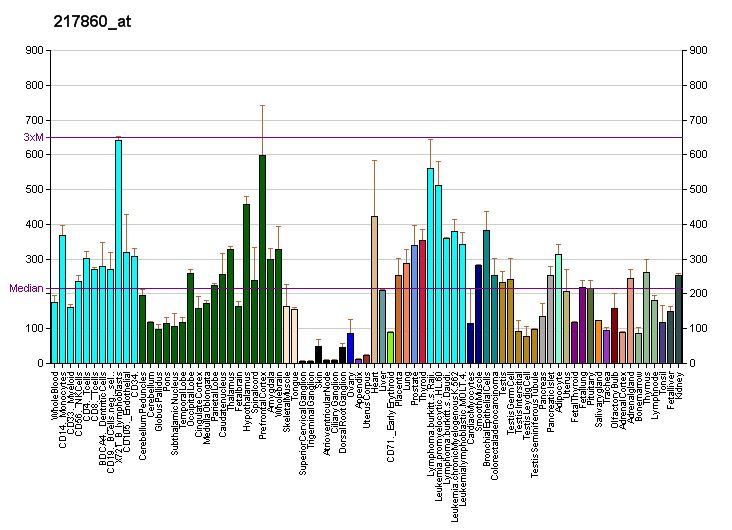
RNA expression pattern
Bgee	Human / Mouse (ortholog); Top expressed in: apex of heart; left ventricle; right auricle of heart; mucosa of transverse colon; right ventricle; right adrenal gland; left adrenal gland; left adrenal cortex; right adrenal cortex; rectum / Top expressed in: right ventricle; digastric muscle; sternocleidomastoid muscle; triceps brachii muscle; temporal muscle; right kidney; muscle of thigh; vastus lateralis muscle; facial motor nucleus; anterior horn of spinal cord; More reference expression data
BioGPS	More reference expression data
Gene ontology
Molecular function	NADH dehydrogenase (ubiquinone) activity
Cellular component	mitochondrial inner membrane; myelin sheath; mitochondrial matrix; respirasome; mitochondrion; mitochondrial respiratory chain complex I; cytoplasm
Biological process	mitochondrial electron transport, NADH to ubiquinone; mitochondrial respiratory chain complex I assembly
Sources:Amigo / QuickGO
Orthologs
Databases	NCBI: entry; OMA: entry
Species	Human	Mouse
Entrez	4705	67273
Ensembl	ENSG00000130414	ENSMUSG00000026260
UniProt	O95299	Q99LC3
RefSeq (mRNA)	NM_004544; NM_001322019; NM_001322020	NM_024197
RefSeq (protein)	NP_001308948; NP_001308949; NP_004535	NP_077159
Location (UCSC)	Chr 2: 239.89 – 240.03 Mb	Chr 1: 92.37 – 92.4 Mb
PubMed search
- Wikidata
View/Edit Human	View/Edit Mouse

NADH dehydrogenase [ubiquinone] 1 alpha subcomplex subunit 10 is an enzyme that in humans is encoded by the NDUFA10 gene. The NDUFA10 protein is a subunit of NADH dehydrogenase (ubiquinone), which is located in the mitochondrial inner membrane and is the largest of the five complexes of the electron transport chain. Mutations in subunits of NADH dehydrogenase (ubiquinone), also known as Complex I, frequently lead to complex neurodegenerative diseases such as Leigh's syndrome. Furthermore, reduced NDUFA10 expression levels due to FOXM1-directed hypermethylation are associated with human squamous cell carcinoma and may be related to other forms of cancer.

== Structure ==
The NDUFA10 gene is located on the q arm of chromosome 2 in position 37.3 and spans 68,031 base pairs. The gene produces a 41 kDa protein composed of 355 amino acids. NDUFA10 is a subunit of the enzyme NADH dehydrogenase (ubiquinone), the largest of the respiratory complexes. The structure is L-shaped with a long, hydrophobic transmembrane domain and a hydrophilic domain for the peripheral arm that includes all the known redox centers and the NADH binding site. It has been noted that the N-terminal hydrophobic domain has the potential to be folded into an alpha helix spanning the inner mitochondrial membrane with a C-terminal hydrophilic domain interacting with globular subunits of Complex I. The highly conserved two-domain structure suggests that this feature is critical for the protein function and that the hydrophobic domain acts as an anchor for the NADH dehydrogenase (ubiquinone) complex at the inner mitochondrial membrane. NDUFA10 is one of about 31 hydrophobic subunits that form the transmembrane region of Complex I, but it is an accessory subunit that is believed not to be involved in catalysis. The predicted secondary structure is primarily alpha helix, but the carboxy-terminal half of the protein has high potential to adopt a coiled-coil form. The amino-terminal part contains a putative beta sheet rich in hydrophobic amino acids that may serve as mitochondrial import signal.

== Function ==
The human NDUFA10 gene codes for a subunit of Complex I of the respiratory chain, which transfers electrons from NADH to ubiquinone. NADH binds to Complex I and transfers two electrons to the isoalloxazine ring of the flavin mononucleotide (FMN) prosthetic arm to form FMNH_{2}. The electrons are transferred through a series of iron-sulfur (Fe-S) clusters in the prosthetic arm and finally to coenzyme Q10 (CoQ), which is reduced to ubiquinol (CoQH_{2}). The flow of electrons changes the redox state of the protein, resulting in a conformational change and pK shift of the ionizable side chain, which pumps four hydrogen ions out of the mitochondrial matrix.

== Clinical significance ==
NDUFA10 demonstrated significantly downregulated mRNA expression levels in human squamous cell carcinoma, due to FOXM1-induced hypermethylation. FOXM1 is a known oncogene that has been implicated in all human cancer types. It operates by inhibiting tumor suppressor genes through promoter hypermethylation, among other mechanisms. Mutations in NDUFA10 have also been associated with Leigh disease resulting from complex I deficiency.

== Interactions ==
NDUFA10 has been shown to have 56 binary protein-protein interactions including 55 co-complex interactions. NDUFA10 appears to interact with RAB8A.
