= NDUFB4 =

Protein-coding gene in the species Homo sapiens

Identifiers
- Aliases: NDUFB4, B15, CI-B15, NADH:ubiquinone oxidoreductase subunit B4
- External IDs: OMIM: 603840; MGI: 3782046; GeneCards: NDUFB4

Gene location (Human)
Chr.	Chromosome 3 (human)
Band	3q13.33	Start	120,596,328 bp
Band	3q13.33	End	120,602,507 bp
RNA expression pattern
Bgee	Human / Mouse (ortholog); Top expressed in: right ventricle; biceps brachii; Skeletal muscle tissue of biceps brachii; Skeletal muscle tissue of rectus abdominis; body of tongue; thoracic diaphragm; triceps brachii muscle; vena cava; mucosa of sigmoid colon; cerebellar vermis / n/a; More reference expression data
BioGPS	n/a
Gene ontology
Molecular function	NADH dehydrogenase (ubiquinone) activity
Cellular component	integral component of membrane; mitochondrial inner membrane; mitochondrial respiratory chain complex I; respirasome; nuclear membrane; extracellular exosome; membrane; mitochondrion
Biological process	response to oxidative stress; mitochondrial electron transport, NADH to ubiquinone; mitochondrial respiratory chain complex I assembly
Sources:Amigo / QuickGO
Orthologs
Databases	NCBI: entry; OMA: entry
Species	Human	Mouse
Entrez	4710	100042503
Ensembl	ENSG00000065518	n/a
UniProt	O95168	Q9CQC7
RefSeq (mRNA)	NM_004547; NM_001168331	XM_001478443
RefSeq (protein)	NP_001161803; NP_004538	NP_080886
Location (UCSC)	Chr 3: 120.6 – 120.6 Mb	n/a
PubMed search
- Wikidata
View/Edit Human	View/Edit Mouse

NADH dehydrogenase (ubiquinone) 1 beta subcomplex, 4, 15kDa is a protein that in humans is encoded by the NDUFB4 gene. The NDUFB4 protein is a subunit of NADH dehydrogenase (ubiquinone), which is located in the mitochondrial inner membrane and is the largest of the five complexes of the electron transport chain.

== Structure ==
The NDUFB4 gene, located on the q arm of chromosome 3 in position 13.33, is 6,130 base pairs long. The NDUFB4 protein weighs 15 kDa and is composed of 129 amino acids. NDUFB4 is a subunit of the enzyme NADH dehydrogenase (ubiquinone), the largest of the respiratory complexes. The structure is L-shaped with a long, hydrophobic transmembrane domain and a hydrophilic domain for the peripheral arm that includes all the known redox centers and the NADH binding site. NDUFB4 is one of about 31 hydrophobic subunits that form the transmembrane region of Complex I and is of the non-catalytic subunits of the complex. It has been noted that the N-terminal hydrophobic domain has the potential to be folded into an alpha helix spanning the inner mitochondrial membrane with a C-terminal hydrophilic domain interacting with globular subunits of Complex I. The highly conserved two-domain structure suggests that this feature is critical for the protein function and that the hydrophobic domain acts as an anchor for the NADH dehydrogenase (ubiquinone) complex at the inner mitochondrial membrane.

== Function ==
The human NDUFB4 gene codes for a subunit of Complex I of the respiratory chain, which transfers electrons from NADH to ubiquinone. However, NDUFB4 is an accessory subunit of the complex that is believed not to be involved in catalysis. Mammalian complex I is composed of 45 different subunits. It locates at the mitochondrial inner membrane. This protein complex has NADH dehydrogenase activity and oxidoreductase activity. It transfers electrons from NADH to the respiratory chain. The immediate electron acceptor for the enzyme is believed to be ubiquinone. Initially, NADH binds to Complex I and transfers two electrons to the isoalloxazine ring of the flavin mononucleotide (FMN) prosthetic arm to form FMNH_{2}. The electrons are transferred through a series of iron-sulfur (Fe-S) clusters in the prosthetic arm and finally to coenzyme Q10 (CoQ), which is reduced to ubiquinol (CoQH_{2}). The flow of electrons changes the redox state of the protein, resulting in a conformational change and pK shift of the ionizable side chain, which pumps four hydrogen ions out of the mitochondrial matrix.
