= NDUFV3 =

Protein-coding gene in the species Homo sapiens

Identifiers
- Aliases: NDUFV3, CI-10k, CI-9KD, NADH:ubiquinone oxidoreductase subunit V3
- External IDs: OMIM: 602184; MGI: 1890894; GeneCards: NDUFV3

Gene location (Human)
Chr.	Chromosome 21 (human)
Band	21q22.3	Start	42,879,644 bp
Band	21q22.3	End	42,913,304 bp

Gene location (Mouse)
Chr.	Chromosome 17 (mouse)
Band	17|17 B1	Start	31,739,089 bp
Band	17|17 B1	End	31,750,305 bp
RNA expression pattern
Bgee	Human / Mouse (ortholog); Top expressed in: myocardium of left ventricle; right ventricle; cardiac muscle tissue of right atrium; tibialis anterior muscle; vastus lateralis muscle; biceps brachii; Skeletal muscle tissue of biceps brachii; deltoid muscle; body of tongue; parotid gland / Top expressed in: right ventricle; tunica adventitia of aorta; digastric muscle; aortic valve; sternocleidomastoid muscle; ascending aorta; internal carotid artery; triceps brachii muscle; epithelium of stomach; yolk sac; More reference expression data
BioGPS	n/a
Gene ontology
Molecular function	NADH dehydrogenase (ubiquinone) activity; RNA binding; protein binding
Cellular component	mitochondrial inner membrane; respirasome; membrane; mitochondrion; nucleoplasm; mitochondrial respiratory chain complex I
Biological process	mitochondrial electron transport, NADH to ubiquinone; mitochondrial respiratory chain complex I assembly; mitochondrial ATP synthesis coupled electron transport
Sources:Amigo / QuickGO
Orthologs
Databases	NCBI: entry; OMA: entry
Species	Human	Mouse
Entrez	4731	78330
Ensembl	ENSG00000160194	ENSMUSG00000024038
UniProt	P56181	Q8BK30
RefSeq (mRNA)	NM_001001503; NM_021075	NM_001083891; NM_030087
RefSeq (protein)	NP_001001503; NP_066553	NP_001077360; NP_084363
Location (UCSC)	Chr 21: 42.88 – 42.91 Mb	Chr 17: 31.74 – 31.75 Mb
PubMed search
- Wikidata
View/Edit Human	View/Edit Mouse

NADH dehydrogenase [ubiquinone] flavoprotein 3, mitochondrial is an enzyme that in humans is encoded by the NDUFV3 gene.

The protein encoded by this gene is one of at least forty-one subunits that make up the NADH-ubiquinone oxidoreductase complex. This complex is part of the mitochondrial respiratory chain and serves to catalyze the rotenone-sensitive oxidation of NADH and the reduction of ubiquinone. The encoded protein is one of three proteins found in the flavoprotein fraction of the complex. The specific function of the encoded protein is unknown. Two transcript variants encoding different isoforms have been found for this gene.
