= COXFA4L2 =

Protein-coding gene in humans

Identifiers
- Aliases: COXFA4L2, NUOMS, NADH dehydrogenase (ubiquinone) 1 alpha subcomplex, 4-like 2, NDUFA4, mitochondrial complex associated like 2, NDUFA4 mitochondrial complex associated like 2, MISTRH, NDUFA4L2
- External IDs: MGI: 3039567; GeneCards: COXFA4L2

Gene location (Human)
Chr.	Chromosome 12 (human)
Band	12q13.3	Start	57,234,903 bp
Band	12q13.3	End	57,240,715 bp

Gene location (Mouse)
Chr.	Chromosome 10 (mouse)
Band	10|10 D3	Start	127,350,836 bp
Band	10|10 D3	End	127,353,023 bp
RNA expression pattern
Bgee	Human / Mouse (ortholog); Top expressed in: right coronary artery; apex of heart; skin of abdomen; popliteal artery; tibial arteries; left coronary artery; skin of leg; right hemisphere of cerebellum; ascending aorta; right auricle of heart / Top expressed in: esophagus; umbilical cord; lip; calvaria; ankle; left lung lobe; seminiferous tubule; adrenal gland; skin of abdomen; muscle of thigh; More reference expression data
BioGPS	n/a
Gene ontology
Molecular function	cytochrome-c oxidase activity
Cellular component	mitochondrial respiratory chain complex IV
Biological process	proton transmembrane transport; electron transport chain
Sources:Amigo / QuickGO
Orthologs
Databases	NCBI: entry; OMA: entry
Species	Human	Mouse
Entrez	56901	407790
Ensembl	ENSG00000185633	ENSMUSG00000040280
UniProt	Q9NRX3	Q4FZG9
RefSeq (mRNA)	NM_020142; NM_001394960; NM_001394961	NM_001098789
RefSeq (protein)	NP_064527	NP_001092259
Location (UCSC)	Chr 12: 57.23 – 57.24 Mb	Chr 10: 127.35 – 127.35 Mb
PubMed search
- Wikidata
View/Edit Human	View/Edit Mouse

Cytochrome c oxidase hypoxia associated subunit FA4L2 is a protein that in humans is encoded by the COXFA4L2 gene (previously NDUFA4L2). COXFA4L2 is a mitochondrial protein that inhibits and regulates the electron transport chain, and is involved in the cellular response to hypoxia.

== Structure ==
The COXFA4L2 gene is located on the long q arm of chromosome 12 at position 13.3 and it spans 5,860 base pairs.

== See also ==
- COXFA4
