= NDUFA2 =

Protein-coding gene in the species Homo sapiens

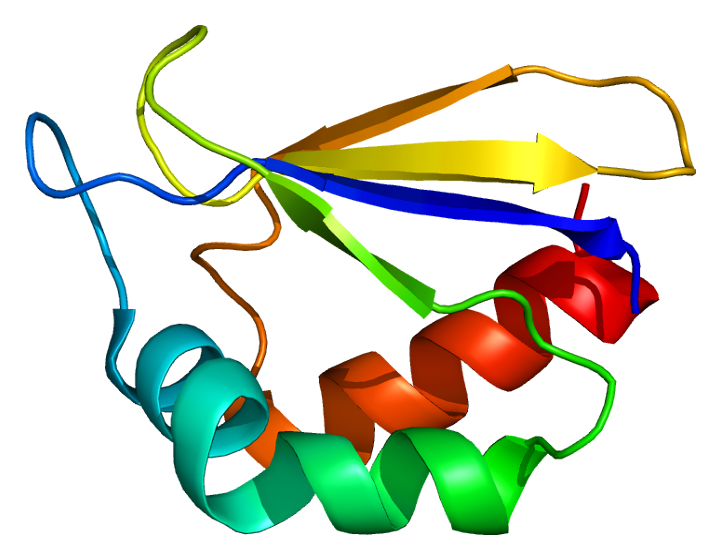

Identifiers
- Aliases: NDUFA2, B8, CD14, CIB8, NADH:ubiquinone oxidoreductase subunit A2, MC1DN13
- External IDs: OMIM: 602137; MGI: 1343103; GeneCards: NDUFA2
Available structures
PDB	Ortholog search: PDBe RCSB
PDB	List of PDB id codes 1S3A

Gene location (Human)
Chr.	Chromosome 5 (human)
Band	5q31.3	Start	140,638,740 bp
Band	5q31.3	End	140,647,771 bp

Gene location (Mouse)
Chr.	Chromosome 18 (mouse)
Band	18|18 B2	Start	36,875,385 bp
Band	18|18 B2	End	36,877,610 bp
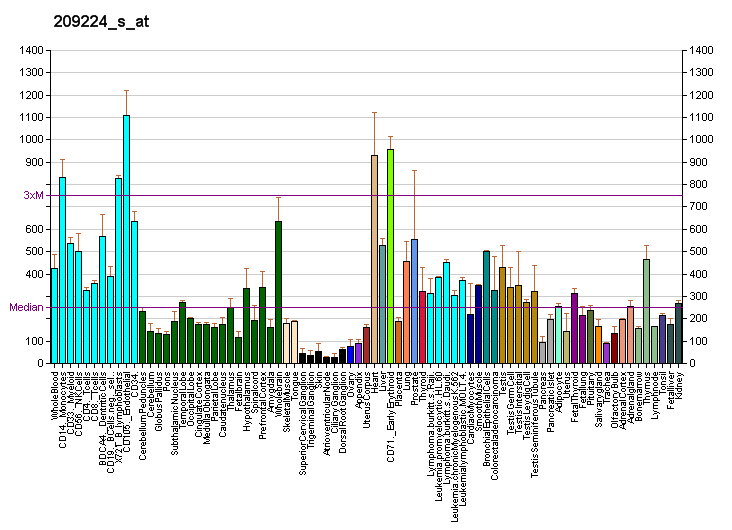
RNA expression pattern
Bgee	Human / Mouse (ortholog); Top expressed in: biceps brachii; right ventricle; Skeletal muscle tissue of biceps brachii; apex of heart; triceps brachii muscle; mucosa of transverse colon; vastus lateralis muscle; thoracic diaphragm; left ventricle; body of tongue / Top expressed in: aortic valve; fossa; facial motor nucleus; ascending aorta; medullary collecting duct; condyle; renal corpuscle; intercostal muscle; right kidney; Paneth cell; More reference expression data
BioGPS	More reference expression data
Gene ontology
Molecular function	NADH dehydrogenase (ubiquinone) activity
Cellular component	mitochondrial inner membrane; mitochondrial respiratory chain complex I; respirasome; membrane; mitochondrion; mitochondrial membranes
Biological process	mitochondrial respiratory chain complex I assembly; mitochondrial electron transport, NADH to ubiquinone; blastocyst hatching
Sources:Amigo / QuickGO
Orthologs
Databases	NCBI: entry; OMA: entry
Species	Human	Mouse
Entrez	4695	17991
Ensembl	ENSG00000131495	ENSMUSG00000014294
UniProt	O43678	Q9CQ75
RefSeq (mRNA)	NM_001185012; NM_002488	NM_010885
RefSeq (protein)	NP_001171941; NP_002479	NP_035015
Location (UCSC)	Chr 5: 140.64 – 140.65 Mb	Chr 18: 36.88 – 36.88 Mb
PubMed search
- Wikidata
View/Edit Human	View/Edit Mouse

NADH dehydrogenase [ubiquinone] 1 alpha subcomplex subunit 2 is a protein that in humans is encoded by the NDUFA2 gene. The NDUFA2 protein is a subunit of NADH dehydrogenase (ubiquinone), which is located in the mitochondrial inner membrane and is the largest of the five complexes of the electron transport chain. Mutations in the NDUFA2 gene are associated with Leigh's syndrome.

== Structure ==
The NDUFA2 gene is located on the long (q) arm of chromosome 5 at position 31.2 and it spans 2,422 base pairs. The NDUFA2 gene produces an 11 kDa protein composed of 99 amino acids. NDUFA2 is a subunit of the enzyme NADH dehydrogenase (ubiquinone), the largest of the respiratory complexes. The structure is L-shaped with a long, hydrophobic transmembrane domain and a hydrophilic domain for the peripheral arm that includes all the known redox centers and the NADH binding site. NDUFA2 is one of about 31 hydrophobic subunits that form the transmembrane region of Complex I. It has been noted that the N-terminal hydrophobic domain has the potential to be folded into an alpha helix spanning the inner mitochondrial membrane with a C-terminal hydrophilic domain interacting with globular subunits of Complex I. The highly conserved two-domain structure suggests that this feature is critical for the protein function and that the hydrophobic domain acts as an anchor for the NADH:ubiquinone oxidoreductase complex at the inner mitochondrial membrane.

== Function ==
The human NDUFA2 gene codes for a subunit of Complex I of the respiratory chain, which transfers electrons from NADH to ubiquinone. NDUFA2 is an accessory subunit of Complex I that is believed not to be involved in catalysis but may be involved in regulating Complex I activity or its assembly via assistance in redox processes. Initially, NADH binds to Complex I and transfers two electrons to the isoalloxazine ring of the flavin mononucleotide (FMN) prosthetic arm to form FMNH_{2}. The electrons are transferred through a series of iron-sulfur (Fe-S) clusters in the prosthetic arm and finally to coenzyme Q10 (CoQ), which is reduced to ubiquinol (CoQH_{2}). The flow of electrons changes the redox state of the protein, resulting in a conformational change and pK shift of the ionizable side chain, which pumps four hydrogen ions out of the mitochondrial matrix.

== Clinical significance ==
Mutations in the NDUFA2 gene can result in Leigh's syndrome, a severe neurological disorder that typically arises in the first year of life. One such mutation interferes with normal splicing patterns and results in exon 2 being skipped. This causes a reduction in Complex I activity and disturbs its assembly. The NDUFA2 mutation is also associated with the depolarization of the mitochondria.

== Interactions ==
NDUFA2 has many protein interactions, including interactions with other members of the NADH dehydrogenase [ubiquinone] 1 alpha subcomplex, other subunits of Complex I as well as with redox proteins. This may be due to its potential role in Complex I assembly and assistance in redox processes.
