= NDUFA12 =

Protein-coding gene in the species Homo sapiens

Identifiers
- Aliases: NDUFA12, B17.2, DAP13, NADH:ubiquinone oxidoreductase subunit A12, MC1DN23
- External IDs: OMIM: 614530; MGI: 1913664; GeneCards: NDUFA12

Gene location (Human)
Chr.	Chromosome 12 (human)
Band	12q22	Start	94,895,297 bp
Band	12q22	End	95,003,748 bp

Gene location (Mouse)
Chr.	Chromosome 10 (mouse)
Band	10|10 C2	Start	94,034,582 bp
Band	10|10 C2	End	94,057,305 bp
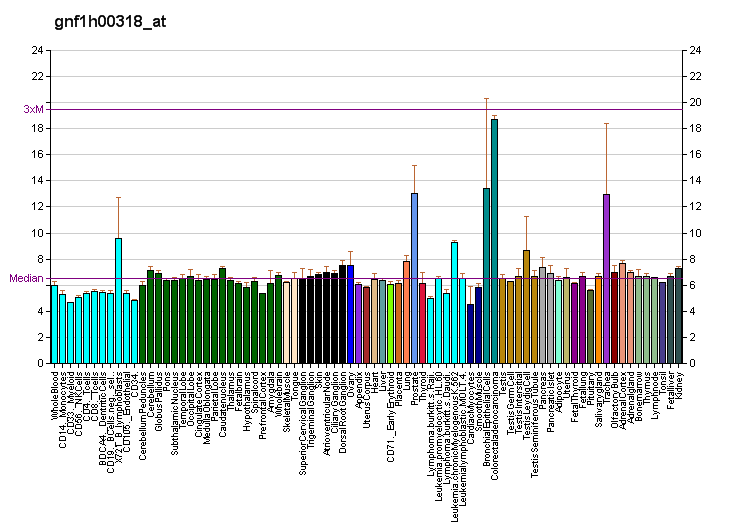

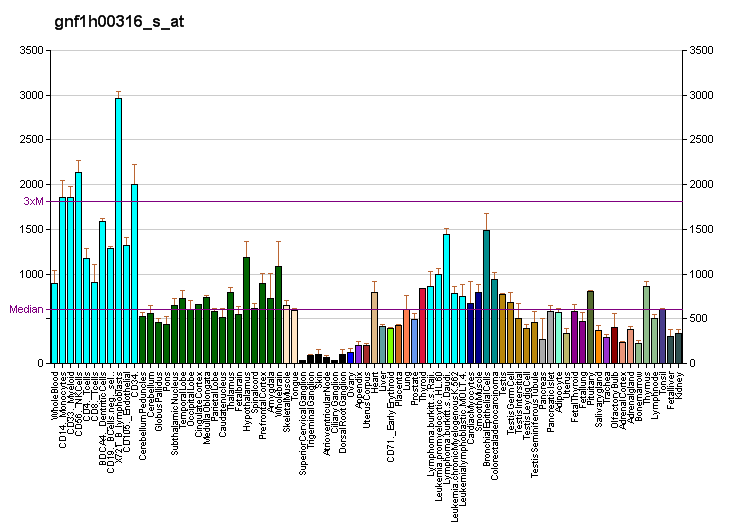

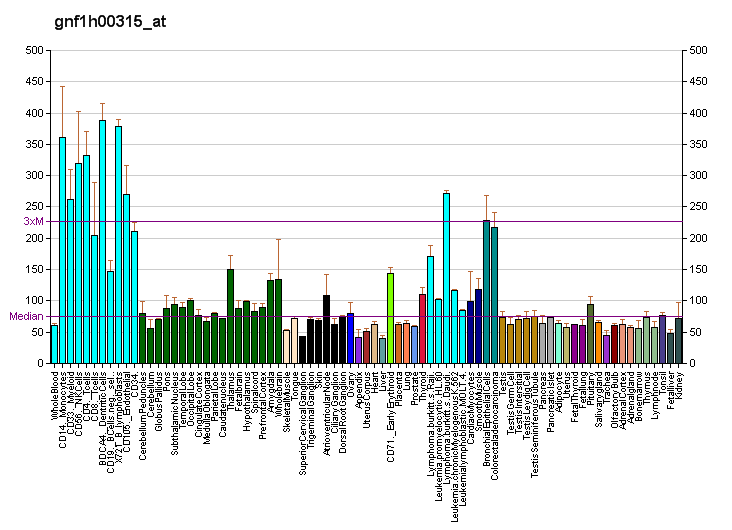
RNA expression pattern
Bgee	Human / Mouse (ortholog); Top expressed in: myocardium of left ventricle; tibialis anterior muscle; cardiac muscle tissue of right atrium; right ventricle; deltoid muscle; mucosa of ileum; vastus lateralis muscle; biceps brachii; muscle of thigh; Skeletal muscle tissue of rectus abdominis / Top expressed in: right kidney; quadriceps femoris muscle; proximal tubule; skeletal muscle tissue; yolk sac; muscle of thigh; neural tube; heart; stomach; striatum of neuraxis; More reference expression data
BioGPS	More reference expression data
Gene ontology
Molecular function	electron transfer activity; NADH dehydrogenase (ubiquinone) activity
Cellular component	respirasome; membrane; mitochondrial inner membrane; mitochondrion; cytosol; mitochondrial respiratory chain complex I
Biological process	response to oxidative stress; respiratory gaseous exchange by respiratory system; mitochondrial respiratory chain complex I assembly; mitochondrial ATP synthesis coupled electron transport; mitochondrial electron transport, NADH to ubiquinone
Sources:Amigo / QuickGO
Orthologs
Databases	NCBI: entry; OMA: entry
Species	Human	Mouse
Entrez	55967	66414
Ensembl	ENSG00000184752	ENSMUSG00000020022
UniProt	Q9UI09	Q7TMF3
RefSeq (mRNA)	NM_018838; NM_001258338	NM_025551; NM_001364691
RefSeq (protein)	NP_001245267; NP_061326	NP_079827; NP_001351620
Location (UCSC)	Chr 12: 94.9 – 95 Mb	Chr 10: 94.03 – 94.06 Mb
PubMed search
- Wikidata
View/Edit Human	View/Edit Mouse

NADH dehydrogenase [ubiquinone] 1 alpha subcomplex subunit 12 is an enzyme that in humans is encoded by the NDUFA12 gene. The NDUFA12 protein is a subunit of NADH dehydrogenase (ubiquinone), which is located in the mitochondrial inner membrane and is the largest of the five complexes of the electron transport chain. Mutations in subunits of NADH dehydrogenase (ubiquinone), also known as Complex I, frequently lead to complex neurodegenerative diseases such as Leigh's syndrome that result from mitochondrial complex I deficiency.

== Structure ==
The NDUFA12 gene is located on the q arm of chromosome 12 in position 22 and spans 32,386 base pairs. The gene produces a 17 kDa protein composed of 145 amino acids. NDUFA12 is a subunit of the enzyme NADH dehydrogenase (ubiquinone), the largest of the respiratory complexes. The structure is L-shaped with a long, hydrophobic transmembrane domain and a hydrophilic domain for the peripheral arm that includes all the known redox centers and the NADH binding site. It has been noted that the N-terminal hydrophobic domain has the potential to be folded into an alpha helix spanning the inner mitochondrial membrane with a C-terminal hydrophilic domain interacting with globular subunits of Complex I. The highly conserved two-domain structure suggests that this feature is critical for the protein function and that the hydrophobic domain acts as an anchor for the NADH dehydrogenase (ubiquinone) complex at the inner mitochondrial membrane. NDUFA12 is one of about 31 hydrophobic subunits that form the transmembrane region of Complex I, but it is an accessory subunit that is believed not to be involved in catalysis. The predicted secondary structure is primarily alpha helix, but the carboxy-terminal half of the protein has high potential to adopt a coiled-coil form. The amino-terminal part contains a putative beta sheet rich in hydrophobic amino acids that may serve as mitochondrial import signal.

== Function ==
The human NDUFA12 gene codes for a subunit of Complex I of the respiratory chain, which transfers electrons from NADH to ubiquinone. NADH binds to Complex I and transfers two electrons to the isoalloxazine ring of the flavin mononucleotide (FMN) prosthetic arm to form FMNH_{2}. The electrons are transferred through a series of iron-sulfur (Fe-S) clusters in the prosthetic arm and finally to coenzyme Q10 (CoQ), which is reduced to ubiquinol (CoQH_{2}). The flow of electrons changes the redox state of the protein, resulting in a conformational change and pK shift of the ionizable side chain, which pumps four hydrogen ions out of the mitochondrial matrix.

== Clinical significance ==
Mutations to NDUFA12 are not frequently found to cause complex I deficiency on their own. NDUFA12 is an accessory subunit and the complex can still be found assembled and enzymatically active in its absence, though in reduced amounts and activity. However, a cytosine to tyrosine mutation at position 178 that leads to a premature stop codon has been found in place of arginine at amino acid 60, leading to delayed early development, loss of motor abilities, and basal ganglia lesions typical of Leigh's syndrome.
