= NDUFB8 =

Protein-coding gene in the species Homo sapiens

Identifiers
- Aliases: NDUFB8, ASHI, CI-ASHI, NADH:ubiquinone oxidoreductase subunit B8, MC1DN32
- External IDs: OMIM: 602140; MGI: 1914514; GeneCards: NDUFB8

Gene location (Human)
Chr.	Chromosome 10 (human)
Band	10q24.31	Start	100,523,740 bp
Band	10q24.31	End	100,530,000 bp

Gene location (Mouse)
Chr.	Chromosome 19 (mouse)
Band	19|19 C3	Start	44,537,011 bp
Band	19|19 C3	End	44,543,879 bp
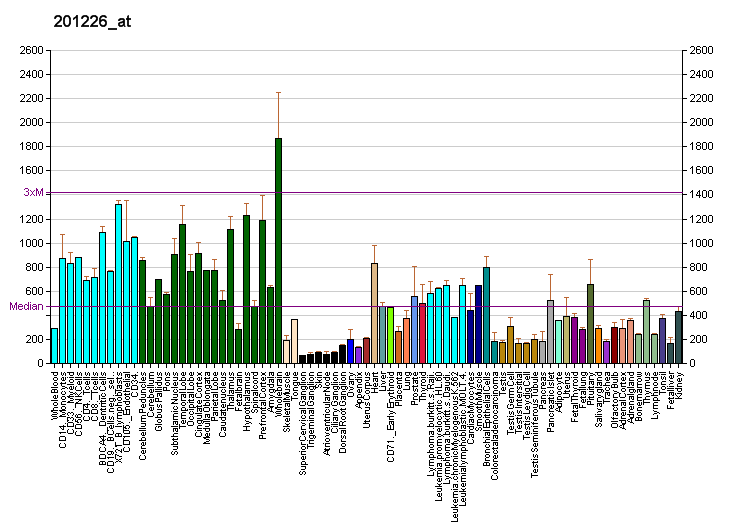

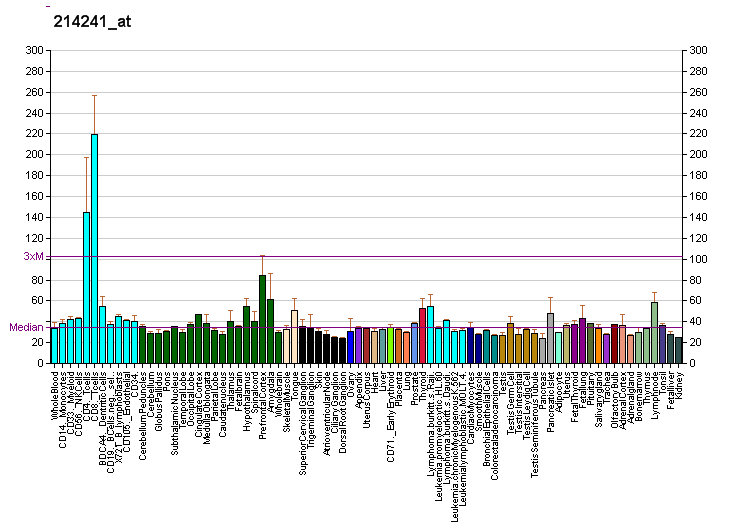

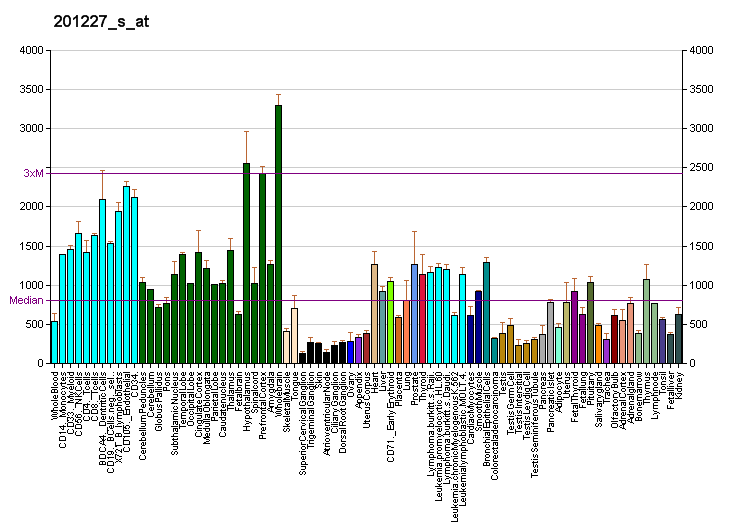
RNA expression pattern
Bgee	Human / Mouse (ortholog); Top expressed in: endothelial cell; lateral nuclear group of thalamus; Brodmann area 23; pons; Epithelium of choroid plexus; middle temporal gyrus; Brodmann area 9; superior vestibular nucleus; right frontal lobe; pars compacta / Top expressed in: right kidney; digastric muscle; sternocleidomastoid muscle; triceps brachii muscle; thoracic diaphragm; temporal muscle; intercostal muscle; myocardium of ventricle; soleus muscle; extensor digitorum longus muscle; More reference expression data
BioGPS	More reference expression data
Gene ontology
Molecular function	NADH dehydrogenase (ubiquinone) activity; NADH dehydrogenase activity
Cellular component	integral component of membrane; mitochondrial inner membrane; respirasome; endoplasmic reticulum; membrane; mitochondrion; mitochondrial respiratory chain complex I; mitochondrial matrix
Biological process	mitochondrial respiratory chain complex I assembly; mitochondrial electron transport, NADH to ubiquinone
Sources:Amigo / QuickGO
Orthologs
Databases	NCBI: entry; OMA: entry
Species	Human	Mouse
Entrez	4714	67264
Ensembl	ENSG00000166136	ENSMUSG00000025204
UniProt	O95169	Q9D6J5
RefSeq (mRNA)	NM_005004; NM_001284367; NM_001284368	NM_026061; NM_001347447
RefSeq (protein)	NP_001271296; NP_001271297; NP_004995	NP_001334376; NP_080337
Location (UCSC)	Chr 10: 100.52 – 100.53 Mb	Chr 19: 44.54 – 44.54 Mb
PubMed search
- Wikidata
View/Edit Human	View/Edit Mouse

NADH dehydrogenase [ubiquinone] 1 beta subcomplex subunit 8, mitochondrial is an enzyme that in humans is encoded by the NDUFB8 gene. NADH dehydrogenase (ubiquinone) 1 beta subcomplex subunit 8 is an accessory subunit of the NADH dehydrogenase (ubiquinone) complex, located in the mitochondrial inner membrane. It is also known as Complex I and is the largest of the five complexes of the electron transport chain.

== Gene ==
The NDUFB8 gene is located on the q arm of chromosome 10 in position 24.31 and is 6,194 base pairs long.

== Structure ==
The NDUFB8 protein weighs 22 kDa and is composed of 186 amino acids. NDUFB8 is a subunit of the enzyme NADH dehydrogenase (ubiquinone), the largest of the respiratory complexes. The structure is L-shaped with a long, hydrophobic transmembrane domain and a hydrophilic domain for the peripheral arm that includes all the known redox centers and the NADH binding site. NDUFB7 and NDUFB8 have been shown to localize at the intermembrane surface of complex I. It has been noted that the N-terminal hydrophobic domain has the potential to be folded into an alpha helix spanning the inner mitochondrial membrane with a C-terminal hydrophilic domain interacting with globular subunits of Complex I. The highly conserved two-domain structure suggests that this feature is critical for the protein function and that the hydrophobic domain acts as an anchor for the NADH dehydrogenase (ubiquinone) complex at the inner mitochondrial membrane.

== Function ==
The protein encoded by this gene is an accessory subunit of the multisubunit NADH:ubiquinone oxidoreductase (complex I) that is not directly involved in catalysis. Mammalian complex I is composed of 45 different subunits. It locates at the mitochondrial inner membrane. This protein complex has NADH dehydrogenase activity and oxidoreductase activity. It transfers electrons from NADH to the respiratory chain. The immediate electron acceptor for the enzyme is believed to be ubiquinone. Alternative splicing occurs at this locus and two transcript variants encoding distinct isoforms have been identified. Initially, NADH binds to Complex I and transfers two electrons to the isoalloxazine ring of the flavin mononucleotide (FMN) prosthetic arm to form FMNH_{2}. The electrons are transferred through a series of iron-sulfur (Fe-S) clusters in the prosthetic arm and finally to coenzyme Q10 (CoQ), which is reduced to ubiquinol (CoQH_{2}). The flow of electrons changes the redox state of the protein, resulting in a conformational change and pK shift of the ionizable side chain, which pumps four hydrogen ions out of the mitochondrial matrix.
