= NDUFB2 =

Protein-coding gene in the species Homo sapiens

Identifiers
- Aliases: NDUFB2, AGGG, CI-AGGG, NADH:ubiquinone oxidoreductase subunit B2
- External IDs: OMIM: 603838; MGI: 1915448; GeneCards: NDUFB2

Gene location (Human)
Chr.	Chromosome 7 (human)
Band	7q34	Start	140,690,777 bp
Band	7q34	End	140,722,790 bp

Gene location (Mouse)
Chr.	Chromosome 6 (mouse)
Band	6|6 B1	Start	39,569,508 bp
Band	6|6 B1	End	39,580,316 bp
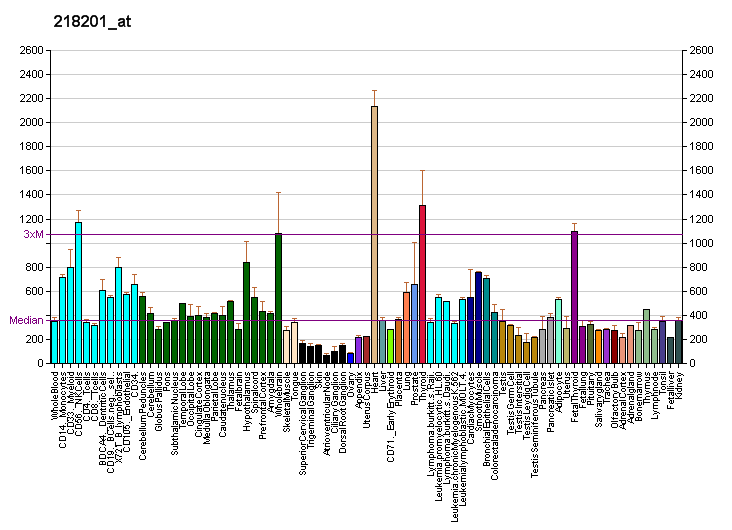

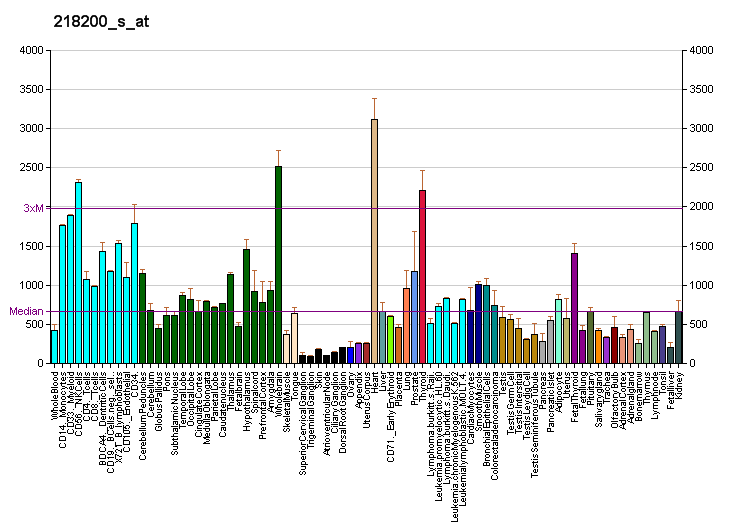
RNA expression pattern
Bgee	Human / Mouse (ortholog); Top expressed in: apex of heart; right ventricle; right lobe of thyroid gland; kidney tubule; right auricle of heart; prefrontal cortex; left lobe of thyroid gland; metanephric glomerulus; endothelial cell; mucosa of transverse colon / Top expressed in: interventricular septum; plantaris muscle; extraocular muscle; choroid plexus of fourth ventricle; facial motor nucleus; extensor digitorum longus muscle; myocardium of ventricle; digastric muscle; soleus muscle; cardiac muscle tissue of left ventricle; More reference expression data
BioGPS	More reference expression data
Gene ontology
Molecular function	NADH dehydrogenase (ubiquinone) activity
Cellular component	mitochondrial inner membrane; mitochondrial respiratory chain complex I; respirasome; membrane; mitochondrion
Biological process	mitochondrial electron transport, NADH to ubiquinone; mitochondrial respiratory chain complex I assembly
Sources:Amigo / QuickGO
Orthologs
Databases	NCBI: entry; OMA: entry
Species	Human	Mouse
Entrez	4708	68198
Ensembl	ENSG00000090266	ENSMUSG00000002416
UniProt	O95178	Q9CPU2
RefSeq (mRNA)	NM_004546	NM_026612; NM_001358797
RefSeq (protein)	NP_004537	NP_080888; NP_001345726
Location (UCSC)	Chr 7: 140.69 – 140.72 Mb	Chr 6: 39.57 – 39.58 Mb
PubMed search
- Wikidata
View/Edit Human	View/Edit Mouse

NADH dehydrogenase [ubiquinone] 1 beta subcomplex subunit 2, mitochondrial is an enzyme that in humans is encoded by the NDUFB2 gene. NADH dehydrogenase (ubiquinone) 1 beta subcomplex, 2, 8kDa is an accessory subunit of the NADH dehydrogenase (ubiquinone) complex, located in the mitochondrial inner membrane. It is also known as Complex I and is the largest of the five complexes of the electron transport chain.

== Structure ==
The NDUFB2 gene, located on the q arm of chromosome 7 in position 34, is 9,966 base pairs long and is composed of 4 exons. The NDUFB2 protein weighs 12 kDa and is composed of 105 amino acids. NDUFB2 is a subunit of the enzyme NADH dehydrogenase (ubiquinone), the largest of the respiratory complexes. The structure is L-shaped with a long, hydrophobic transmembrane domain and a hydrophilic domain for the peripheral arm that includes all the known redox centers and the NADH binding site. NDUFB3 is one of about 31 hydrophobic subunits that form the transmembrane region of Complex I. It has been noted that the N-terminal hydrophobic domain has the potential to be folded into an alpha helix spanning the inner mitochondrial membrane with a C-terminal hydrophilic domain interacting with globular subunits of Complex I. The highly conserved two-domain structure suggests that this feature is critical for the protein function and that the hydrophobic domain acts as an anchor for the NADH dehydrogenase (ubiquinone) complex at the inner mitochondrial membrane. Hydropathy analysis revealed that this subunit and 4 other subunits have an overall hydrophilic pattern, even though they are found within the hydrophobic protein (HP) fraction of complex I.

== Function ==
The human NDUFB2 gene codes for a subunit of Complex I of the respiratory chain, which transfers electrons from NADH to ubiquinone. However, NDUFB2 is an accessory subunit of the complex that is believed not to be involved in catalysis. Initially, NADH binds to Complex I and transfers two electrons to the isoalloxazine ring of the flavin mononucleotide (FMN) prosthetic arm to form FMNH_{2}. The electrons are transferred through a series of iron-sulfur (Fe-S) clusters in the prosthetic arm and finally to coenzyme Q10 (CoQ), which is reduced to ubiquinol (CoQH_{2}). The flow of electrons changes the redox state of the protein, resulting in a conformational change and pK shift of the ionizable side chain, which pumps four hydrogen ions out of the mitochondrial matrix.
