= NDUFB3 =

Protein-coding gene in the species Homo sapiens

Identifiers
- Aliases: NDUFB3, B12, CI-B12, NADH:ubiquinone oxidoreductase subunit B3, MC1DN25
- External IDs: OMIM: 603839; MGI: 1913745; GeneCards: NDUFB3

Gene location (Human)
Chr.	Chromosome 2 (human)
Band	2q33.1	Start	201,071,433 bp
Band	2q33.1	End	201,085,750 bp

Gene location (Mouse)
Chr.	Chromosome 1 (mouse)
Band	1|1 C1.3	Start	58,625,543 bp
Band	1|1 C1.3	End	58,635,123 bp
RNA expression pattern
Bgee	Human / Mouse (ortholog); Top expressed in: right auricle of heart; left ventricle; apex of heart; muscle of thigh; mucosa of transverse colon; biceps brachii; right ventricle; gastrocnemius muscle; thoracic diaphragm; Skeletal muscle tissue of rectus abdominis / Top expressed in: facial motor nucleus; soleus muscle; interventricular septum; plantaris muscle; intercostal muscle; brown adipose tissue; masseter muscle; digastric muscle; ankle joint; extensor digitorum longus muscle; More reference expression data
BioGPS	n/a
Gene ontology
Molecular function	NADH dehydrogenase (ubiquinone) activity
Cellular component	integral component of membrane; mitochondrial inner membrane; mitochondrial respiratory chain complex I; respirasome; membrane; mitochondrion
Biological process	electron transport chain; mitochondrial electron transport, NADH to ubiquinone; mitochondrial respiratory chain complex I assembly
Sources:Amigo / QuickGO
Orthologs
Databases	NCBI: entry; OMA: entry
Species	Human	Mouse
Entrez	4709	66495
Ensembl	ENSG00000119013	ENSMUSG00000026032
UniProt	O43676	Q9CQZ6
RefSeq (mRNA)	NM_001257102; NM_002491	NM_025597
RefSeq (protein)	NP_001244031; NP_002482	NP_079873
Location (UCSC)	Chr 2: 201.07 – 201.09 Mb	Chr 1: 58.63 – 58.64 Mb
PubMed search
- Wikidata
View/Edit Human	View/Edit Mouse

NADH dehydrogenase (ubiquinone) 1 beta subcomplex, 3, 12kDa is a protein that in humans is encoded by the NDUFB3 gene. NADH dehydrogenase (ubiquinone) 1 beta subcomplex, 3, 12kDa is an accessory subunit of the NADH dehydrogenase (ubiquinone) complex, located in the mitochondrial inner membrane. It is also known as Complex I and is the largest of the five complexes of the electron transport chain. Mutations in this gene contribute to mitochondrial complex I deficiency.

== Structure ==
The NDUFB3 gene, located on the q arm of chromosome 2 in position 31.3, is 14,012 base pairs long. The NDUFB3 protein weighs 11.4 kDa and is composed of 98 amino acids. NDUFB3 is a subunit of the enzyme NADH dehydrogenase (ubiquinone), the largest of the respiratory complexes. The structure is L-shaped with a long, hydrophobic transmembrane domain and a hydrophilic domain for the peripheral arm that includes all the known redox centers and the NADH binding site. NDUFB3 is one of about 31 hydrophobic subunits that form the transmembrane region of Complex I. This protein localizes to the inner membrane of the mitochondrion as a single-pass membrane protein. It has been noted that the N-terminal hydrophobic domain has the potential to be folded into an alpha helix spanning the inner mitochondrial membrane with a C-terminal hydrophilic domain interacting with globular subunits of Complex I. The highly conserved two-domain structure suggests that this feature is critical for the protein function and that the hydrophobic domain acts as an anchor for the NADH dehydrogenase (ubiquinone) complex at the inner mitochondrial membrane.

== Function ==
The human NDUFB3 gene codes for a subunit of Complex I of the respiratory chain, which transfers electrons from NADH to ubiquinone. However, NDUFB3 is an accessory subunit of the complex that is believed not to be involved in catalysis. Initially, NADH binds to Complex I and transfers two electrons to the isoalloxazine ring of the flavin mononucleotide (FMN) prosthetic arm to form FMNH_{2}. The electrons are transferred through a series of iron-sulfur (Fe-S) clusters in the prosthetic arm and finally to coenzyme Q10 (CoQ), which is reduced to ubiquinol (CoQH_{2}). The flow of electrons changes the redox state of the protein, resulting in a conformational change and pK shift of the ionizable side chain, which pumps four hydrogen ions out of the mitochondrial matrix.

== Clinical significance ==
Mutations in the NDUFB3 gene have been implicated in the pathogenicity of human oxidative phosphorylation disease, characterized by a biochemical defect in the respiratory chain.
