= NDUFA3 =

Protein-coding gene in the species Homo sapiens

Identifiers
- Aliases: NDUFA3, B9, CI-B9, NADH:ubiquinone oxidoreductase subunit A3
- External IDs: OMIM: 603832; MGI: 1913341; GeneCards: NDUFA3

Gene location (Human)
| Chr. | Chromosome 19 (human) |
| Band | 19q13.42 | Start | 54,102,728 bp |
| Band | 19q13.42 | End | 54,109,257 bp |
RNA expression pattern
| Bgee | Human / Mouse (ortholog); Top expressed in: primary visual cortex; muscle of thigh; superior frontal gyrus; apex of heart; putamen; prefrontal cortex; nucleus accumbens; caudate nucleus; substantia nigra; temporal lobe / n/a; More reference expression data |
| BioGPS | n/a |
Gene ontology
| Molecular function | NADH dehydrogenase (ubiquinone) activity |
| Cellular component | integral component of membrane; mitochondrial inner membrane; mitochondrial respiratory chain complex I; respirasome; membrane; mitochondrion |
| Biological process | mitochondrial electron transport, NADH to ubiquinone; mitochondrial respiratory chain complex I assembly |
Sources:Amigo / QuickGO
Orthologs
| Databases | NCBI: entry; OMA: entry |
| Species | Human | Mouse |
| Entrez | 4696 | 66091 |
| Ensembl | ENSG00000276061; ENSG00000273642; ENSG00000276220; ENSG00000278365; ENSG00000277722 ENSG00000276766; ENSG00000275605; ENSG00000274359; ENSG00000170906; ENSG00000275724 | n/a |
| UniProt | O95167 | Q9CQ91 |
| RefSeq (mRNA) | NM_004542 | NM_025348 |
| RefSeq (protein) | NP_004533 | NP_079624 |
| Location (UCSC) | Chr 19: 54.1 – 54.11 Mb | n/a |
| PubMed search |
- Wikidata
| View/Edit Human | View/Edit Mouse |

NADH dehydrogenase [ubiquinone] 1 alpha subcomplex subunit 3 is a protein that in humans is encoded by the NDUFA3 gene. The NDUFA3 protein is a subunit of NADH dehydrogenase (ubiquinone), which is located in the mitochondrial inner membrane and is the largest of the five complexes of the electron transport chain.

== Structure ==
The NDUFA3 gene is located on the q arm of chromosome 19 at position 13.42, and it has a total span of 4,123 base pairs. The NDUFA3 gene produces a 9.3 kDa protein composed of 84 amino acids. NDUFA3 is a subunit of the enzyme NADH dehydrogenase (ubiquinone), the largest of the respiratory complexes. The structure is L-shaped with a long, hydrophobic transmembrane domain and a hydrophilic domain for the peripheral arm that includes all the known redox centers and the NADH binding site. NDUFA3 is one of about 31 hydrophobic subunits that form the transmembrane region of Complex I. It has been noted that the N-terminal hydrophobic domain has the potential to be folded into an alpha helix spanning the inner mitochondrial membrane with a C-terminal hydrophilic domain interacting with globular subunits of Complex I. The highly conserved two-domain structure suggests that this feature is critical for the protein function and that the hydrophobic domain acts as an anchor for the NADH:ubiquinone oxidoreductase complex at the inner mitochondrial membrane.

== Function ==
The human NDUFA3 gene codes for a subunit of Complex I of the respiratory chain, which transfers electrons from NADH to ubiquinone. However, NDUFA3 is an accessory subunit of the complex that is believed not to be involved in catalysis. Initially, NADH binds to Complex I and transfers two electrons to the isoalloxazine ring of the flavin mononucleotide (FMN) prosthetic arm to form FMNH_{2}. The electrons are transferred through a series of iron-sulfur (Fe-S) clusters in the prosthetic arm and finally to coenzyme Q10 (CoQ), which is reduced to ubiquinol (CoQH_{2}). The flow of electrons changes the redox state of the protein, resulting in a conformational change and pK shift of the ionizable side chain, which pumps four hydrogen ions out of the mitochondrial matrix.

== Interactions ==
NDUFA3 has been shown to interact with ubiquitin C, a polyubiquitin precursor.
