= NDUFB7 =

Protein-coding gene in the species Homo sapiens

Identifiers
- Aliases: NDUFB7, B18, CI-B18, NADH:ubiquinone oxidoreductase subunit B7
- External IDs: OMIM: 603842; MGI: 1914166; GeneCards: NDUFB7

Gene location (Human)
Chr.	Chromosome 19 (human)
Band	19p13.12	Start	14,566,078 bp
Band	19p13.12	End	14,572,066 bp

Gene location (Mouse)
Chr.	Chromosome 8 (mouse)
Band	8|8 C2	Start	84,293,300 bp
Band	8|8 C2	End	84,298,255 bp
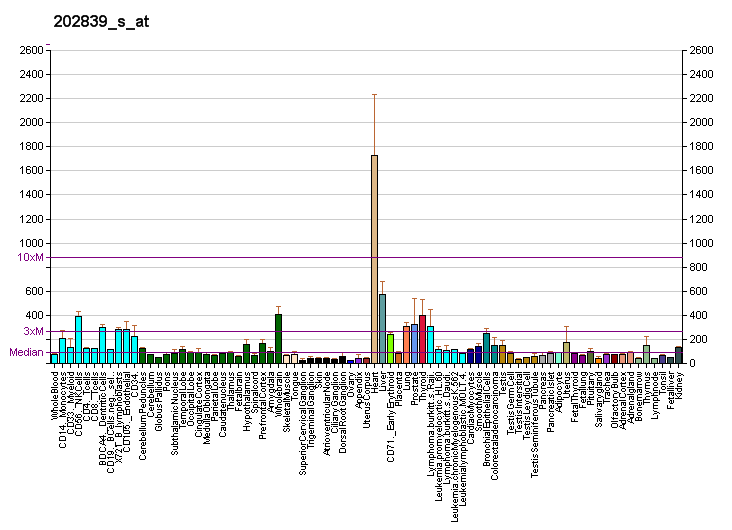
RNA expression pattern
Bgee	Human / Mouse (ortholog); Top expressed in: apex of heart; mucosa of transverse colon; right auricle of heart; muscle of thigh; muscle layer of sigmoid colon; olfactory zone of nasal mucosa; gastrocnemius muscle; body of stomach; anterior pituitary; left coronary artery / Top expressed in: aortic valve; ascending aorta; fossa; facial motor nucleus; condyle; motor neuron; choroid plexus of fourth ventricle; internal carotid artery; Paneth cell; myocardium of ventricle; More reference expression data
BioGPS	More reference expression data
Gene ontology
Molecular function	NADH dehydrogenase (ubiquinone) activity; NADH dehydrogenase activity
Cellular component	mitochondrial inner membrane; mitochondrial respiratory chain complex I; mitochondrial intermembrane space; respirasome; membrane; mitochondrion
Biological process	mitochondrial electron transport, NADH to ubiquinone; mitochondrial respiratory chain complex I assembly
Sources:Amigo / QuickGO
Orthologs
Databases	NCBI: entry; OMA: entry
Species	Human	Mouse
Entrez	4713	66916
Ensembl	ENSG00000099795	ENSMUSG00000033938
UniProt	P17568	Q9CR61
RefSeq (mRNA)	NM_004146	NM_025843
RefSeq (protein)	NP_004137	NP_080119
Location (UCSC)	Chr 19: 14.57 – 14.57 Mb	Chr 8: 84.29 – 84.3 Mb
PubMed search
- Wikidata
View/Edit Human	View/Edit Mouse

NADH dehydrogenase [ubiquinone] 1 beta subcomplex subunit 7, also known as complex I-B18, is an enzyme that in humans is encoded by the NDUFB7 gene. NADH dehydrogenase (ubiquinone) 1 beta subcomplex subunit 7 is an accessory subunit of the NADH dehydrogenase (ubiquinone) complex, located in the mitochondrial inner membrane. It is also known as Complex I and is the largest of the five complexes of the electron transport chain.

== Gene ==
The NDUFB7 gene is located on the p arm of chromosome 19 in position 13.12 and is 6,000 base pairs long.

== Structure ==
The NDUFB7 protein weighs 16.4 kDa and is composed of 137 amino acids. NDUFB7 is a subunit of the enzyme NADH dehydrogenase (ubiquinone), the largest of the respiratory complexes. The structure is L-shaped with a long, hydrophobic transmembrane domain and a hydrophilic domain for the peripheral arm that includes all the known redox centers and the NADH binding site. NDUFB7 and NDUFB8 have been shown to localize at the intermembrane surface of complex I. It has been noted that the N-terminal hydrophobic domain has the potential to be folded into an alpha helix spanning the inner mitochondrial membrane with a C-terminal hydrophilic domain interacting with globular subunits of Complex I. The highly conserved two-domain structure suggests that this feature is critical for the protein function and that the hydrophobic domain acts as an anchor for the NADH dehydrogenase (ubiquinone) complex at the inner mitochondrial membrane.

== Function ==
The protein encoded by this gene is an accessory subunit of the multisubunit NADH:ubiquinone oxidoreductase (complex I) that is not directly involved in catalysis. Mammalian complex I is composed of 45 different subunits. It locates at the mitochondrial inner membrane. This protein complex has NADH dehydrogenase activity and oxidoreductase activity. It transfers electrons from NADH to the respiratory chain. The immediate electron acceptor for the enzyme is believed to be ubiquinone. Alternative splicing occurs at this locus and two transcript variants encoding distinct isoforms have been identified. Initially, NADH binds to Complex I and transfers two electrons to the isoalloxazine ring of the flavin mononucleotide (FMN) prosthetic arm to form FMNH_{2}. The electrons are transferred through a series of iron-sulfur (Fe-S) clusters in the prosthetic arm and finally to coenzyme Q10 (CoQ), which is reduced to ubiquinol (CoQH_{2}). The flow of electrons changes the redox state of the protein, resulting in a conformational change and pK shift of the ionizable side chain, which pumps four hydrogen ions out of the mitochondrial matrix.
