= NDUFB5 =

Protein-coding gene in the species Homo sapiens

Identifiers
- Aliases: NDUFB5, CISGDH, SGDH, NADH:ubiquinone oxidoreductase subunit B5
- External IDs: OMIM: 603841; MGI: 1913296; GeneCards: NDUFB5

Gene location (Human)
Chr.	Chromosome 3 (human)
Band	3q26.33	Start	179,604,690 bp
Band	3q26.33	End	179,627,647 bp

Gene location (Mouse)
Chr.	Chromosome 3 (mouse)
Band	3|3 A3	Start	32,791,139 bp
Band	3|3 A3	End	32,805,715 bp
RNA expression pattern
Bgee	Human / Mouse (ortholog); Top expressed in: right ventricle; biceps brachii; Skeletal muscle tissue of biceps brachii; retinal pigment epithelium; left ventricle; right auricle of heart; triceps brachii muscle; vastus lateralis muscle; right adrenal cortex; muscle of thigh / Top expressed in: plantaris muscle; intercostal muscle; extensor digitorum longus muscle; cardiac muscle tissue of left ventricle; interventricular septum; facial motor nucleus; Ileal epithelium; atrioventricular valve; endocardial cushion; soleus muscle; More reference expression data
BioGPS	n/a
Gene ontology
Molecular function	NADH dehydrogenase (ubiquinone) activity
Cellular component	integral component of membrane; mitochondrial inner membrane; mitochondrial respiratory chain complex I; respirasome; membrane; mitochondrion; nucleoplasm
Biological process	mitochondrial electron transport, NADH to ubiquinone; mitochondrial respiratory chain complex I assembly
Sources:Amigo / QuickGO
Orthologs
Databases	NCBI: entry; OMA: entry
Species	Human	Mouse
Entrez	4711	66046
Ensembl	ENSG00000136521	ENSMUSG00000027673
UniProt	O43674	Q9CQH3
RefSeq (mRNA)	NM_002492; NM_001199957; NM_001199958	NM_025316
RefSeq (protein)	NP_001186886; NP_001186887; NP_002483; NP_001186887.1	NP_079592
Location (UCSC)	Chr 3: 179.6 – 179.63 Mb	Chr 3: 32.79 – 32.81 Mb
PubMed search
- Wikidata
View/Edit Human	View/Edit Mouse

NADH dehydrogenase (ubiquinone) 1 beta subcomplex, 5, 16kDa is a protein that in humans is encoded by the NDUFB5 gene. The NDUFB5 protein is a subunit of NADH dehydrogenase (ubiquinone), which is located in the mitochondrial inner membrane and is the largest of the five complexes of the electron transport chain.

== Structure ==
The NDUFB5 gene, located on the q arm of chromosome 3 in position 26.33, is 19,713 base pairs long. The NDUFB5 protein weighs 21.7 kDa and is composed of 189 amino acids. NDUFB5 is a subunit of the enzyme NADH dehydrogenase (ubiquinone), the largest of the respiratory complexes. The structure is L-shaped with a long, hydrophobic transmembrane domain and a hydrophilic domain for the peripheral arm that includes all the known redox centers and the NADH binding site. NDUFB5 is one of about 31 hydrophobic subunits that form the transmembrane region of Complex I and is of the non-catalytic subunits of the complex. It has been noted that the N-terminal hydrophobic domain has the potential to be folded into an alpha helix spanning the inner mitochondrial membrane with a C-terminal hydrophilic domain interacting with globular subunits of Complex I. The highly conserved two-domain structure suggests that this feature is critical for the protein function and that the hydrophobic domain acts as an anchor for the NADH dehydrogenase (ubiquinone) complex at the inner mitochondrial membrane.

== Function ==
The human NDUFB5 gene codes for a subunit of Complex I of the respiratory chain, which transfers electrons from NADH to ubiquinone. However, NDUFB5 is an accessory subunit of the complex that is believed not to be involved in catalysis. Initially, NADH binds to Complex I and transfers two electrons to the isoalloxazine ring of the flavin mononucleotide (FMN) prosthetic arm to form FMNH_{2}. The electrons are transferred through a series of iron-sulfur (Fe-S) clusters in the prosthetic arm and finally to coenzyme Q10 (CoQ), which is reduced to ubiquinol (CoQH_{2}). The flow of electrons changes the redox state of the protein, resulting in a conformational change and pK shift of the ionizable side chain, which pumps four hydrogen ions out of the mitochondrial matrix.
