= NDUFA8 =

Protein-coding gene in the species Homo sapiens

Identifiers
- Aliases: NDUFA8, CI-19KD, CI-PGIV, PGIV, NADH:ubiquinone oxidoreductase subunit A8, MC1DN37
- External IDs: OMIM: 603359; MGI: 1915625; GeneCards: NDUFA8

Gene location (Human)
Chr.	Chromosome 9 (human)
Band	9q33.2	Start	122,144,058 bp
Band	9q33.2	End	122,159,779 bp

Gene location (Mouse)
Chr.	Chromosome 2 (mouse)
Band	2|2 B	Start	35,926,338 bp
Band	2|2 B	End	35,939,418 bp
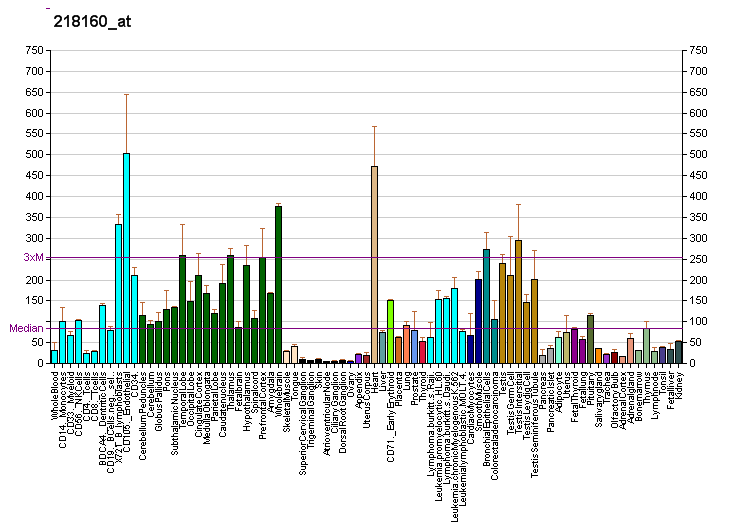
RNA expression pattern
Bgee	Human / Mouse (ortholog); Top expressed in: apex of heart; left ventricle; right auricle of heart; right ventricle; muscle of thigh; caudate nucleus; anterior cingulate cortex; myocardium; myocardium of left ventricle; Skeletal muscle tissue of biceps brachii / Top expressed in: digastric muscle; temporal muscle; right ventricle; sternocleidomastoid muscle; triceps brachii muscle; myocardium of ventricle; atrioventricular valve; interventricular septum; right kidney; thoracic diaphragm; More reference expression data
BioGPS	More reference expression data
Gene ontology
Molecular function	NADH dehydrogenase (ubiquinone) activity; protein-containing complex binding
Cellular component	membrane; respirasome; mitochondrial intermembrane space; mitochondrion; mitochondrial inner membrane; mitochondrial respiratory chain complex I
Biological process	mitochondrial electron transport, NADH to ubiquinone; mitochondrial respiratory chain complex I assembly
Sources:Amigo / QuickGO
Orthologs
Databases	NCBI: entry; OMA: entry
Species	Human	Mouse
Entrez	4702	68375
Ensembl	ENSG00000119421	ENSMUSG00000026895
UniProt	P51970	Q9DCJ5
RefSeq (mRNA)	NM_014222; NM_001318195	NM_026703
RefSeq (protein)	NP_001305124; NP_055037	NP_080979
Location (UCSC)	Chr 9: 122.14 – 122.16 Mb	Chr 2: 35.93 – 35.94 Mb
PubMed search
- Wikidata
View/Edit Human	View/Edit Mouse

NADH dehydrogenase [ubiquinone] 1 alpha subcomplex subunit 8 is an enzyme that in humans is encoded by the NDUFA8 gene. The NDUFA8 protein is a subunit of NADH dehydrogenase (ubiquinone), which is located in the mitochondrial inner membrane and is the largest of the five complexes of the electron transport chain.

== Structure ==
The NDUFA8 gene is located on the q arm of chromosome 9 in position 33.2 and spans 27,354 base pairs. The gene produces a 20 kDa protein composed of 172 amino acids. NDUFA8 is a subunit of the enzyme NADH dehydrogenase (ubiquinone), the largest of the respiratory complexes. The structure is L-shaped with a long, hydrophobic transmembrane domain and a hydrophilic domain for the peripheral arm that includes all the known redox centers and the NADH binding site. It has been noted that the N-terminal hydrophobic domain has the potential to be folded into an alpha helix spanning the inner mitochondrial membrane with a C-terminal hydrophilic domain interacting with globular subunits of Complex I. The highly conserved two-domain structure suggests that this feature is critical for the protein function and that the hydrophobic domain acts as an anchor for the NADH dehydrogenase (ubiquinone) complex at the inner mitochondrial membrane. NDUFA8 is one of about 31 hydrophobic subunits that form the transmembrane region of Complex I. The predicted secondary structure is primarily alpha helix, but the carboxy-terminal half of the protein has high potential to adopt a coiled-coil form. The amino-terminal part contains a putative beta sheet rich in hydrophobic amino acids that may serve as mitochondrial import signal. Related pseudogenes have also been identified on four other chromosomes.

== Function ==
The human NDUFA8 gene codes for a subunit of Complex I of the respiratory chain, which transfers electrons from NADH to ubiquinone. NADH binds to Complex I and transfers two electrons to the isoalloxazine ring of the flavin mononucleotide (FMN) prosthetic arm to form FMNH_{2}. The electrons are transferred through a series of iron-sulfur (Fe-S) clusters in the prosthetic arm and finally to coenzyme Q10 (CoQ), which is reduced to ubiquinol (CoQH_{2}). The flow of electrons changes the redox state of the protein, resulting in a conformational change and pK shift of the ionizable side chain, which pumps four hydrogen ions out of the mitochondrial matrix.
