= NDUFA7 =

Protein-coding gene in the species Homo sapiens

Identifiers
- Aliases: NDUFA7, B14.5a, CI-B14.5a, NADH:ubiquinone oxidoreductase subunit A7
- External IDs: OMIM: 602139; MGI: 1913666; GeneCards: NDUFA7

Gene location (Human)
Chr.	Chromosome 19 (human)
Band	19p13.2	Start	8,308,768 bp
Band	19p13.2	End	8,321,375 bp

Gene location (Mouse)
Chr.	Chromosome 17 (mouse)
Band	17|17 B1	Start	34,043,546 bp
Band	17|17 B1	End	34,057,291 bp
RNA expression pattern
Bgee	Human / Mouse (ortholog); Top expressed in: muscle of thigh; apex of heart; gastrocnemius muscle; anterior pituitary; left adrenal cortex; right adrenal gland; right auricle of heart; right adrenal cortex; anterior cingulate cortex; mucosa of transverse colon / Top expressed in: choroid plexus of fourth ventricle; right ventricle; right kidney; interventricular septum; cardiac muscle tissue of left ventricle; digastric muscle; temporal muscle; plantaris muscle; extraocular muscle; medial ganglionic eminence; More reference expression data
BioGPS	n/a
Gene ontology
Molecular function	structural constituent of ribosome; NADH dehydrogenase (ubiquinone) activity
Cellular component	mitochondrial inner membrane; mitochondrial respiratory chain complex I; respirasome; mitochondrial ribosome; membrane; mitochondrion
Biological process	mitochondrial respiratory chain complex I assembly; ATP synthesis coupled electron transport; mitochondrial translation; mitochondrial electron transport, NADH to ubiquinone
Sources:Amigo / QuickGO
Orthologs
Databases	NCBI: entry; OMA: entry
Species	Human	Mouse
Entrez	4701	66416
Ensembl	ENSG00000267855	ENSMUSG00000041881
UniProt	O95182	Q9Z1P6
RefSeq (mRNA)	NM_005001	NM_023202
RefSeq (protein)	NP_004992	NP_075691
Location (UCSC)	Chr 19: 8.31 – 8.32 Mb	Chr 17: 34.04 – 34.06 Mb
PubMed search
- Wikidata
View/Edit Human	View/Edit Mouse

NADH dehydrogenase [ubiquinone] 1 alpha subcomplex subunit 7 is an enzyme that in humans is encoded by the NDUFA7 gene. The NDUFA7 protein is a subunit of NADH dehydrogenase (ubiquinone), which is located in the mitochondrial inner membrane and is the largest of the five complexes of the electron transport chain.

== Structure ==
The NDUFA7 gene is located on the p arm of chromosome 19 in position 13.2 and spans 12,618 base pairs. The gene produces a 12.5 kDa protein composed of 113 amino acids. NDUFA7 is a subunit of the enzyme NADH dehydrogenase (ubiquinone), the largest of the respiratory complexes. The structure is L-shaped with a long, hydrophobic transmembrane domain and a hydrophilic domain for the peripheral arm that includes all the known redox centers and the NADH binding site. It has been noted that the N-terminal hydrophobic domain has the potential to be folded into an alpha helix spanning the inner mitochondrial membrane with a C-terminal hydrophilic domain interacting with globular subunits of Complex I. The highly conserved two-domain structure suggests that this feature is critical for the protein function and that the hydrophobic domain acts as an anchor for the NADH dehydrogenase (ubiquinone) complex at the inner mitochondrial membrane. NDUFA7 is one of about 31 hydrophobic subunits that form the transmembrane region of Complex I. The predicted secondary structure is primarily alpha helix, but the carboxy-terminal half of the protein has high potential to adopt a coiled-coil form. The amino-terminal part contains a putative beta sheet rich in hydrophobic amino acids that may serve as mitochondrial import signal. Related pseudogenes have also been identified on four other chromosomes.

== Function ==
The human NDUFA7 gene codes for a subunit of Complex I of the respiratory chain, which transfers electrons from NADH to ubiquinone. Initially, NADH binds to Complex I and transfers two electrons to the isoalloxazine ring of the flavin mononucleotide (FMN) prosthetic arm to form FMNH_{2}. The electrons are transferred through a series of iron-sulfur (Fe-S) clusters in the prosthetic arm and finally to coenzyme Q10 (CoQ), which is reduced to ubiquinol (CoQH_{2}). The flow of electrons changes the redox state of the protein, resulting in a conformational change and pK shift of the ionizable side chain, which pumps four hydrogen ions out of the mitochondrial matrix.
