= NDUFC1 =

Protein-coding gene in the species Homo sapiens

Identifiers
- Aliases: NDUFC1, KFYI, NADH:ubiquinone oxidoreductase subunit C1
- External IDs: OMIM: 603844; MGI: 1913627; GeneCards: NDUFC1

Gene location (Human)
Chr.	Chromosome 4 (human)
Band	4q31.1	Start	139,266,880 bp
Band	4q31.1	End	139,302,551 bp

Gene location (Mouse)
Chr.	Chromosome 3 (mouse)
Band	3|3 C	Start	51,312,098 bp
Band	3|3 C	End	51,316,409 bp
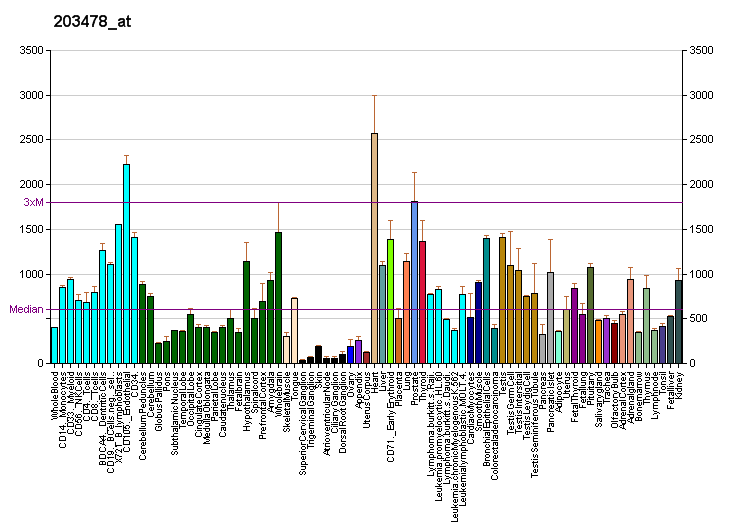
RNA expression pattern
Bgee	Human / Mouse (ortholog); Top expressed in: renal medulla; right ventricle; thoracic diaphragm; Skeletal muscle tissue of rectus abdominis; biceps brachii; beta cell; body of tongue; Skeletal muscle tissue of biceps brachii; kidney tubule; vastus lateralis muscle / Top expressed in: muscle of thigh; right kidney; digastric muscle; extraocular muscle; sternocleidomastoid muscle; myocardium of ventricle; temporal muscle; triceps brachii muscle; right ventricle; atrioventricular valve; More reference expression data
BioGPS	More reference expression data
Gene ontology
Molecular function	NADH dehydrogenase (ubiquinone) activity
Cellular component	integral component of membrane; mitochondrial inner membrane; respirasome; membrane; mitochondrion; mitochondrial respiratory chain complex I
Biological process	mitochondrial electron transport, NADH to ubiquinone; mitochondrial respiratory chain complex I assembly
Sources:Amigo / QuickGO
Orthologs
Databases	NCBI: entry; OMA: entry
Species	Human	Mouse
Entrez	4717	66377
Ensembl	ENSG00000109390	ENSMUSG00000037152
UniProt	O43677	Q9CQY9
RefSeq (mRNA)	NM_002494; NM_001184986; NM_001184987; NM_001184988; NM_001184989 NM_001184990; NM_001184991	NM_025523
RefSeq (protein)	NP_001171915; NP_001171916; NP_001171917; NP_001171918; NP_001171919 NP_001171920; NP_002485	NP_079799
Location (UCSC)	Chr 4: 139.27 – 139.3 Mb	Chr 3: 51.31 – 51.32 Mb
PubMed search
- Wikidata
View/Edit Human	View/Edit Mouse

NADH dehydrogenase [ubiquinone] 1 subunit C1, mitochondrial is an enzyme that in humans is encoded by the NDUFC1 gene.
