= COXFA4 =

Protein-coding gene in humans

Identifiers
- Aliases: COXFA4, CI-9k, CI-MLRQ, MLRQ, NDUFA4, mitochondrial complex associated, NDUFA4 mitochondrial complex associated, MC4DN21, MRCAF1, MISTR1, NDUFA4
- External IDs: OMIM: 603833; MGI: 107686; GeneCards: COXFA4
Available structures
PDB	Ortholog search: PDBe RCSB
PDB	List of PDB id codes 1LEG, 1LEK, 1MWA, 2CKB

Gene location (Human)
Chr.	Chromosome 7 (human)
Band	7p21.3	Start	10,931,943 bp
Band	7p21.3	End	10,940,153 bp
RNA expression pattern
Bgee	Human / Mouse (ortholog); Top expressed in: right ventricle; myocardium; cerebellar vermis; myocardium of left ventricle; pons; cardiac muscle tissue of right atrium; prefrontal cortex; biceps brachii; Skeletal muscle tissue of biceps brachii; lateral nuclear group of thalamus / n/a; More reference expression data
BioGPS	n/a
Gene ontology
Molecular function	NADH dehydrogenase (ubiquinone) activity; cytochrome-c oxidase activity; protein binding; protein-containing complex binding
Cellular component	mitochondrial inner membrane; mitochondrial respiratory chain complex I; respirasome; membrane; mitochondrion; mitochondrial respiratory chain complex IV
Biological process	mitochondrial electron transport, NADH to ubiquinone; proton transmembrane transport; mitochondrial electron transport, cytochrome c to oxygen
Sources:Amigo / QuickGO
Orthologs
Databases	NCBI: entry; OMA: entry
Species	Human	Mouse
Entrez	4697	17992
Ensembl	ENSG00000189043	ENSMUSG00000029632
UniProt	O00483	Q62425
RefSeq (mRNA)	NM_002489	NM_010886
RefSeq (protein)	NP_002480	NP_035016
Location (UCSC)	Chr 7: 10.93 – 10.94 Mb	n/a
PubMed search
- Wikidata
View/Edit Human	View/Edit Mouse

Cytochrome c oxidase subunit FA4 is a protein that in humans is encoded by the COXFA4 gene (previously NDUFA4). The COXFA4/NDUFA4 protein protein was at first erroneously though to be a subunit of NADH dehydrogenase (ubiquinone), which is located in the mitochondrial inner membrane and is the largest of the five complexes of the electron transport chain. However, recent research has described COXFA4 as a subunit of cytochrome c oxidase. Mutations in the COXFA4 gene are associated with Leigh's syndrome.

== Structure ==
The COXFA4 gene is located on the p arm of chromosome 7 at position 21.3 with a total length of 8,234 base pairs. The COXFA4 gene produces a 9.4 kDa protein composed of 81 amino acids.

COXFA4 (then called NDUFA4) was previously believed to be a subunit of the enzyme NADH dehydrogenase (ubiquinone) (Complex I), the largest of the respiratory complexes.

More recent research has demonstrated that no perturbation of Complex I occurs upon COXFA4 deletion, calling into question its role in this complex. It has been demonstrated that COXFA4 plays a role in Complex IV function and biogenesis, however, with some authors suggesting that the COXFA4 gene be renamed and the structure of both Complex I and Complex IV be re-evaluated.

== Clinical significance ==
Mutations in the COXFA4 gene can result in Leigh's syndrome, a severe neurological disorder that typically arises in the first year of life. Disruption of Complex IV, also called cytochrome c oxidase or COX, is the most common cause of Leigh syndrome. Given that COXFA4 has only recently been identified as a subunit of Complex IV rather than Complex I, patients with previously unexplained COX deficiencies could be genetically tested for NDUFA4 mutations.

== Interactions ==
COXFA4 has many protein-protein interactions, including ubiquitin proteins such as ubiquitin C and UBL4A, as well as CUL3 and PARK7.
