= Mitochondrial myopathy =

Muscle disorders caused by mitochondrial dysfunction

- Other names: Mitochondrial muscle disease; muscle mitochondrinopathy; muscle mitochondrial dysfunction
- Simplified structure of a typical mitochondrion
- Specialty: Neuromuscular medicine

Mitochondrial myopathies are types of myopathies associated with mitochondrial disease. Adenosine triphosphate (ATP), the chemical used to provide energy for the cell, cannot be produced sufficiently by oxidative phosphorylation when the mitochondrion is either damaged or missing necessary enzymes or transport proteins. With ATP production deficient in mitochondria, there is an over-reliance on anaerobic glycolysis which leads to lactic acidosis either at rest or exercise-induced.

Primary mitochondrial myopathies are inherited, while secondary mitochondrial myopathies may be inherited (e.g. Duchenne's muscular dystrophy) or environmental (e.g. alcoholic myopathy). When it is an inherited primary disease, it is one of the metabolic myopathies.

On biopsy, the muscle tissue of patients with these diseases usually demonstrate "ragged red" muscle fibers on Gomori trichrome staining. The ragged-red appearance is due to a buildup of abnormal mitochondria underneath the plasma membrane. These ragged-red fibres may contain normal or abnormally increased accumulations of glycogen and neutral lipids, with histochemical staining showing abnormal respiratory chain involvement, such as decreased succinate dehydrogenase or cytochrome c oxidase. Inheritance was believed to be maternal (non-Mendelian extranuclear). It is now known that certain nuclear DNA deletions can also cause mitochondrial myopathy such as the OPA1 gene deletion.

== Signs and symptoms ==
Proximal muscle weakness, exercise intolerance, lactic acidosis, high serum lactate/pyruvate ratio, normal to elevated serum CK, dyspnea, exaggerated cardiorespiratory response to exercise are common symptoms. It may be isolated to the muscle (pure myopathy) or may be systemic including not only myopathy, but also eye abnormalities, peripheral neuropathy, and neurological abnormalities. Muscle biopsy typically shows ragged-red fibres, histochemical staining shows abnormality of respiratory chain or decreased cytochrome c oxidase (COX).

The five most common are MELAS, MERF, KSS, CPEO, and MNGIE which are listed below:

- Mitochondrial encephalomyopathy, lactic acidosis, and stroke-like syndrome (MELAS)
  - Varying degrees of cognitive impairment and dementia
  - Lactic acidosis
  - Strokes
  - Transient ischemic attacks
  - Hearing loss
  - Weight loss
- Myoclonic epilepsy and ragged-red fibers (MERRF)
  - Progressive myoclonic epilepsy
  - Clumps of diseased mitochondria accumulate in muscle fibers and appear as "ragged-red fibers" when muscle is stained with modified Gömöri trichrome stain
  - Short stature
- Kearns–Sayre syndrome (KSS)
  - External ophthalmoplegia
  - Cardiac conduction defects
  - Sensorineural hearing loss
- Chronic progressive external ophthalmoplegia (CPEO)
  - Progressive ophthalmoparesis
  - Symptomatic overlap with other mitochondrial myopathies
- Mitochondrial neurogastrointestinal encephalopathy (MNGIE)
  - Muscle weakness and atrophy, more prominent distally
  - Hyporeflexic or areflexic
  - Ptosis and ophthalmoparesis common
  - Gastrointestinal dysmotility (such as bloating, stomach cramps, diarrhea)

== Cause ==
Many mitochondrial myopathies have mitochondrial inheritance

Mitochondrial myopathy literally means mitochondrial muscle disease, muscle disease caused by mitochondrial dysfunction. The mitochondrion is the primary producer of energy in nearly all cells throughout the body. The exception is mature erythrocytes (red blood cells), so that they do not use up the oxygen that they carry. In the eye, the lens and outer segment of the retina contain almost no mitochondria. Muscle cells have many mitochondria, particularly type I muscle fibres, and if the mitochondria have problems by which they do not produce enough energy for the cell to function, problems occur.

The cause may be genetic, with many having mitochondrial inheritance (involving the mitochondrial DNA which is only passed on from the mother), although nuclear DNA mutations with Mendelian inheritance that are either autosomal dominant, recessive, or X-linked recessive also exist. A nuclear DNA example is a mutation within the POLG (polymerase gamma) gene, which causes mitochondrial DNA (mtDNA) to become damaged and lose function.

=== Disease list ===
Name (alternate names)	Gene(s)	Inheritance pattern (MT, AR, AD, X-Linked)	OMIM # (GD: gene description, PS: phenotypic series)
Mitochondrial encephalomyopathy, lactic acidosis, and stroke-like syndrome (MELAS) (Juvenile myopathy, encephalopathy, lactic acidosis and stroke)	MT-TL1, MT-TQ, MT-TH, MT-TK, MT-TC, MT-TS1, MT-ND1, MT-ND5, MT-ND6, MT-TS2	MT	540000
Myoclonic epilepsy and ragged-red fibers (MERRF)	MT-TK, MT-TL1, MT-TH, MT-TS1, MT-TS2, MT-TF	MT	545000
Kearns–Sayre syndrome (KSS) (Ophthalmoplegia, pigmentary degeneration of retina, and cardiomyopathy; oculocraniosomatic syndrome; ophthalmoplegia-plus syndrome; mitochondrial cytopathy, ophthalmoplegia, progressive external, with ragged-red fibers; chronic progressive external ophthalmoplegia with myopathy; CPEO with myopathy; CPEO with ragged-red fibers)	MT-TL1	MT	530000
Chronic progressive external ophthalmoplegia (CPEO) (Progressive external ophthalmoplegia with mitochondrial DNA deletions, autosomal recessive/dominant)	POLG, SLC25A4, RNASEH1, TWNK, TK2, POLG2, DGUOK, TOP3A, RRM2B	AR/AD	PS157640
Mitochondrial DNA depletion syndrome (MNGIE type) (Mitochondrial neurogastrointestinal encephalopathy (MNGIE); myoneurogastrointestinal encephalopathy syndrome; polyneuropathy, ophthalmoplegia, leukoencephalopathy, and intestinal pseudoobstruction; POLIP syndrome)	TYMP, RRM2B, POLG, LIG3	AR	603041; 612075; 613662; 619780
Mitochondrial DNA depletion syndrome (Alpers type, cardiomyopathic type, encephalomyopathic type, hepatocerebral type, and myopathic type)	MGME1, SLC25A10, TK2, POLG, SLC25A21, SUCLA2, TWNK, TFAM, AGK, MRM2, SLC25A4, OPA1, SUCLG1	AR/AD	PS603041
Mitochondrial myopathy, infantile, transient (MMIT) (Mitochondrial myopathy, infantile, transient, due to respiratory chain deficiency; COX deficiency myopathy, infantile, transient; respiratory chain deficiency, infantile, transient)	MT-TE	MT	500009
Mitochondrial myopathy, lethal, infantile (LIMM) (Lethal infantile mitochondrial myopathy)	MT-TT	MT	551000
Hereditary myopathy with lactic acidosis (HML) (Myopathy with exercise intolerance, Swedish type; myopathy with deficiency of succinate dehydrogenase and aconitase; myoglobinuria due to abnormal glycolysis; Larsson–Linderholm syndrome; Linderholm myopathy)	ISCU	AR/AD	255125
Mitochondrial myopathy with diabetes (Mitochondrial myopathy, lipid type)	MT-TE	MT	500002
Maternally inherited diabetes and deafness (MIDD) (Diabetes and deafness (DAD); Ballinger–Wallace syndrome; Noninsulin-dependent diabetes mellitus with deafness, maternally inherited)	MT-TL1, MT-TE, MT-TK	MT	520000
Myopathy, mitochondrial progressive, with congenital cataract and developmental delay (MPMCD) (Myopathy with cataract and combined respiratory chain deficiency; mitochondrial complex deficiency, combined)	GFER	AR	613076
Myopathy, lactic acidosis, and sideroblastic anemia (MLASA) (Mitochondrial myopathy and sideroblastic anemia)	PUS1, YARS2, MT-ATP6	AR/MT	600462 613561 GD: 516060
Myopathy, isolated mitochondrial, autosomal dominant (IMMD)	CHCHD10	AD	616209
Myopathy, mitochondrial, and ataxia (MMYAT)	MSTO1	AR/AD	617675
Mitochondrial myopathy, episodic, with or without optic atrophy and reversible leukoencephalopathy (MEOAL)	FDX2	AR	251900
Mitochondrial myopathy with lactic acidosis (MMLA)	PNPLA8	AR	251950
Mitochondrial myopathy with a defect in mitochondrial-protein transport	Unknown	AR	251945
Myotonic dystrophy-like myopathy; Mitochondrial myopathy	MT-TA	MT	GD: 590000
Mitochondrial myopathy, isolated	MT-TD	MT	GD: 590015
Myopathy, mitochondrial	MT-TW	MT	GD: 590095
Barth Syndrome (BTHS) (Cardioskeletal myopathy with neutropenia and abnormal mitochondria; 3-methylglutaconic aciduria, type II; MGCA2; MGA, type II; MGA2)	TAFAZZIN	X-Linked	302060
Coenzyme Q_{10} deficiency, primary (COQ10D) (CoQ10 deficiency, primary; ubiquinone deficiency; Coenzyme Q deficiency; CoQ deficiency)	COQ2, PDSS1, PDSS2, COQ8A, COQ9, COQ4, COQ7, COQ5	AR	PS607426
Mitochondrial complex I deficiency, nuclear type (MC1DN) (NADH:Q(1) oxidoreductase deficiency; NADH-coenzyme Q reductase deficiency; mitochondrial NADH dehydrogenase component of complex I, deficiency of)	NDUFS2, NDUFB3, NDUFS1, NDUFA10, NDUFAF3, TIMMDC1, ACAD9, NDUFS6, NDUFS4, NDUFAF2, NDUFA2, NDUFAF4, DNAJC30, NDUFAF6, NDUFB9, NDUFA8, NDUFB8, NDUFS3, NDUFV1, NDUFS8, NDUFC2, TMEM126B, FOXRED1, NDUFA9, NDUFA12, NUBPL, NDUFAF1, MTFMT, NDUFB10, NDUFAF8, NDUFV2, NDUFS7, NDUFA11, NDUFB7, NDUFA13, NDUFAF5, NDUFA6, NDUFB11, NDUFA1	AR/XL/XLR	PS252010
Mitochondrial complex II deficiency, nuclear type (MC2DN) (Succinate CoQ reductase deficiency; succinate dehydrogenase deficiency)	SDHA, SDHAF1, SDHD, SDHB	AR	PS252011
cytochrome b of complex III (MTCYB); Exercise intolerance; multisystem disorder; cardiomyopathy, infantile histiocytoid; exercise intolerance, cardiomyopathy, and septooptic dysplasia; parkinsonism/MELAS overlap syndrome	MT-CYB	MT	GD: 516020
Mitochondrial complex III deficiency, nuclear type (MC3DN)	BCS1L, TTC19, UQCRQ, UQCRC2, CYC1, UQCC2, LYRM7, UQCC3, UQCRFS1	AR	PS124000
Mitochondrial complex IV deficiency, nuclear type (MC4DN) (mitochondrial complex IV deficiency; cytochrome c oxidase deficiency; COX deficiency)	SURF1, SCO2, COX10, SCO1, LRPPRC, COX15, COX6B1, TACO1, COX14, COX20, PET100, COA6, COA3, COX8A, COX4I1, APOPT1, COX6A2, PET117, COX5A, COXFA4, COX16, COX11	AR	PS220110
Mitochondrial complex V (ATP synthase) deficiency, nuclear type (MC5DN)	ATPAF2, TMEM70, ATP5F1E, ATP5F1A, ATP5F1D, ATP5MD, ATP5PO	AR/AD	PS604273
Muscular dystrophy, limb-girdle, type 1H (As of 2017 was excluded from LGMD for showing histochemical evidence of being a mitochondrial myopathy, but not yet assigned new nomenclature)	Chromosome 3 (3p23-p25), unknown gene	AD	613530

== Diagnosis ==
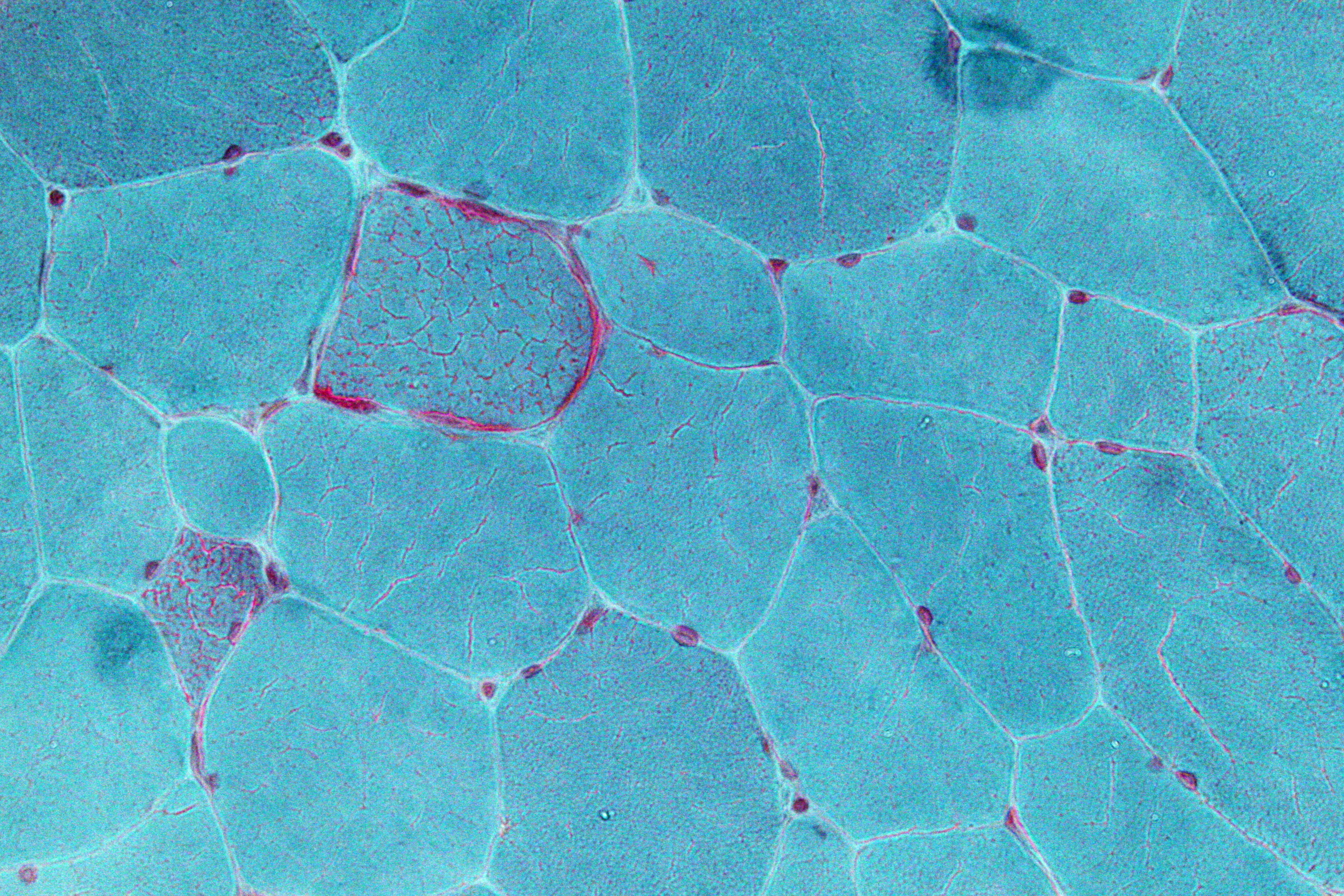
Very high magnification micrograph showing ragged red fibres in a mitochondrial myopathy. Gömöi trichrome stain.

Muscle biopsy: usually ragged red fibres in Gömöri trichrome stain, normal or excessive glycogen or lipid accumulation within these ragged red fibres, histochemical staining showing impairment of respiratory chain such as COX-negative fibres. Some mitochondrial myopathies are limited to disease expression only in skeletal muscle, with fibroblasts (from skin biopsy) appearing normal.

Blood tests: lactate/pyruvate ratio may be elevated or normal, creatine kinase (CK) may be elevated or normal. Electrolyte panel, anion gap, glucose, vitamin D, TSH, anti-HMGCR and AChR autoantibodies to rule-out pseudometabolic myopathies.

Exercise stress test: exaggerated cardiorespiratory response to exercise (inappropriate rapid heart rate response to exercise with breathlessness [tachycardia and dyspnea]).

DNA tests: whole exome sequencing (WES) neuromuscular panels (that only test exons), or whole genome sequencing (WGS) for more complex cases (that test exons, introns, and mitochondrial DNA). Introns were initially thought to be "junk DNA," however, some introns regulate the expression of exons. For example, in the mitochondrial myopathy of hereditary myopathy with lactic acidosis (HML), the most common pathogenic mutation is the intronic IVS5+382 G>C (rs767000507).

There are two groups of DNA that affect the mitochondria: mitochondrial genome (mtDNA) and nuclear DNA. For mitochondrial myopathies that involve a single mtDNA deletion, it would only be found on muscle-derived mtDNA, making a biopsy of affected muscle necessary for DNA analysis rather than saliva or blood. Even among siblings with the same inherited mutation, different muscle groups were affected, with unaffected tissues having near normal levels of mtDNA.

EMG: may be normal, myopathic, or rarely neurogenic.

The symptoms of exercise intolerance, abnormal muscle fatigue, myalgia (muscle pain), arrhythmia, possible fixed proximal muscle weakness, lipid deposits, possible episodes of rhabdomyolysis, with symptoms becoming evident or worsening while fasting, during a fever, during low-intensity aerobic activity or after prolonged activity–all these overlap with the symptoms of another metabolic myopathy, that of fatty acid metabolism disorders.

DNA testing is helpful for determining between the similar presenting, but different in bioenergetic system origin, metabolic myopathies. When DNA testing is inconclusive, a muscle biopsy is necessary.

=== Differential diagnosis ===
Diseases that mimic the symptoms of mitochondrial myopathy include electrolyte imbalance, myasthenia gravis, thyroid abnormalities, vitamin D deficiency, immune-mediated necrotizing myopathy, diabetes-related pseudohypoxia, and fatty acid metabolism disorders. Hypoxia due to ischemia (insufficient tissue oxygenation also impairs oxidative phosphorylation, the process by which mitochondria produce ATP, which can be seen in intermittent claudication, chronic venous insufficiency, and popliteal artery entrapment syndrome. If symptoms of muscle fatigue improve after approximately 10 minutes of low-moderate intensity aerobic exercise, or after approximately 10 minutes of rest following aerobic exercise, this would be indicative of the second wind phenomenon seen in select muscle glycogenoses.

Ragged red fibres (a mitochondrial abnormality) can be found in a number of myopathies other than the inherited primary mitochondrial myopathies. These include axonal Charcot–Marie–Tooth disease types 2CC & 2EE, congenital myasthenic syndrome types 12 & 14, congenital myopathy types 10B & 22A, and MYH7-related myopathies such as Laing distal myopathy and myosin storage myopathy.

Secondary mitochondrial myopathy can be caused by biological aging, inflammatory myopathies, and chronic alcohol use disorder. It can also be due to certain drugs such statins, bupivacaine, antiepileptic drugs (phenytoin, valproic acid, and lamotrigine), and nucleoside reverse transcriptase inhibitors (NRTIs — antiviral drugs) such as zidovudine and clevudine.

Some metabolic myopathies affect multiple bioenergetic pathways, for instance multiple acyl-CoA dehydrogenase deficiency (MADD), formerly known as glutaric acidemia type II (GA-II). The ETF genes involved in MADD impairs beta-oxidation (fatty acid metabolism), impairs amino acid catabolism (protein metabolism), and simultaneously impairs the respiratory chain by not transferring electrons from reduced FAD^{+}/FADH_{2}. The impaired protein metabolism leads to a buildup of glutaric acid and other acids. Fatty acid metabolism is further impaired as carnitine is used to detoxify the buildup of glutaric acid, causing secondary carnitine deficiency. Although MADD affects multiple bioenergetic pathways, it is classified as a fatty acid metabolism disorder as that is the bioenergetic pathway that is affected the most by the deficiency. However, as a differential diagnosis, not only do the symptoms overlap with mitochondrial myopathies, but also muscle biopsies of some individuals with MADD show COX-negative fibres, respiratory chain impairment, and deficiency of coenzyme Q_{10}. Some forms of MADD respond well to riboflavin (vitamin B2), known as riboflavin-responsive MADD (RR-MADD).

Riboflavin-responsive exercise intolerance (RREI), a fatty acid metabolism disorder involving the SLC25A32 gene, has symptoms similar to MADD, with muscle biopsy showing ragged red fibres and lipid deposits (mainly in type I fibres), small type II fibres, and impaired FAD-dependent mitochondrial respiratory chain.

Myopathies involving abnormal autophagy, including abnormal mitophagy, may present with secondary impaired fatty acid metabolism and/or mitochondrial defects in skeletal muscles, may have wide phenotypic variability, and may affect multiple other organs. For instance, EPG5-related Vici syndrome and TANGO2-related disease. TANGO2-related disease is at least partially responsive to B vitamin supplementations of panthotenic acid (B5) and folate (B9).

Pompe disease (glycogen storage disease type II), another type of metabolic myopathy, has secondary mitochondrial dysfunction present in both the earlier onset forms (infantile and juvenile) and the late-onset form in adults.

Myopathies involving the DMD gene, such as Duchenne and Becker muscular dystrophy, have secondary mitochondrial dysfunction impairing oxidative phosphorylation. The mechanisms leading to this mitochondrial dysfunction are many and it has yet to be elucidated which mitochondrial changes are directly due to the disease and which are compensatory. Three unrelated young boys, with a mutation in the DMD gene, exhibited a pseudometabolic presentation with symptoms of exercise intolerance manifesting as exercise-induced myalgia, muscle stiffness, myoglobinuria and rhabdomyolysis.

A few Limb–girdle muscular dystrophies are known to have secondary mitochondrial dysfunction, including: LGMDR1 calpain3-related (formerly LGMD 2A), LGMDR2 dysferlin-related (LGMD 2B), LGMDR3 α-sarcoglycan-related (LGMD 2D), LGMDR5 γ-sarcoglycan-related (LGMD 2C), and LGMDR6 δ-sarcoglycan-related (LGMD 2F). As well as Myofibrillar myopathy 8 (MFM8) PYROXD1-related, which has an adult-onset, slowly progressive, Limb–girdle phenotype.

MICU1-related myopathy with extrapyramidal signs has disrupted calcium uptake causing secondary mitochondrial dysfunction. It has variable myopathic features as well as eye and neurological symptoms.

== Treatment ==
Although no cure currently exists, there is hope in treatment for this class of hereditary diseases as trials continue.

Aerobic training may improve oxidative capacity by the skeletal muscles becoming aerobically conditioned. Deoxynucleoside monophosphates and deoxynucleotide taken orally, may help in TK2 deficiency (Mitochondrial DNA depletion syndrome 2 myopathic type).

Avoiding physically stressful situations that deplete glycogen reserves, such as fasting and endurance exercise (which rely predominantly on oxidative phosphorylation), may help. A high-carb/low-fat/low-protein diet may help.

== See also ==
- Bioenergetic systems
- Metabolic myopathies
