= NDUFS4 =

Protein-coding gene in the species Homo sapiens

Identifiers
- Aliases: NDUFS4, AQDQ, CI-18, CI-18 kDa, CI-AQDQ, NADH:ubiquinone oxidoreductase subunit S4, MC1DN1
- External IDs: OMIM: 602694; MGI: 1343135; GeneCards: NDUFS4

Gene location (Human)
Chr.	Chromosome 5 (human)
Band	5q11.2	Start	53,560,633 bp
Band	5q11.2	End	53,683,338 bp

Gene location (Mouse)
Chr.	Chromosome 13 (mouse)
Band	13|13 D2.2	Start	114,424,331 bp
Band	13|13 D2.2	End	114,524,794 bp
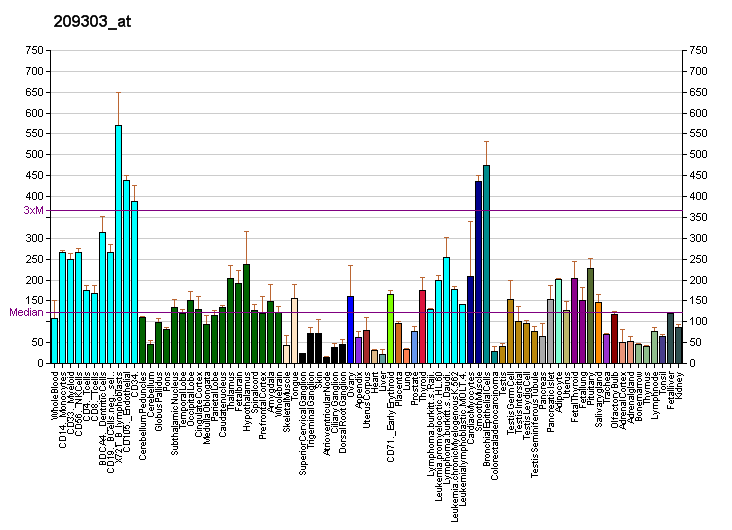
RNA expression pattern
Bgee	Human / Mouse (ortholog); Top expressed in: Achilles tendon; Skeletal muscle tissue of rectus abdominis; muscle of thigh; gastrocnemius muscle; thoracic diaphragm; body of tongue; biceps brachii; left ventricle; apex of heart; Skeletal muscle tissue of biceps brachii / Top expressed in: intercostal muscle; digastric muscle; temporal muscle; right ventricle; muscle of thigh; sternocleidomastoid muscle; right kidney; triceps brachii muscle; ventricular zone; medial ganglionic eminence; More reference expression data
BioGPS	More reference expression data
Gene ontology
Molecular function	oxidoreductase activity, acting on NAD(P)H; NADH dehydrogenase (ubiquinone) activity
Cellular component	membrane; respiratory chain complex I; mitochondrion; mitochondrial inner membrane; respirasome; mitochondrial respiratory chain complex I
Biological process	regulation of protein phosphorylation; positive regulation of fibroblast proliferation; reactive oxygen species metabolic process; mitochondrial respiratory chain complex I assembly; brain development; cellular respiration; response to cAMP; cAMP-mediated signaling; electron transport chain; mitochondrial electron transport, NADH to ubiquinone
Sources:Amigo / QuickGO
Orthologs
Databases	NCBI: entry; OMA: entry
Species	Human	Mouse
Entrez	4724	17993
Ensembl	ENSG00000164258	ENSMUSG00000021764
UniProt	O43181	Q9CXZ1
RefSeq (mRNA)	NM_002495; NM_001318051	NM_010887
RefSeq (protein)	NP_001304980; NP_002486	NP_035017
Location (UCSC)	Chr 5: 53.56 – 53.68 Mb	Chr 13: 114.42 – 114.52 Mb
PubMed search
- Wikidata
View/Edit Human	View/Edit Mouse

NADH dehydrogenase [ubiquinone] iron-sulfur protein 4, mitochondrial (NDUFS4) also known as NADH-ubiquinone oxidoreductase 18 kDa subunit is an enzyme that in humans is encoded by the NDUFS4 gene. This gene encodes a nuclear-encoded accessory subunit of the mitochondrial membrane respiratory chain NADH dehydrogenase (complex I, or NADH:ubiquinone oxidoreductase). Complex I removes electrons from NADH and passes them to the electron acceptor ubiquinone. Mutations in this gene can cause mitochondrial complex I deficiencies such as Leigh syndrome.

== Structure ==
NDUFS4 is located on the q arm of chromosome 5 in position 11.2 and has 8 exons. The NDUFS4 gene produces a 20.1 kDa protein composed of 175 amino acids. NDUFS4, the protein encoded by this gene, is a member of the complex I NDUFS4 subunit family. It is a peripheral membrane protein located on the matrix side of the inner mitochondrial membrane. NDUFS4 is a component of the iron-sulfur (IP) fragment of the enzyme and contains a transit peptide domain, 4 turns, 6 beta strands, and 4 alpha helixes. Alternative splicing results in multiple transcript variants.

== Function ==
Complex I, or NADH:ubiquinone oxidoreductase, the first multisubunit enzyme complex of the mitochondrial respiratory chain, plays a vital role in cellular ATP production, the primary source of energy for many crucial processes in living cells. It removes electrons from NADH and passes them by a series of different protein-coupled redox centers to the electron acceptor ubiquinone. In well-coupled mitochondria, the electron flux leads to ATP generation via the building of a proton gradient across the inner membrane. Complex I is composed of at least 41 subunits, of which 7 are encoded by the mitochondrial genome (ND1-6, ND4L) and the remainder by nuclear genes.

== Clinical significance ==
Mutations in the NDUFS4 gene are associated with Mitochondrial Complex I Deficiency, which is autosomal recessive. This deficiency is the most common enzymatic defect of the oxidative phosphorylation disorders. Mitochondrial complex I deficiency shows extreme genetic heterogeneity and can be caused by mutation in nuclear-encoded genes or in mitochondrial-encoded genes. There are no obvious genotype–phenotype correlations, and inference of the underlying basis from the clinical or biochemical presentation is difficult, if not impossible. However, the majority of cases are caused by mutations in nuclear-encoded genes. It causes a wide range of clinical disorders, ranging from lethal neonatal disease to adult-onset neurodegenerative disorders. Phenotypes include macrocephaly with progressive leukodystrophy, nonspecific encephalopathy, hypertrophic cardiomyopathy, myopathy, liver disease, Leigh syndrome, Leber hereditary optic neuropathy, and some forms of Parkinson disease. Complex I deficiency with autosomal recessive inheritance results from mutation in nuclear-encoded subunit genes, including NDUFV1, NDUFV2, NDUFS1, NDUFS2, NDUFS3, NDUFS6, NDUFS7, NDUFS8, NDUFA2, NDUFA11, NDUFAF3, NDUFAF10, NDUFB3, NDUFB9, ACAD9, FOXRED1, and MTFMT.

== Interactions ==
NDUFS4 has been shown to have 58 binary protein-protein interactions including 57 co-complex interactions. NDUFS4 appears to interact with UBE2G2.
