= NUBPL =

Protein-coding gene in the species Homo sapiens

Identifiers
- Aliases: NUBPL, C14orf127, IND1, huInd1, nucleotide binding protein like, MC1DN21, NUBP iron-sulfur cluster assembly factor, mitochondrial
- External IDs: OMIM: 613621; MGI: 1924076; GeneCards: NUBPL

Gene location (Human)
Chr.	Chromosome 14 (human)
Band	14q12	Start	31,489,956 bp
Band	14q12	End	31,861,224 bp

Gene location (Mouse)
Chr.	Chromosome 12 (mouse)
Band	12|12 C1	Start	52,144,520 bp
Band	12|12 C1	End	52,359,527 bp
RNA expression pattern
Bgee	Human / Mouse (ortholog); Top expressed in: Achilles tendon; Skeletal muscle tissue of biceps brachii; testicle; bronchial epithelial cell; sural nerve; gonad; right auricle of heart; left ventricle; lower lobe of lung; muscle of thigh / Top expressed in: left ventricle; interventricular septum; spinal ganglia; peripheral nervous system; superior cervical ganglion; epiblast; proximal tubule; right kidney; ovary; upper arm; More reference expression data
BioGPS	n/a
Gene ontology
Molecular function	4 iron, 4 sulfur cluster binding; nucleotide binding; iron-sulfur cluster binding; ATP binding; metal ion binding
Cellular component	mitochondrial matrix; mitochondrion; plasma membrane
Biological process	mitochondrion morphogenesis; mitochondrial respiratory chain complex I assembly; iron-sulfur cluster assembly
Sources:Amigo / QuickGO
Orthologs
Databases	NCBI: entry; OMA: entry
Species	Human	Mouse
Entrez	80224	76826
Ensembl	ENSG00000151413	ENSMUSG00000035142
UniProt	Q8TB37	Q9CWD8
RefSeq (mRNA)	NM_001201573; NM_001201574; NM_025152	NM_029760
RefSeq (protein)	NP_001188502; NP_001188503; NP_079428	NP_084036
Location (UCSC)	Chr 14: 31.49 – 31.86 Mb	Chr 12: 52.14 – 52.36 Mb
PubMed search
- Wikidata
View/Edit Human	View/Edit Mouse

Iron-sulfur protein NUBPL (IND1) also known as nucleotide-binding protein-like (NUBPL), IND1 homolog, Nucleotide-binding protein-like or huInd1 is an iron-sulfur (Fe/S) protein that, in humans, is encoded by the NUBPL gene, located on chromosome 14q12. It has an early role in the assembly of the mitochondrial complex I assembly pathway.

== Structure ==
NUBPL is located on the q arm of chromosome 14 in position 12 and has 18 exons. The NUBPL gene produces a 5.9 kDa protein composed of 54 amino acids. The structure of the protein includes a presumed iron-sulfur binding (CxxC) signature, a nucleotide-binding domain which has been highly conserved, and a mitochondrial targeting sequence in the N-terminal. NUBPL is required for the assembly of complex I, which is composed of 45 evolutionally conserved core subunits, including both mitochondrial DNA and nuclear encoded subunits. One of its arms is embedded in the inner membrane of the mitochondria, and the other is embedded in the organelle. The two arms are arranged in an L-shaped configuration. The total molecular weight of the complex is 1MDa.

== Function ==
The NUBPL gene encodes a protein that is a member of the Mrp/NBP35 ATP-binding family. This protein is required for the assembly of the mitochondrial membrane respiratory chain NADH dehydrogenase (Complex I), the first oligomeric enzymatic complex of the mitochondrial respiratory chain located in the inner mitochondrial membrane. Its role in assembly is the delivery of one or more iron–sulfur (Fe-S) clusters to complex I subunits in anaerobic conditions in vitro. The dysfunction of NUBPL results in an irregular assembly of the peripheral arm of complex I, which may lead to a decrease in activity. Knockdown of the protein also causes abnormal mitochondrial ultrastructure characterized by respiratory supercomplex remodeling, christa membrane loss, and abnormally high lactate levels.

== Discovery ==
Sheftel, et al. (2009) used RNA interference (RNAi) to delete the NUBPL gene in yeast (Y. lipolytica). They observed decreased levels and activity of mitochondrial complex I, leading them to conclude that NUBPL is required for complex I assembly and activity. Their experiments showed functional conservation of NUBPL in yeast and humans, an indication that the protein serves an important function. Sheftel, et al. observed structural abnormalities in mitochondria that were NUBPL-depleted mitochondria.

== Clinical significance ==
The absence of NUBPL disrupts the early stage of the mitochondrial complex I assembly pathway. NUBPL-depleted cells were observed to have an abnormal sub complex of proteins normally found in the membrane arm of complex I. A decrease in the presence of complex I subunit proteins, NDUFS1, NDUFV1, NDUFS3, and NDUFA13 indicated a failure of normal complex I assembly. Mitochondrial complex I deficiency involving the dysfunction of the mitochondrial respiratory chain may cause a wide range of clinical manifestations from lethal neonatal disease to adult-onset neurodegenerative disorders. Phenotypes include macrocephaly with progressive leukodystrophy, non-specific encephalopathy, cardiomyopathy, myopathy, liver disease, Leigh syndrome, Leber hereditary optic neuropathy, and some forms of Parkinson disease.

High-throughput DNA sequencing was used to identify variants in 103 candidate genes in 103 patients with mitochondrial complex 1 disorders. Heterozygous variants in the NUBPL were identified in one patient. cDNA complementation studies showed that the variants can cause complex 1 deficiency. The finding in this patient is consistent with autosomal recessive inheritance NUBPL-associated complex I deficiency, and supports the pathogenicity of the variants that were identified. Complex compound heterozygous variants were identified in the NUBPL gene in this patient. In exon 2, a paternally-inherited G>A point mutation (c.166 G>A) resulting in missense substitution of gly56-to-arg (G56R) was observed. Two variants were maternally-inherited: T>C point mutation (c.815-27 T>C) that caused a splicing error and a complex deletion of exons 1-4 and duplication involving exon 7. Two of 232 (1%) control chromosomes were found to have the c.166 G>A pathogenic variant. This individual identified was noted to have motor delays and developmental delay at 2 years of age. He never achieved independent walking. He developed myopathy, nystagmus, ataxia, upper motor neuron signs, and absence seizures. Brain MRI showed leukodystrophy with involvement of the cerebellar cortex and deep white matter. At age 8, he had spasticity, ataxia, and speech problems.

Several patients from with early MRI abnormalities of the cerebellum, deep cerebral white matter and corpus callosum. In this small sample, it was noted that later imaging studies showed improvements to the corpus callosum and cerebral white matter abnormalities, while the cerebellar abnormalities worsen and brainstem abnormalities arise. Using whole exome sequencing, four of the patients had a mitochondrial complex І deficiency identified using other laboratory methods. All four of the patients had compound pathogenic variants in the NUBPL gene.

== Interactions ==
NUBPL has protein-protein interactions with DNAJB11, MTUS2, RNF2, and UFD1L.
