= Diabetes and deafness =

Diabetes and deafness (DAD)
- Other names: Diabetes mellitus and deafness, maternally inherited, (MIDD); Diabetes-deafness syndrome, maternally transmitted; Ballinger-Wallace syndrome; Noninsulin-dependent diabetes mellitus with deafness; Diabetes mellitus, type II, with deafness
- This condition is inherited via a mitochondrial inheritance manner
- Symptoms: Noninsulin-dependent diabetes, deafness, may also have systemic symptoms including eye, muscle, brain, kidney, heart, and gastrointestinal abnormalities, rarely endocrine abnormalities and osteoporosis
- Causes: Mutation in either MT-TL1, MT-TE, or MT-TK
- Differential diagnosis: Mitochondrial disease

Diabetes and deafness (DAD) or maternally inherited diabetes and deafness (MIDD) or mitochondrial diabetes is a subtype of diabetes which is caused from a mutation in mitochondrial DNA, which consists of a circular genome. It is associated with the genes MT-TL1, MT-TE, and MT-TK. The point mutation at position 3243A>G, in gene MT-TL1 encoding tRNA leucine 1, is most common. Because mitochondrial DNA is contributed to the embryo by the oocyte and not by spermatozoa, this disease is inherited from maternal family members only. As indicated by the name, MIDD is characterized by diabetes and sensorineural hearing loss. Some individuals also experience more systemic symptoms including eye, muscle, brain, kidney, heart, and gastrointestinal abnormalities, similar to other mitochondrial diseases.

== Signs and symptoms ==
As suggested by the name, patients with MIDD are subject to sensorineural hearing loss. This begins with a reduction in the perception of frequencies above approximately 5 kHz which progressively declines, over the years, to severe hearing loss at all frequencies. The diabetes that accompanies the hearing loss can be similar to Type 1 diabetes or Type 2 diabetes; however, Type 1-like diabetes is the more common form of the two. MIDD has also been associated with a number of other issues including kidney dysfunction, gastrointestinal problems, and cardiomyopathy.

In the eye, MIDD is characterized by progressive atrophy of the retinal pigment epithelium. Initially, the fovea is spared. Thus, patients often have good visual acuity. However, over time the areas of atrophy expand with eventual loss of central vision.

Table 1: Metabolically active organs that can be affected by the mitochondrial point mutation and the associated complication:

Organ affected	Associated complication
Ear (cochlea)	Sensorineural hearing loss
Brain (Hypothalamus)	Short stature
Brain (general)	Strokes, seizures, atrophy of cerebellum or cerebrum, ataxia, central nervous system disease, encephalatrophy, basal ganglia calcification, migraine, cerebral infarction, dysarthria
Eye	Macular pattern dystrophy, macular degeneration, proliferated retinopathy, external ophthalmoplegia, ptosis
Heart	Congestive heart failure, ventricular hypertrophy, arrhythmia
Kidney	Focal segmental glomerulosclerosis, nephropathy
Intestine	Malabsorption or constipation
Muscle	Mitochondrial myopathy, peripheral neuropathy
Testes	Hypogonadism
Adrenal glands	Hypoaldosteronism
Bones	Osteoporosis

== Genetics ==
=== Penetrance and age of onset ===
MIDD represents 1% of people who have diabetes. Over 85% of people that carry the mutation in mitochondrial DNA at position 3243 present symptoms of diabetes. The average age at which people who have MIDD are typically diagnosed is 37 years old but has been seen to range anywhere between 11 years to 68 years old. Of these people with diabetes carrying the mitochondrial DNA mutation at position 3243, 75% experience sensorineural hearing loss. In these cases, hearing loss normally appears before the onset of diabetes and is marked by a decrease in perception of high tone frequencies. The associated hearing loss with diabetes is typically more common and more quickly declining in men than in women.

=== Effect of mutation on tRNALeu(UUR) ===
Mitochondria have their own circular genome which contains 37 genes, of which 22 code for tRNAs. These tRNAs play an essential role in protein synthesis by transporting amino acids to the ribosome. MIDD is caused by an A to G substitution in the mitochondrial DNA at position 3243, which encodes tRNALeu(UUR). This mutation is typically in heteroplasmic form. A mutation in this gene (A3243G) causes the native conformation to be destabilized, as well as dimerization in the tRNALeu(UUR). The uridine at the anticodon first position of the tRNALeu(UUR) is normally post- transcriptionally modified to ensure correct codon recognition. Such modification is known as taurine modification, which is decreased as a result of the improper structure of the tRNALeu(UUR). Incorrect tRNALeu(UUR) structure also results in decreased aminoacylation. The mutation has also been shown to result in decreased function of the tRNA and thus protein synthesis.

=== Diabetes characteristics ===
The A3243G mutation in mitochondrial DNA can be present in any tissue, however, it is more commonly present in tissues with lower replication rates such as muscle. The presence of this mutation can lead to decreased oxygen consumption as a result of reduced function of the respiratory chain and a decrease in oxidative phosphorylation. In some people, this reduction in function of the respiratory chain is suggested to be caused by unbalanced amounts of proteins that are encoded by mitochondrial DNA, due to the presence of the A3243G mutation. However, in other people, the same amount of mitochondrial proteins are generated, but their stability is compromised due to the improper incorporation of amino acids at the UUR codons of the mitochondrial mRNAs. This is a result of the mutated tRNALeu(UUR) with its decreased function in protein synthesis. A decrease in function of the respiratory chain as a result of a mitochondrial DNA mutation could result in a decrease of ATP production. This decrease in ATP could have detrimental effects on other processes in the body. One such process is insulin secretion by pancreatic Beta-cells. In pancreatic Beta-cells, precise levels of ATP/ADP regulate the opening and closing of the KATP channel, which controls the secretion of insulin. When mutations in the mitochondria disrupt the ATP/ADP ratio, this channel cannot function properly and this can result in a person being deficient in insulin. Since the age of onset is later in a person's life, it has been suggested that age plays a role in contributing, along with the reduced ATP/ADP ratio, to the slow deterioration of the function of B-cells.

=== Deafness characteristics ===
Hearing loss, as caused by the 3243 mitochondrial DNA mutation, is seen in the form of progressive cochlear dysfunction. Although the mechanism by which the mutation in the tRNALeu(UUR) causes this dysfunction of the cochlea is still under investigation, it has been hypothesized that it involves the ion pumps required for sound transduction. As the mutation in the tRNALeu(UUR) leads to unbalanced amounts or unstable respiratory chain enzymes, respiration and oxidative phosphorylation are reduced, leading to lower levels of ATP. Naturally, the most metabolically active organs in a person will be affected by this ATP deficiency. Included in these metabolically active organs is the cochlear stria vascularis. The stria vascularis and the hair cells, both essential to sound transduction, make use of ion pumps to regulate the concentration of ions including K+, Na+, and Ca2+ using ATP. Without sufficient levels of ATP, these concentration gradients are not maintained and this can lead to cell death in both the stria vascularis and the hair cells, causing hearing loss.

=== Renal impairment ===
Renal impairment is common is MIDD, either as a complication of diabetes or as a distinct renal disease including FSGS. In some cases, MIDD-related renal impairment may progress to end-stage kidney disease. There is an association between peripheral leucocyte heteroplasmy and the age of renal replacement therapy.

== Diagnosis ==
Physical exams, blood tests, family history, biopsy, DNA testing. Mutations in mitochondrial genes MT-TE, MT-TL1, and MT-TK have been associated with MIDD. The most common mutation is the 3243A>G transition in the mitochondrial tRNA-leucine 1 gene (MT-TL1).

== Treatment ==
=== Initial ===
Initially, the person is treated by dietary changes and hypoglycaemic agents. This does not last long before the person has to be started on insulin (within 2 years of diagnosis).

== See also ==
- Deafness
- Diabetes
