= UQCC3 =

Protein-coding gene in the species Homo sapiens

Identifiers
- Aliases: UQCC3, C11orf83, CCDS41658.1, UNQ655, MC3DN9, ubiquinol-cytochrome c reductase complex assembly factor 3
- External IDs: OMIM: 616097; MGI: 2147553; GeneCards: UQCC3

Gene location (Human)
Chr.	Chromosome 11 (human)
Band	11q12.3	Start	62,670,273 bp
Band	11q12.3	End	62,673,686 bp

Gene location (Mouse)
Chr.	Chromosome 19 (mouse)
Band	19|19 A	Start	8,857,378 bp
Band	19|19 A	End	8,858,287 bp
RNA expression pattern
Bgee	Human / Mouse (ortholog); Top expressed in: endothelial cell; skin of arm; mucosa of transverse colon; gingival epithelium; gonad; tendon of biceps brachii; palpebral conjunctiva; parotid gland; right adrenal cortex; muscle of thigh / Top expressed in: neural layer of retina; yolk sac; morula; right kidney; muscle of thigh; triceps brachii muscle; proximal tubule; embryo; temporal muscle; medial head of gastrocnemius muscle; More reference expression data
BioGPS	n/a
Gene ontology
Molecular function	phosphatidic acid binding; cardiolipin binding
Cellular component	mitochondrial respiratory chain complex III; mitochondrial inner membrane; integral component of membrane; membrane; mitochondrion; integral component of mitochondrial inner membrane
Biological process	mitochondrial electron transport, ubiquinol to cytochrome c; cristae formation; ATP biosynthetic process; mitochondrial respiratory chain complex III assembly
Sources:Amigo / QuickGO
Orthologs
Databases	NCBI: entry; OMA: entry
Species	Human	Mouse
Entrez	790955	107197
Ensembl	ENSG00000204922	ENSMUSG00000071654
UniProt	Q6UW78	Q8K2T4
RefSeq (mRNA)	NM_001085372	NM_001160356
RefSeq (protein)	NP_001078841	NP_001153828
Location (UCSC)	Chr 11: 62.67 – 62.67 Mb	Chr 19: 8.86 – 8.86 Mb
PubMed search
- Wikidata
View/Edit Human	View/Edit Mouse

Ubiquinol-cytochrome c reductase complex assembly factor 3 is a protein that in humans is encoded by the UQCC3 gene. Located in mitochondria, this protein is involved in the assembly of mitochondrial Complex III, stabilizing supercomplexes containing Complex III. Mutations in the UQCC3 gene cause Complex III deficiency with symptoms of hypoglycemia, hypotonia, lactic acidosis, and developmental delays. This protein plays an important role as an antiviral factor, bolstering the ability of cells to inhibit viral replication, independent of interferon production. The UQCC3 protein can be cleaved by OMA1 metalloprotease during mitochondrial depolarization, targeting the cell for apoptosis. Depletion of this protein alters cardiolipin composition, causing cellular and mitochondrial defects.

== Structure ==
The UQCC3 gene is located on the q arm of chromosome 11 in position 12.3 and spans 2,036 base pairs. The gene produces a 10.1 kDa protein composed of 93 amino acids. This protein faces the intermembrane space. It possesses an N-terminal signal peptide and a signal transmembrane structure, in addition to several phosphorylation sites. The secondary structure of this protein is made up mostly of random coils and alpha helices. Alpha helices 2 and 3 bind to cardiolipin.

== Function ==
The UQCC3 gene encodes a protein that functions in complex III assembly, downstream of assembly factors UQCC1 and UQCC2. This is evidenced by the observation that UQCC3 levels are reduced in cells with decreased levels of UQCC1 and UQCC2, but lack of the UQCC3 protein does not affect levels of UQCC1 and UQCC2. Predicted to be a secretary protein with small molecular weight, this protein has important functions in cellular proliferation and antiviral innate immune regulation. Expression of this protein is ubiquitous in carcinomas, along with normal tissues. During the early stages of Complex III assembly, the UQCC3 protein stabilizes supercomplexes containing Complex III, most notably the III_{2}/IV supercomplex.

== Clinical Significance ==
In the sole recorded case of a mutation in the UQCC3 gene, a patient with a homozygous missense mutation presented with nuclear type 9 complex III deficiency, displaying symptoms of hypoglycemia, hypotonia, lactic acidosis, severe delayed psychomotor development, and other developmental delay. The patient also had decreased levels of cytochrome b within Complex III.

The UQCC3 protein also has a role as an antiviral factor, independent of interferon production. Levels of this protein increase in response to a viral infection, improving the ability of cells to inhibit viral replication. Overexpression of the UQCC3 gene increases transcription of OAS3 while knockdown of RNase L or OAS3 hampers the antiviral effect of UQCC3. Signaling from UQCC3 to the OAS-RNase L system is independent of interferon production. This protein is also regulated by expression of the double-stranded RNA-dependent protein kinase EIF2AK2.

Depleted levels of the UQCC3 protein cause impaired respiration and subtle yet significant alterations in cardiolipin composition, which then result in abnormal crista morphology, increased sensitivity to apoptosis, and decreased levels of ATP. Furthermore, mitochondrial depolarization causes OMA1 metalloprotease to cleave the UQCC3 protein; effectively, this mechanism targets cells with damaged mitochondria for apoptosis.

== Interactions ==
This protein associates with the rest of mitochondrial Complex III and has protein-protein interactions with PHLDA3.
