= György Gömöri (histochemist) =

Hungarian-American physician (1904–1957)

György Gömöri (also George Gömöri or George Gomori; 16 July 1904 – 28 February 1957) was a Hungarian-American physician who became famous as a histochemist.

Gömöri was born in Budapest on 16 July 1904. He received a degree from the medical faculty of the Pázmány Péter University (today the medical faculty of the Semmelweis University) in 1928. In 1928 he became a pathologist at the 1st Department of Pathology, and in 1932 a surgeon at the 3rd Department of Surgery. In 1938 he went to the United States. First, he worked in a private hospital, but in the same year he became Assistant in Medicine at the University of Chicago as pathologist. He received a Doctor of Philosophy degree from that university in 1943. He became professor of internal medicine specialized in thoracic diseases in 1949. He took a main role in the foundation of the Histochemical Society in 1950. In 1956, Gömöri went to the Palo Alto Medical Center and Medical Research Foundation, where he worked the rest of his life. First he studied the special histological structure of bone, but histochemistry soon became his main field of research, which made him world-famous. He developed the Gömöri trichrome stain and Gömöri methenamine silver stain.

Gömöri died at his home in Palo Alto, California, in 1957 following a heart attack.

== Sources ==
- Gömöri György - História Tudósnaptár
- Gyorgy Gömöri - George Gomori - Gomery One-Name Study
