= MGME1 =

Protein-coding gene in the species Homo sapiens

Identifiers
- Aliases: MGME1, C20orf72, DDK1, MTDPS11, bA504H3.4, mitochondrial genome maintenance exonuclease 1
- External IDs: OMIM: 615076; MGI: 1921778; GeneCards: MGME1

Gene location (Human)
Chr.	Chromosome 20 (human)
Band	20p11.23	Start	17,969,018 bp
Band	20p11.23	End	17,991,122 bp

Gene location (Mouse)
Chr.	Chromosome 2 (mouse)
Band	2|2 G1	Start	144,112,583 bp
Band	2|2 G1	End	144,123,147 bp
RNA expression pattern
Bgee	Human / Mouse (ortholog); Top expressed in: skin of arm; myocardium of left ventricle; cardiac muscle tissue of right atrium; ventricular zone; human penis; amniotic fluid; skin of thigh; gingival epithelium; trabecular bone; deltoid muscle / Top expressed in: interventricular septum; gastrula; epiblast; embryo; morula; right kidney; blastocyst; proximal tubule; yolk sac; muscle of thigh; More reference expression data
BioGPS	n/a
Gene ontology
Molecular function	nuclease activity; single-stranded DNA exodeoxyribonuclease activity; exonuclease activity; hydrolase activity
Cellular component	mitochondrion
Biological process	mitochondrial DNA replication; mitochondrial DNA repair; mitochondrial genome maintenance; DNA repair; nucleic acid phosphodiester bond hydrolysis; cellular response to DNA damage stimulus
Sources:Amigo / QuickGO
Orthologs
Databases	NCBI: entry; OMA: entry
Species	Human	Mouse
Entrez	92667	74528
Ensembl	ENSG00000125871	ENSMUSG00000027424
UniProt	Q9BQP7	Q9CXC3
RefSeq (mRNA)	NM_001310338; NM_001310339; NM_052865; NM_001363738	NM_001289630; NM_001289631; NM_028984; NM_001355688
RefSeq (protein)	NP_001297267; NP_001297268; NP_443097; NP_001350667	NP_001276559; NP_001276560; NP_083260; NP_001342617
Location (UCSC)	Chr 20: 17.97 – 17.99 Mb	Chr 2: 144.11 – 144.12 Mb
PubMed search
- Wikidata
View/Edit Human	View/Edit Mouse

Mitochondrial genome maintenance exonuclease 1, abbreviated as MGME1, is an enzyme that in humans is encoded by the MGME1 gene. MGME1 is a 344 amino acids long protein belonging to the PD-(D/E)XK family of nucleases. It localizes to mitochondria where it is important for maintenance of the mitochondrial genome. Loss of function mutations in MGME1 lead to defects in mitochondrial DNA, including mitochondrial DNA depletion, duplications, deletions and increased replication intermediates. Also, there is an accumulation of 7S DNA, a short single stranded linear DNA strand. MGME1 deficiency in humans leads to multisystemic mitochondrial disease.

== Function ==
The activity of MGME1 has been studied using the purified protein in cell-free in vitro assays. Together these studies suggest that MGME1 functions to remove single stranded nucleotide flaps that arise during mitochondrial DNA replication and/or DNA repair. MGME1 has a strong preference for cutting single stranded DNA, with weak activity on duplex DNA, and no activity on RNA. It acts as an endo-/exonuclease, requiring a free 5´or 3´ end for cleavage. MGME1 can cut 5´ flap substrates that mimic primer/repair intermediates. Moreover, MGME1 removes single stranded 5´-flaps in reconstituted mitochondrial DNA replication assays where it is required to enable ligation of the newly synthesized strand.
