= MT-TL1 =

Transfer RNA in the species Homo sapiens

mitochondrially encoded tRNA leucine 1 (UUA/G)

Identifiers
- Symbol: MT-TL1
- Alt. symbols: MTTL1
- NCBI gene: 4567
- HGNC: 7490
- OMIM: 590050
- RefSeq: NC_001807

Other data
- Locus: Chr. MT

Mitochondrially encoded tRNA leucine 1 (UUA/G) also known as MT-TL1 is a transfer RNA which in humans is encoded by the mitochondrial MT-TL1 gene.

== Structure ==
The MT-TL1 gene is located on the p arm of the mitochondrial DNA at position 12 and it spans 75 base pairs. The structure of a tRNA molecule is a distinctive folded structure which contains three hairpin loops and resembles a three-leafed clover.

== Function ==
MT-TL1 is a small 75 nucleotide RNA (human mitochondrial map position 3230–3304) that transfers the amino acid leucine to a growing polypeptide chain at the ribosome site of protein synthesis during translation. Also, some studies showed that the MT-TL1 gene pathogenic variants could be attributed to the alterations of mTERF binding efficiency.

== Clinical significance ==
=== MELAS syndrome ===
Mutations in MT-TL1 can result in multiple mitochondrial deficiencies and associated disorders. It is associated with mitochondrial encephalomyopathy, lactic acidosis, and stroke-like episodes (MELAS). MELAS is a rare mitochondrial disorder known to affect many parts of the body, especially the nervous system and the brain. Symptoms of MELAS include recurrent severe headaches, muscle weakness (myopathy), hearing loss, stroke-like episodes with a loss of consciousness, seizures, and other problems affecting the nervous system. A common mutation is A3243G. This mutation has been theorized to be associated with several other mitochondrial diseases, including diabetes mellitus and deafness. Diabetes mellitus and deafness is characterized by diabetes combined with hearing loss, particularly of high pitches. Additional symptoms include muscle weakness (myopathy) and various problems with a patient's eyes, heart, or kidneys.

Other rare point variants on MT-TL1 gene were also described: m.3271 T > C, m.3291 T > C, m.3303 C > T, m.3256 C > T, and m.3260 A>G.

=== Complex i deficiency ===
MT-TP mutations may result in complex I deficiency of the mitochondrial respiratory chain, which may cause a wide variety of signs and symptoms affecting many organs and systems of the body, particularly the nervous system, the heart, and the muscles used for movement (skeletal muscles). These signs and symptoms can appear at any time from birth to adulthood. Phenotypes of the condition include encephalopathy, epilepsy, dystonia, hypotonia, myalgia, exercise intolerance, and more. A 3302A>G mutation has been found in a patient with the deficiency.

=== Endocrine dysfunction ===
Certain mitocondrial symptoms are commonly reported along with endocrine dysfunction. Those with MT-TL1 mutation symptoms, such as MIDD and MELAS, may develop hormone deficiencies or have hindered endocrine development.

== See also ==
- Mitochondrial DNA
- Mitochondrial Myopathies
