= GFER syndrome =

Rare disease

- GFER syndrome is inherited via autosomal recessive manner
- Symptoms: Congenital cataracts, loss of motor abilities, development delay, degeneration of organs, sometimes hearing loss
- Causes: Caused by a mutation in the nuclear GFER gene

GFER syndrome (also called GFER disease) is a rare mitochondrial disease. GFER was first reported in 2009 and since exome sequencing became more available, more cases were discovered. In all known cases, the disease progresses with conditions that include: congenital cataracts, loss of motor abilities, development delay, degeneration of organs, sometimes hearing loss, etc.

== Cause ==
The disease is inherited in an autosomal recessive pattern and is caused by a mutation in the nuclear GFER gene (also called ALR; Erv1 homolog in yeast).

== Mechanism ==
The most major role of GFER is inside the mitochondrial intermembrane space (mitochondrial IMS) (it is imported into the mitochondria from the cytosol). If we describe the normal pathway as follows:

1. Cysteine rich subtracts (CX3C, CX9C) which are in the cytosol enter into inter-membrane space via the TOM.
2. These subtracts are processed by Mia40 protein which folds them. In each fold an SS bond is formed and an electron is taken (through the H atom) into the Mia40. Only in the folded form these folded proteins can further enter to the mitochondria's matrix.
3. GFER takes the electron from Mia40 and transfer it to cytochrome c.

Otherwise, when the GFER does not take the electron:

1. ETC efficiency will decrease.
2. Mia40 will be "saturated" and will not be able to fold the subtracts. These unfolded proteins will not be able to enter the matrix and therefore:
  1. The mitochondria will lack various building blocks and its ability to maintain itself will be hindered (e.g., It will not be able to produce cytochrome c oxidase and other building blocks for the ETC, maintenance, correction of errors and splitting).
  2. The IMS will become bloated with partially folded proteins with structural damage. This damage may cause cytochrome c depletion and lead to apoptosis.
  3. Mia40 and the partially folded protein may free their electrons, eventually, as free radical which hinders the mitochondria, including its DNA, until it cannot repair itself.
3. Mitochondrial unfolded protein response will be initiated.

GFER has a few more roles which may be affected, with dependence on the mutation type and location. These include:

- Mitochondrial fission regulation by inhibition of Drp1.
- GFER, acts as an augmentor of liver regeneration.
- GFER interacts with various protein as a regulator of cell apoptosis process.

== Treatment ==
Currently there is no curative treatment.
