= MTFMT =

Protein-coding gene in the species Homo sapiens

Identifiers
- Aliases: MTFMT, COXPD15, FMT1, mitochondrial methionyl-tRNA formyltransferase, MC1DN27
- External IDs: OMIM: 611766; MGI: 1916856; HomoloGene: 12320; GeneCards: MTFMT; OMA:MTFMT - orthologs

Gene location (Human)
Chr.	Chromosome 15 (human)
Band	15q22.31	Start	65,001,512 bp
Band	15q22.31	End	65,029,639 bp

Gene location (Mouse)
Chr.	Chromosome 9 (mouse)
Band	9|9 C	Start	65,343,064 bp
Band	9|9 C	End	65,360,336 bp
RNA expression pattern
Bgee	Human / Mouse (ortholog); Top expressed in: myocardium of left ventricle; buccal mucosa cell; cardiac muscle tissue of right atrium; gastrocnemius muscle; mucosa of transverse colon; gonad; tibial arteries; right auricle of heart; stromal cell of endometrium; muscle of thigh / Top expressed in: medullary collecting duct; proximal tubule; renal corpuscle; right kidney; secondary oocyte; primary oocyte; yolk sac; spermatocyte; ventricular zone; gastrula; More reference expression data
BioGPS	n/a
Gene ontology
Molecular function	transferase activity; hydroxymethyl-, formyl- and related transferase activity; catalytic activity; methionyl-tRNA formyltransferase activity
Cellular component	mitochondrion
Biological process	conversion of methionyl-tRNA to N-formyl-methionyl-tRNA; biosynthesis; protein biosynthesis; translational initiation
Sources:Amigo / QuickGO
Orthologs
Species	Human	Mouse
Entrez	123263	69606
Ensembl	ENSG00000103707	ENSMUSG00000059183
UniProt	Q96DP5	Q9D799
RefSeq (mRNA)	NM_139242	NM_027134
RefSeq (protein)	NP_640335	NP_081410
Location (UCSC)	Chr 15: 65 – 65.03 Mb	Chr 9: 65.34 – 65.36 Mb
PubMed search
- Wikidata
View/Edit Human	View/Edit Mouse

Mitochondrial methionyl-tRNA formyltransferase is a protein that in humans is encoded by the MTFMT gene.

The protein encoded by this nuclear gene localizes to the mitochondrion, where it catalyzes the formylation of methionyl-tRNA. Recessive-type mutations in MTFMT have been shown to cause mitochondrial disease.
