= MT-TE =

Transfer RNA

mitochondrially encoded tRNA glutamic acid

Identifiers
- Symbol: MT-TE
- Alt. symbols: MTTE
- NCBI gene: 4556
- HGNC: 7479
- RefSeq: NC_001807

Other data
- Locus: Chr. MT

Mitochondrially encoded tRNA glutamic acid also known as MT-TE is a transfer RNA which in humans is encoded by the mitochondrial MT-TE gene. MT-TE is a small 69 nucleotide RNA (human mitochondrial map position 14674–14742) that transfers the amino acid glutamic acid to a growing polypeptide chain at the ribosome site of protein synthesis during translation.

== Structure ==
The MT-TE gene is located on the p arm of the mitochondrial DNA at position 12 and it spans 68 base pairs. The structure of a tRNA molecule is a distinctive folded structure which contains three hairpin loops and resembles a three-leafed clover.

== Function ==
The MT-TE gene encodes for a transfer RNA (tRNA), which are chemical cousins of DNA responsible for assembling amino acids into functioning proteins. MT-TE codes for a specific tRNA called tRNAGlu. tRNAGlu is responsible for attaching to glutamic acid (Glu) and inserting it into the specific locations of the growing peptide during protein assembly. The tRNAGlu molecule is localized to the mitochondria, and is involved in the assembly of oxidative phosphorylation proteins.

== Clinical significance ==
Mutations in MT-TE can result in mitochondrial deficiencies and associated disorders.

=== Maternally inherited diabetes and deafness ===
A mutation in the MT-TE gene has been found in a small number of people with maternally inherited diabetes and deafness (MIDD). People with this condition have diabetes and sometimes hearing loss, particularly of high tones. Affected individuals may also have muscle weakness (myopathy) and problems with their eyes, heart, or kidneys. This mutation likely impairs the ability of mitochondria to help trigger insulin release. In affected individuals, diabetes results when the beta cells do not produce enough insulin to regulate blood sugar effectively. Researchers have not determined how such mutations lead to hearing loss or the other features of MIDD.

The mutation involved in this condition replaces the DNA building block (nucleotide) thymine with the nucleotide cytosine at position 14709 (written as T14709C). A family with a mutation of 14709T>C in the MT-TE gene showed phenotypes of congenital myopathy, mental retardation, cerebellar ataxia, and diabetes mellitus. Another patient with the same mutation was found to have Diabetes mellitus type 1 with severe myopathy, a high frequency deafness (hearing impairment) which suggested maternal inheritance.

=== Infantile transient mitochondrial myopathy ===
Infantile transient mitochondrial myopathy, also known as benign COX deficiency myopathy, is a rare disease which occurs within the infantile stages of life. The myopathy is characterized by clinical manifestations such as severe muscle weakness, hypotonia (poor muscle tone), and lactic acidosis (a buildup of lactic acid in the body). Affected infants often require support from a machine for breathing and have difficulties feeding. However, the signs and symptoms have been shown to improve after several months, and most affected individuals show no symptoms of the condition by age 2 or 3.

The mutations involved in infantile transient mitochondrial myopathy change single nucleotides in mitochondrial DNA. These mutations impair oxidative phosphorylation. As a result, muscle cells cannot produce enough energy, leading to the muscle problems that affect infants with infantile transient mitochondrial myopathy. It is unknown why only muscles are involved or how affected infants recover from the condition. Specific mutations of 14674T>G and 14674T>C have been observed in patients with the myopathy.

=== Complex IV deficiency ===
MT-TE mutations have been associated with complex IV deficiency of the mitochondrial respiratory chain, also known as the cytochrome c oxidase deficiency. Cytochrome c oxidase deficiency is a rare genetic condition that can affect multiple parts of the body, including skeletal muscles, the heart, the brain, or the liver. Common clinical manifestations include myopathy, hypotonia, and encephalomyopathy, lactic acidosis, and hypertrophic cardiomyopathy. A 14680C>A substitution mutation was found in a patient with the deficiency.
