= COQ4 =

Protein-coding gene in humans

Identifiers
- Aliases: COQ4, CGI-92, COQ10D7, coenzyme Q4
- External IDs: OMIM: 612898; MGI: 1098826; GeneCards: COQ4
Enzyme activity
EC #	BRENDA	ExPASy	KEGG	MetaCyc
4.1.1.130	↗	↗	↗	↗

Gene location (Human)
Chr.	Chromosome 9 (human)
Band	9q34.11	Start	128,322,544 bp
Band	9q34.11	End	128,334,072 bp

Gene location (Mouse)
Chr.	Chromosome 2 (mouse)
Band	2 B|2 20.62 cM	Start	29,677,505 bp
Band	2 B|2 20.62 cM	End	29,687,947 bp
RNA expression pattern
Bgee	Human / Mouse (ortholog); Top expressed in: right uterine tube; olfactory zone of nasal mucosa; anterior pituitary; right lobe of thyroid gland; left lobe of thyroid gland; body of pancreas; mucosa of transverse colon; right adrenal cortex; skin of leg; skin of abdomen / Top expressed in: spermatocyte; spermatid; right kidney; embryo; proximal tubule; granulocyte; seminiferous tubule; embryo; epiblast; condyle; More reference expression data
BioGPS	n/a
Gene ontology
Molecular function	protein binding
Cellular component	membrane; mitochondrion; mitochondrial inner membrane; protein-containing complex; extrinsic component of mitochondrial inner membrane
Biological process	ubiquinone biosynthetic process
Sources:Amigo / QuickGO
Orthologs
Databases	NCBI: entry; OMA: entry
Species	Human	Mouse
Entrez	51117	227683
Ensembl	ENSG00000167113	ENSMUSG00000026798
UniProt	Q9Y3A0	Q8BGB8
RefSeq (mRNA)	NM_001305942; NM_016035	NM_178693
RefSeq (protein)	NP_001292871; NP_057119	NP_848808
Location (UCSC)	Chr 9: 128.32 – 128.33 Mb	Chr 2: 29.68 – 29.69 Mb
PubMed search
- Wikidata
View/Edit Human	View/Edit Mouse

Ubiquinone biosynthesis protein COQ4 homolog, mitochondrial is a protein that in humans is encoded by the COQ4 gene.
