= NDUFS6 =

Protein-coding gene in the species Homo sapiens

Identifiers
- Aliases: NDUFS6, CI-13kA, CI-13kD-A, CI13KDA, NADH:ubiquinone oxidoreductase subunit S6, MC1DN9
- External IDs: OMIM: 603848; MGI: 3648526; GeneCards: NDUFS6

Gene location (Human)
Chr.	Chromosome 5 (human)
Band	5p15.33	Start	1,801,407 bp
Band	5p15.33	End	1,816,048 bp

Gene location (Mouse)
Chr.	Chromosome 7 (mouse)
Band	7|7 D3	Start	80,811,145 bp
Band	7|7 D3	End	80,811,492 bp
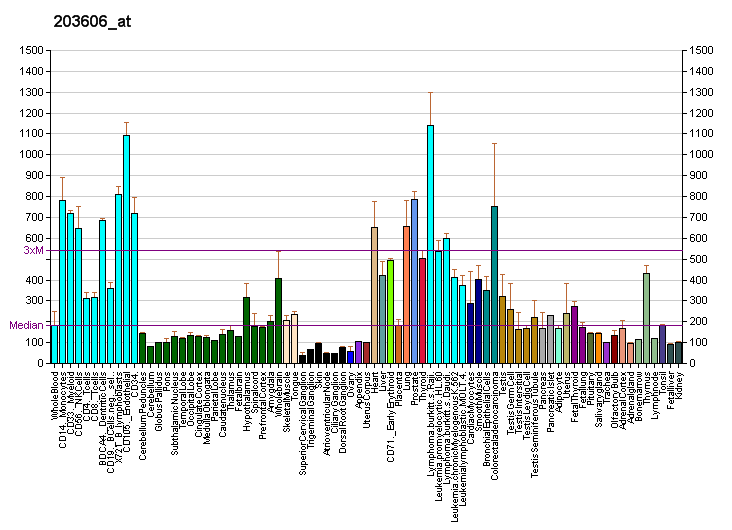
RNA expression pattern
Bgee	Human / Mouse (ortholog); Top expressed in: tendon of biceps brachii; apex of heart; right auricle of heart; gingival epithelium; mucosa of transverse colon; left ventricle; endothelial cell; muscle of thigh; gastrocnemius muscle; right ventricle / Top expressed in: embryo; embryo; morula; blastocyst; yolk sac; human kidney; skeletal muscle tissue; proximal tubule; adrenal gland; colon; More reference expression data
BioGPS	More reference expression data
Gene ontology
Molecular function	electron transfer activity; NADH dehydrogenase (ubiquinone) activity
Cellular component	mitochondrial inner membrane; respirasome; membrane; mitochondrion; mitochondrial respiratory chain complex I
Biological process	muscle contraction; mitochondrion morphogenesis; reproductive system development; fatty acid metabolic process; multicellular organism growth; multicellular organism aging; mitochondrial respiratory chain complex I assembly; respiratory electron transport chain; mitochondrial electron transport, NADH to ubiquinone
Sources:Amigo / QuickGO
Orthologs
Databases	NCBI: entry; OMA: entry
Species	Human	Mouse
Entrez	4726	623286
Ensembl	ENSG00000145494	ENSMUSG00000083820
UniProt	O75380	n/a
RefSeq (mRNA)	NM_004553	XM_036153659
RefSeq (protein)	NP_004544	n/a
Location (UCSC)	Chr 5: 1.8 – 1.82 Mb	Chr 7: 80.81 – 80.81 Mb
PubMed search
- Wikidata
View/Edit Human	View/Edit Mouse

NADH dehydrogenase [ubiquinone] iron-sulfur protein 6, mitochondrial is an enzyme that in humans is encoded by the NDUFS6 gene.

== Function ==
The multisubunit NADH:ubiquinone oxidoreductase (complex I) is the first enzyme complex in the electron transport chain of mitochondria. The iron-sulfur protein (IP) fraction is made up of 7 subunits, including NDUFS6.

== Clinical significance ==
Mutations in the NDUFS6 gene are associated with mitochondrial Complex I deficiency, and are inherited in an autosomal recessive manner. This deficiency is the most common enzymatic defect of the oxidative phosphorylation disorders. Mitochondrial complex I deficiency shows extreme genetic heterogeneity and can be caused by mutation in nuclear-encoded genes or in mitochondrial-encoded genes. There are no obvious genotype-phenotype correlations, and inference of the underlying basis from the clinical or biochemical presentation is difficult, if not impossible. However, the majority of cases are caused by mutations in nuclear-encoded genes. It causes a wide range of clinical disorders, ranging from lethal neonatal disease to adult-onset neurodegenerative disorders. Phenotypes include macrocephaly with progressive leukodystrophy, nonspecific encephalopathy, hypertrophic cardiomyopathy, myopathy, liver disease, Leigh syndrome, Leber hereditary optic neuropathy, and some forms of Parkinson disease.

In NDUFS6 mutations the presentation is typically a neonatal lactic acidosis that is swiftly fatal, coupled with multi-system failure.

== See also ==
- NDUFS1
