= PIGS (gene) =

Protein-coding gene in the species Homo sapiens

Identifiers
- Aliases: PIGS, phosphatidylinositol glycan anchor biosynthesis class S, GPIBD18, DEE95
- External IDs: OMIM: 610271; MGI: 2687325; HomoloGene: 41963; GeneCards: PIGS; OMA:PIGS - orthologs

Gene location (Human)
Chr.	Chromosome 17 (human)
Band	17q11.2	Start	28,553,383 bp
Band	17q11.2	End	28,571,794 bp

Gene location (Mouse)
Chr.	Chromosome 11 (mouse)
Band	11|11 B5	Start	78,219,241 bp
Band	11|11 B5	End	78,233,608 bp
RNA expression pattern
Bgee	Human / Mouse (ortholog); Top expressed in: stromal cell of endometrium; granulocyte; islet of Langerhans; mucosa of transverse colon; rectum; duodenum; monocyte; left ventricle; right hemisphere of cerebellum; blood / Top expressed in: choroid plexus of fourth ventricle; spermatocyte; entorhinal cortex; perirhinal cortex; stroma of bone marrow; lens; muscle of thigh; granulocyte; lactiferous gland; genital tubercle; More reference expression data
BioGPS	n/a
Gene ontology
Molecular function	protein binding; GPI-anchor transamidase activity
Cellular component	integral component of membrane; GPI-anchor transamidase complex; endoplasmic reticulum membrane; membrane; endoplasmic reticulum
Biological process	attachment of GPI anchor to protein; GPI anchor biosynthetic process
Sources:Amigo / QuickGO
Orthologs
Species	Human	Mouse
Entrez	94005	276846
Ensembl	ENSG00000087111	ENSMUSG00000041958
UniProt	Q96S52	Q6PD26
RefSeq (mRNA)	NM_033198	NM_201406
RefSeq (protein)	NP_149975	NP_958808
Location (UCSC)	Chr 17: 28.55 – 28.57 Mb	Chr 11: 78.22 – 78.23 Mb
PubMed search
- Wikidata
View/Edit Human	View/Edit Mouse

GPI transamidase component PIG-S is an enzyme that in humans is encoded by the PIGS gene. This gene encodes a protein that is involved in GPI-anchor biosynthesis.

The glycosylphosphatidylinositol (GPI) anchor is a glycolipid found on many blood cells and serves to anchor proteins to the cell surface. This gene encodes an essential component of the multisubunit enzyme, GPI transamidase. GPI transamidase mediates GPI anchoring in the endoplasmic reticulum, by catalyzing the transfer of fully assembled GPI units to proteins.
