= UQCC2 =

Protein-coding gene in the species Homo sapiens

Identifiers
- Aliases: UQCC2, C6orf125, Cbp6, M19, MNF1, bA6B20.2, ubiquinol-cytochrome c reductase complex assembly factor 2, C6orf126, MC3DN7
- External IDs: OMIM: 614461; MGI: 1914517; GeneCards: UQCC2

Gene location (Human)
Chr.	Chromosome 6 (human)
Band	6p21.31	Start	33,694,293 bp
Band	6p21.31	End	33,711,727 bp

Gene location (Mouse)
Chr.	Chromosome 17 (mouse)
Band	17|17 A3.3	Start	27,341,637 bp
Band	17|17 A3.3	End	27,352,890 bp
RNA expression pattern
Bgee	Human / Mouse (ortholog); Top expressed in: apex of heart; right auricle of heart; left ventricle; right testis; left testis; myocardium of left ventricle; gastrocnemius muscle; muscle of thigh; anterior pituitary; islet of Langerhans / Top expressed in: spermatid; spermatocyte; muscle of thigh; lip; dentate gyrus of hippocampal formation granule cell; superior frontal gyrus; yolk sac; interventricular septum; primary visual cortex; ventricular zone; More reference expression data
BioGPS	n/a
Gene ontology
Molecular function	protein binding
Cellular component	mitochondrial inner membrane; mitochondrial matrix; mitochondrial intermembrane space; mitochondrial nucleoid; membrane; mitochondrion; nuclear body
Biological process	regulation of oxidative phosphorylation; regulation of skeletal muscle cell differentiation; regulation of insulin secretion; positive regulation of mitochondrial translation; mitochondrial respiratory chain complex III assembly
Sources:Amigo / QuickGO
Orthologs
Databases	NCBI: entry; OMA: entry
Species	Human	Mouse
Entrez	84300	67267
Ensembl	ENSG00000137288	ENSMUSG00000024208
UniProt	Q9BRT2	Q9CQY6
RefSeq (mRNA)	NM_032340	NM_026063; NM_001364944
RefSeq (protein)	NP_115716	NP_080339; NP_001351873
Location (UCSC)	Chr 6: 33.69 – 33.71 Mb	Chr 17: 27.34 – 27.35 Mb
PubMed search
- Wikidata
View/Edit Human	View/Edit Mouse

Ubiquinol-cytochrome c reductase complex assembly factor 2 is a protein that in humans is encoded by the UQCC2 gene. Located in the mitochondrial nucleoid, this protein is a complex III assembly factor, playing a role in cytochrome b biogenesis along with the UQCC1 protein. It regulates insulin secretion and mitochondrial ATP production and oxygen consumption. In the sole recorded case, a mutation in the UQCC2 gene caused Complex III deficiency, characterized by intrauterine growth retardation, neonatal lactic acidosis, and renal tubular dysfunction.

== Structure ==
The UQCC2 gene is located on the p arm of chromosome 6 in position 21.31 and spans 14,990 base pairs. The gene produces a 14.9 kDa protein composed of 126 amino acids. This protein has no homologous domains with other known proteins. It is associated with the mitochondrial nucleoid, likely located in the peripheral region. This protein's distribution pattern is similar to other components of the mitochondrial nucleoid, like mtSSB and PHB1/PHB2.

== Function ==
This gene encodes a nucleoid protein localized to the mitochondrial inner membrane and sublocalized to the mitochondrial matrix. The encoded protein permissively regulates insulin secretion in pancreatic beta cells, positively regulates mitochondrial ATP production and oxygen consumption, and is involved in late skeletal muscle differentiation through modulation of mitochondrial respiratory chain activity. This protein is required for the assembly of the Complex III. Expression of this protein is decreased in cells with low mtDNA.

== Clinical Significance ==
In the sole recorded case, a homozygous mutation in intron 2 of the UQCC2 gene caused a splicing disruption; the patient presented with symptoms of nuclear type 7 Complex III deficiency, including neonatal lactic acidosis, renal tubulopathy, and severe intrauterine growth retardation. Additional clinical features included a dysmorphic facial appearance, delayed psychomotor development, autistic features, aggressive behavior, and mild sensorineural hearing loss. Additionally, the patient had decreased levels of UQCC1.

== Interactions ==
This protein interacts with UQCC1.
