= MT-TK =

Transfer RNA

mitochondrially encoded tRNA lysine

Identifiers
- Symbol: MT-TK
- Alt. symbols: MERRF, MTTK
- NCBI gene: 4566
- HGNC: 7489
- RefSeq: NC_001807

Other data
- Locus: Chr. MT

Mitochondrially encoded tRNA lysine also known as MT-TK is a transfer RNA which in humans is encoded by the mitochondrial MT-TK gene.

== Structure ==
The MT-TK gene is located on the p arm of the mitochondrial DNA at position 12 and it spans 70 base pairs. The structure of a tRNA molecule is a distinctive folded structure which contains three hairpin loops and resembles a three-leafed clover.

== Function ==
MT-TK is a small 70 nucleotide RNA (human mitochondrial map position 8295-8364) that transfers the amino acid lysine to a growing polypeptide chain at the ribosome site of protein synthesis during translation.

== Clinical significance ==
Mutations in MT-TK can result in multiple mitochondrial deficiencies and associated disorders.

=== Myoclonic epilepsy with ragged-red fibers (MERRF) ===
Mutations in the MT-TK gene are associated with myoclonic epilepsy and ragged-red fiber disease (MERRF). Myoclonic epilepsy with ragged-red fibers (MERRF) is a disorder that affects many parts of the body, particularly the muscles and nervous system. In most cases, the signs and symptoms of this disorder appear during childhood or adolescence. The features of MERRF vary widely among affected individuals, even among members of the same family. Common symptoms include, myoclonus, myopathy, spasticity, epilepsy, peripheral neuropathy, dementia, ataxia, atrophy and more. A majority of mutations in the MT-TK gene found to cause the disease were single nucleotide substitutions, such as 8344A>G. The 8344A>G mutation has been found to disable the normal functions of the mitochondria. A family of mutations 8344A>G and 16182A>C in the MT-TK gene has been found with MERRF syndrome. Another family with the syndrome exhibited mutations of 3243A>G and 16428G>A.

=== MERRF/MELAS overlap syndrome ===
MELAS syndrome may also be accompanied by another mitochondrial disorder called myoclonic epilepsy with ragged-red fibers, also known as MERRF syndrome. In addition to symptoms of MELAS syndrome, additional signs and symptoms may include muscle twitches (myoclonus), difficulty coordinating movement (ataxia), and abnormal muscle cells known as ragged-red fibers. The combination of MERRF and MELAS is called the MERRF/MELAS overlap syndrome. It has not been determined how mutations alter the energy production function of the mitochondria and result in symptoms of such syndromes. The single nucleotide substitution 8356T>C has been found to cause the syndrome.

=== Maternally inherited diabetes and deafness (MIDD) ===
A mutation in the MT-TK gene has been found in a small number of people with maternally inherited diabetes and deafness (MIDD). The disorder is characterized by diabetes combined with hearing loss, particularly of high pitches. Additional symptoms includemuscle weakness (myopathy) and various problems with a patient's eyes, heart, or kidneys. Mutations in the MT-TK gene disables the insulin release by the mitochondria. Diabetes results when the beta cells do not release enough insulin to regulate blood sugar effectively. Researchers have not determined how mutations lead to hearing loss or the other features of MIDD. The single nucleotide substitution 8296A>G has been found to cause the syndrome.

=== Leigh syndrome ===
The 8344A>G mutation in the MT-TK gene may also result in Leigh syndrome, a progressive brain disorder. Clinical manifestations, which include vomiting, seizures, delayed development, myopathy, and problems with movement, have an early onset of infancy or early childhood. Additional symptoms include heart problems, kidney problems, and breathing difficulties. The cause of the disease has not been identified.

=== Cardiomyopathy ===
The 8363G>A mutation in the MT-TK gene may also cause hypertrophic cardiomyopathy, a disorder characterized by the thickening of the heart, and hearing loss. Additional symptoms may include myopathy and ataxia. A family with abundant 8363G>A mutations of MT-TK in their muscle samples exhibited symptoms of encephalomyopathy, sensorineural hearing loss, and hypertrophic cardiomyopathy.

=== Complex IV Deficiency ===
MT-TK mutations have been associated with complex IV deficiency of the mitochondrial respiratory chain, also known as the cytochrome c oxidase deficiency. Cytochrome c oxidase deficiency is a rare genetic condition that can affect multiple parts of the body, including skeletal muscles, the heart, the brain, or the liver. Common clinical manifestations include myopathy, hypotonia, and encephalomyopathy, lactic acidosis, and hypertrophic cardiomyopathy. A patient with a 8313G>A mutation in the MT-TK gene exhibited symptoms of the deficiency accompanied by bilateral ptosis. Other variants also include 8328G>A and 8344G>A.
