= MT-TS1 =

Transfer RNA

mitochondrially encoded tRNA serine 1 (UCN)

Identifiers
- Symbol: MT-TS1
- Alt. symbols: MTTS1
- NCBI gene: 4574
- HGNC: 7497
- RefSeq: NC_001807

Other data
- Locus: Chr. MT

Mitochondrially encoded tRNA serine 1 (UCN) also known as MT-TS1 is a transfer RNA which in humans is encoded by the mitochondrial MT-TS1 gene.

MT-TS1 is a small 69 nucleotide RNA (human mitochondrial map position 7446-7514) that transfers the amino acid serine to a growing polypeptide chain at the ribosome site of protein synthesis during translation.
