= Gömöri trichrome stain =

Histological stain used on muscle tissue

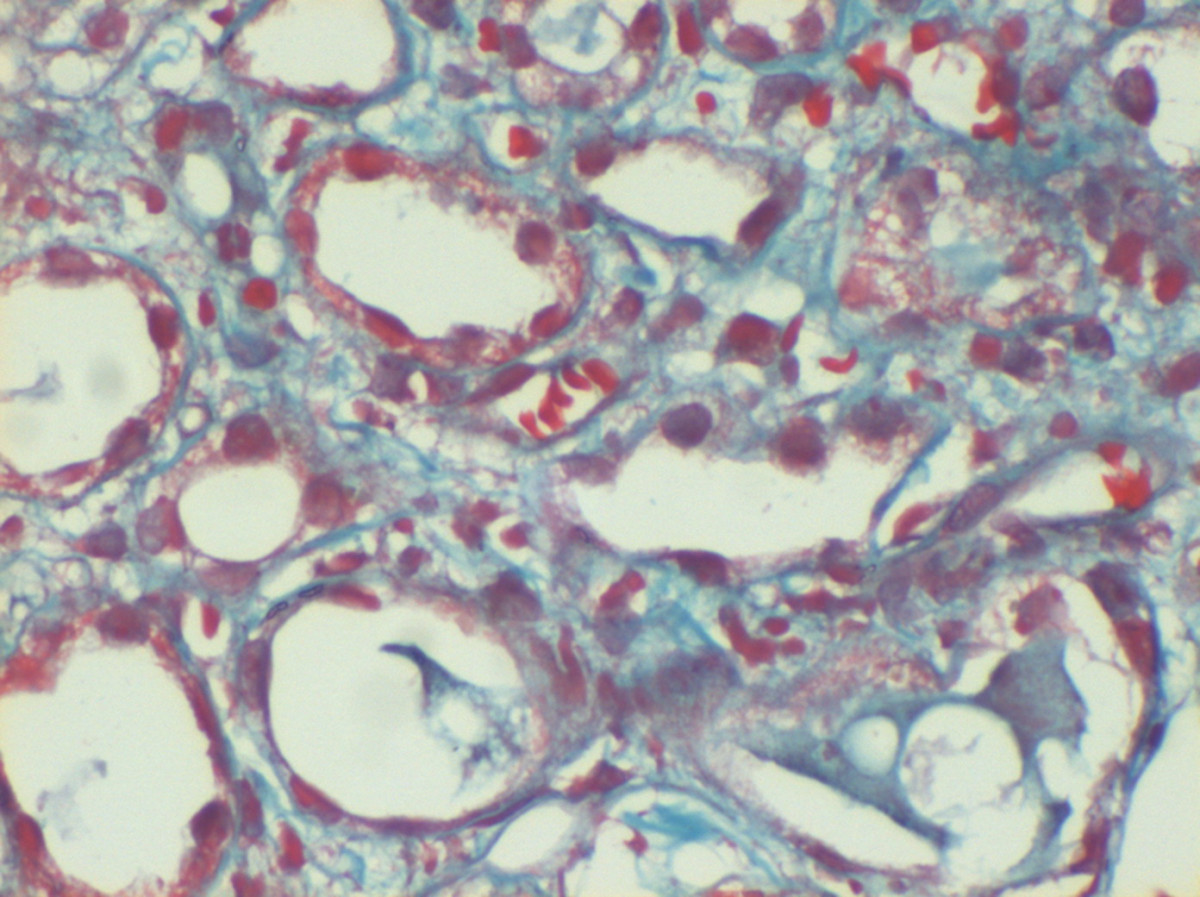
Dilated peri-tubular capillaries filled with sickled RBCs, original Gomori's trichrome stain, × 400.

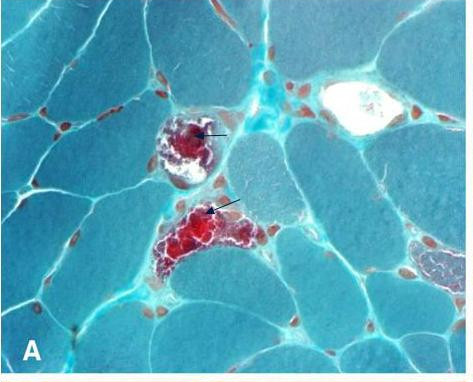
The "ragged red fibers" in MELAS syndrome are visible under modified Gomori stain.

Gömöri trichrome stain is a histological stain used on muscle tissue.

It can be used to test for certain forms of mitochondrial myopathy.

It is named for George Gömöri, who developed it in 1950.
