= MT-TS2 =

Transfer RNA

mitochondrially encoded tRNA serine 2 (AGU/C)

Identifiers
- Symbol: MT-TS2
- Alt. symbols: MTTS2
- NCBI gene: 4575
- HGNC: 7498
- RefSeq: NC_001807

Other data
- Locus: Chr. MT

Mitochondrially encoded tRNA serine 2 (AGU/C) also known as MT-TS2 is a transfer RNA which in humans is encoded by the mitochondrial MT-TS2 gene.

MT-TS2 is a small 59 nucleotide RNA (human mitochondrial map position 12207-12265) that transfers the amino acid serine to a growing polypeptide chain at the ribosome site of protein synthesis during translation.
