= NDUFS2 =

Protein found in humans

Identifiers
- Aliases: NDUFS2, CI-49, NADH:ubiquinone oxidoreductase core subunit S2, MC1DN6
- External IDs: OMIM: 602985; MGI: 2385112; GeneCards: NDUFS2
Enzyme activity
EC #	BRENDA	ExPASy	KEGG	MetaCyc
7.1.1.2	↗	↗	↗	↗

Gene location (Human)
Chr.	Chromosome 1 (human)
Band	1q23.3	Start	161,197,104 bp
Band	1q23.3	End	161,214,395 bp

Gene location (Mouse)
Chr.	Chromosome 1 (mouse)
Band	1|1 H3	Start	171,062,422 bp
Band	1|1 H3	End	171,078,957 bp
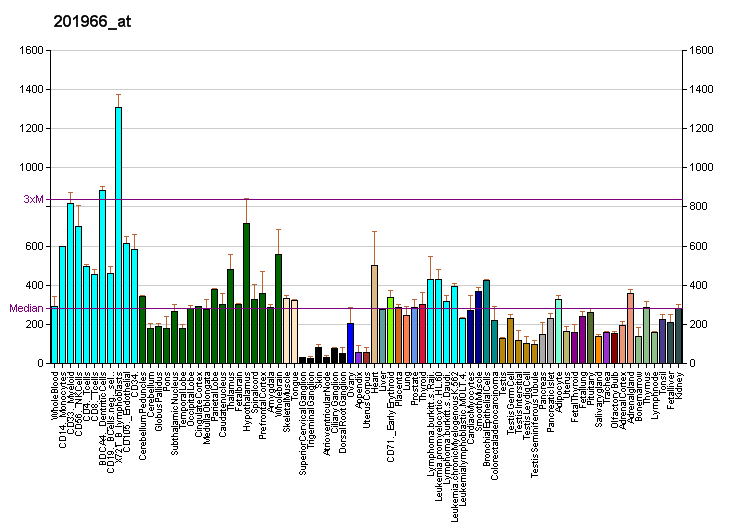
RNA expression pattern
Bgee	Human / Mouse (ortholog); Top expressed in: apex of heart; gastrocnemius muscle; left ventricle; mucosa of transverse colon; right adrenal gland; right adrenal cortex; right ventricle; right auricle of heart; myocardium of left ventricle; muscle of thigh / Top expressed in: cardiac muscle tissue of left ventricle; extensor digitorum longus muscle; interventricular septum; extraocular muscle; plantaris muscle; thoracic diaphragm; soleus muscle; digastric muscle; tibialis anterior muscle; temporal muscle; More reference expression data
BioGPS	More reference expression data
Gene ontology
Molecular function	oxidoreductase activity, acting on NAD(P)H; 4 iron, 4 sulfur cluster binding; quinone binding; NADH dehydrogenase (ubiquinone) activity; iron-sulfur cluster binding; NAD binding; metal ion binding; protein binding; electron transfer activity; oxidoreductase activity; ubiquitin protein ligase binding; NADH dehydrogenase activity
Cellular component	membrane; mitochondrial respiratory chain complex I; nucleoplasm; mitochondrial matrix; mitochondrion; mitochondrial inner membrane; respirasome
Biological process	response to oxidative stress; mitochondrial respiratory chain complex I assembly; mitochondrial electron transport, NADH to ubiquinone; mitochondrial ATP synthesis coupled electron transport
Sources:Amigo / QuickGO
Orthologs
Databases	NCBI: entry; OMA: entry
Species	Human	Mouse
Entrez	4720	226646
Ensembl	ENSG00000158864	ENSMUSG00000013593
UniProt	O75306	Q91WD5
RefSeq (mRNA)	NM_001166159; NM_004550	NM_153064
RefSeq (protein)	NP_001159631; NP_004541; NP_001364227; NP_001364228; NP_001364229 NP_001364230; NP_001364231	NP_694704
Location (UCSC)	Chr 1: 161.2 – 161.21 Mb	Chr 1: 171.06 – 171.08 Mb
PubMed search
- Wikidata
View/Edit Human	View/Edit Mouse

NADH dehydrogenase [ubiquinone] iron-sulfur protein 2, mitochondrial (NDUFS2) also known as NADH-ubiquinone oxidoreductase 49 kDa subunit is an enzyme that in humans is encoded by the NDUFS2 gene. The protein encoded by this gene is a core subunit of the mitochondrial membrane respiratory chain NADH dehydrogenase (complex I). Mutations in this gene are associated with mitochondrial complex I deficiency.

== Structure ==
NDUFS2 is located on the q arm of chromosome 1 in position 23.3 and has 15 exons. The NDUFS2 gene produces a 52.5 kDa protein composed of 463 amino acids. NDUFS2, the protein encoded by this gene, is a member of the complex I 49 kDa subunit family. It is a peripheral membrane protein on the matrix side of the inner mitochondrial membrane. It contains a cofactor binding site for a [4Fe-4S] cluster, a transit peptide, 5 turns, 11 beta strands, and 18 alpha helixes. Alternatively spliced transcript variants encoding different isoforms have been found for this gene.

== Function ==
Mitochondrial complex I is the first multimeric complex of the respiratory chain that catalyzes the NADH oxidation with concomitant ubiquinone reduction and proton ejection out of the mitochondria. Mammalian mitochondrial complex I is an assembly of at least 43 different subunits. Seven of the subunits are encoded by the mitochondrial genome; the remainder are the products of nuclear genes. The iron-sulfur protein (IP) fraction of complex I is made up of 7 subunits, including NDUFS2. Dimethylation at Arg-118 by NDUFAF7 takes place after NDUFS2 assembles into the complex I, leading to the stabilization of the early intermediate complex.

== Clinical significance ==
Mutations in the NDUFS2 gene are associated with Mitochondrial Complex I Deficiency, which is autosomal recessive. This deficiency is the most common enzymatic defect of the oxidative phosphorylation disorders. Mitochondrial complex I deficiency shows extreme genetic heterogeneity and can be caused by mutation in nuclear-encoded genes or in mitochondrial-encoded genes. There are no obvious genotype–phenotype correlations, and inference of the underlying basis from the clinical or biochemical presentation is difficult, if not impossible. However, the majority of cases are caused by mutations in nuclear-encoded genes. It causes a wide range of clinical disorders, ranging from lethal neonatal disease to adult-onset neurodegenerative disorders. Phenotypes include macrocephaly with progressive leukodystrophy, nonspecific encephalopathy, hypertrophic cardiomyopathy, myopathy, liver disease, Leigh syndrome, Leber hereditary optic neuropathy, and some forms of Parkinson disease.

== Interactions ==
NDUFS2 has been shown to have 121 binary protein-protein interactions including 112 co-complex interactions. NDUFS2 appears to interact with NDUFS3, MKLN1, EGR2, HMOX2, CENPU, and TNFRSF14.

== See also ==
- NDUFS1
