= Supercomplex =

Supramolecular structures in mitochondria

I/III/IV Supercomplex. Complex I in yellow, Complex III in green, and Complex IV in purple. A, B, and E are side views of the complexes as they are oriented upright in the membrane. Horizontal lines on E indicate the position of the membrane. D is a view from the intermembrane space. C and F are viewed from inside the matrix.

Modern biological research has revealed strong evidence that the enzymes of the mitochondrial respiratory chain assemble into larger, supramolecular structures called supercomplexes, instead of the traditional fluid model of discrete enzymes dispersed in the inner mitochondrial membrane. These supercomplexes are functionally active and necessary for forming stable respiratory complexes.

One supercomplex of complex I, III, and IV make up a unit known as a respirasome. Respirasomes have been found in a variety of species and tissues, including rat brain, liver, kidney, skeletal muscle, heart, bovine heart, human skin fibroblasts, fungi, plants, and C. elegans.

== History ==
In 1955, biologists Britton Chance and G. R. Williams were the first to propose the idea that respiratory enzymes assemble into larger complexes, although the fluid state model remained the standard. However, as early as 1985, researchers had begun isolating complex III/complex IV supercomplexes from bacteria and yeast. Finally, in 2000 Hermann Schägger and Kathy Pfeiffer used Blue Native PAGE to isolate bovine mitochondrial membrane proteins, showing Complex I, III, and IV arranged in supercomplexes.

== Composition and formation ==
The most common supercomplexes observed are Complex I/III, Complex I/III/IV, and Complex III/IV. Most of Complex II is found in a free-floating form in both plant and animal mitochondria. Complex V can be found co-migrating as a dimer with other supercomplexes, but scarcely as part of the supercomplex unit.

Supercomplex assembly appears to be dynamic and respiratory enzymes are able to alternate between participating in large respirasomes and existing in a free state. It is not known what triggers changes in complex assembly, but research has revealed that the formation of supercomplexes is heavily dependent upon the lipid composition of the mitochondrial membrane, and in particular requires the presence of cardiolipin, a unique mitochondrial lipid. In yeast mitochondria lacking cardiolipin, the number of enzymes forming respiratory supercomplexes was significantly reduced. According to Wenz et al. (2009), cardiolipin stabilizes the supercomplex formation by neutralizing the charges of lysine residues in the interaction domain of Complex III with Complex IV. In 2012, Bazan et al. was able to reconstitute trimer and tetramer Complex III/IV supercomplexes from purified complexes isolated from Saccharomyces cerevisiae and exogenous cardiolipin liposomes.

Another hypothesis for respirasome formation is that membrane potential may initiate changes in the electrostatic/hydrophobic interactions mediating the assembly/disassembly of supercomplexes.

== Functional significance ==
The functional significance of respirasomes is not entirely clear but more recent research is beginning to shed some light on their purpose. It has been hypothesized that the organization of respiratory enzymes into supercomplexes reduces oxidative damage and increases metabolism efficiency. Schäfer et al. (2006) demonstrated that supercomplexes comprising Complex IV had higher activities in Complex I and III, indicating that the presence of Complex IV modifies the conformation of the other complexes to enhance catalytic activity. Evidence has also been accumulated to show that the presence of respirasomes is necessary for the stability and function of Complex I. In 2013, Lapuente-Brun et al. demonstrated that supercomplex assembly is "dynamic and organizes electron flux to optimize the use of available substrates."
