= NDUFA11 =

Protein and coding gene in humans

Identifiers
- Aliases: NDUFA11, B14.7, CI-B14.7, NADH:ubiquinone oxidoreductase subunit A11, MC1DN14
- External IDs: OMIM: 612638; MGI: 3645174; GeneCards: NDUFA11

Gene location (Human)
Chr.	Chromosome 19 (human)
Band	19p13.3	Start	5,891,276 bp
Band	19p13.3	End	5,904,006 bp
RNA expression pattern
Bgee	Human / Mouse (ortholog); Top expressed in: pancreatic ductal cell; cardiac muscle tissue of right atrium; myocardium of left ventricle; right auricle of heart; apex of heart; left adrenal cortex; skin of arm; right adrenal gland; right adrenal cortex; mucosa of ileum / n/a; More reference expression data
BioGPS	n/a
Orthologs
Databases	NCBI: entry; OMA: entry
Species	Human	Mouse
Entrez	126328	239760
Ensembl	ENSG00000174886	n/a
UniProt	Q86Y39	n/a
RefSeq (mRNA)	NM_001193375; NM_175614	n/a
RefSeq (protein)	NP_001180304; NP_783313	n/a
Location (UCSC)	Chr 19: 5.89 – 5.9 Mb	n/a
PubMed search
- Wikidata
View/Edit Human	View/Edit Mouse

NADH dehydrogenase [ubiquinone] 1 alpha subcomplex subunit 11 is an enzyme that in humans is encoded by the NDUFA11 gene. The NDUFA11 protein is a subunit of NADH dehydrogenase (ubiquinone), which is located in the mitochondrial inner membrane and is the largest of the five complexes of the electron transport chain Mutations in subunits of NADH dehydrogenase (ubiquinone), also known as Complex I, frequently lead to complex neurodegenerative diseases such as Leigh's syndrome. Mutations in this gene are associated with severe mitochondrial complex I deficiency.

== Structure ==
The NDUFA11 gene is located on the p arm of chromosome 19 in position 13.3 and spans 12,738 base pairs. The gene produces a 15 kDa protein composed of 141 amino acids. NDUFA11 is a subunit of the enzyme NADH dehydrogenase (ubiquinone), the largest of the respiratory complexes. The structure is L-shaped with a long, hydrophobic transmembrane domain and a hydrophilic domain for the peripheral arm that includes all the known redox centers and the NADH binding site. It has been noted that the N-terminal hydrophobic domain has the potential to be folded into an alpha helix spanning the inner mitochondrial membrane with a C-terminal hydrophilic domain interacting with globular subunits of Complex I. The highly conserved two-domain structure suggests that this feature is critical for the protein function and that the hydrophobic domain acts as an anchor for the NADH dehydrogenase (ubiquinone) complex at the inner mitochondrial membrane. NDUFA11 is one of about 31 hydrophobic subunits that form the transmembrane region of Complex I, but it is an accessory subunit that is believed not to be involved in catalysis. The predicted secondary structure is primarily alpha helix, but the carboxy-terminal half of the protein has high potential to adopt a coiled-coil form. The amino-terminal part contains a putative beta sheet rich in hydrophobic amino acids that may serve as mitochondrial import signal.

== Function ==
The human NDUFA11 gene codes for a subunit of Complex I of the respiratory chain, which transfers electrons from NADH to ubiquinone. NADH binds to Complex I and transfers two electrons to the isoalloxazine ring of the flavin mononucleotide (FMN) prosthetic arm to form FMNH_{2}. The electrons are transferred through a series of iron-sulfur (Fe-S) clusters in the prosthetic arm and finally to coenzyme Q10 (CoQ), which is reduced to ubiquinol (CoQH_{2}). The flow of electrons changes the redox state of the protein, resulting in a conformational change and pK shift of the ionizable side chain, which pumps four hydrogen ions out of the mitochondrial matrix.

== Clinical significance ==
Mutations in NDUFA11 and other Complex I subunit genes result in mitochondrial Complex I deficiency with autosomal recessive inheritance. Patients with these mutations display a wide range of clinical disorders and phenotypes, including lethal neonatal disease, adult-onset neurodegenerative disorders, macrocephaly with progressive leukodystrophy, nonspecific encephalopathy, hypertrophic cardiomyopathy, myopathy, liver disease, Leigh's syndrome, Leber's hereditary optic neuropathy, and some forms of Parkinson's disease. There is no clear genotype-phenotype correlation, but most cases result from mutations in nuclear-encoded genes rather than mitochondrially-encoded genes.
