= NDUFS3 =

Protein-coding gene in the species Homo sapiens

Identifiers
- Aliases: NDUFS3, CI-30, NADH:ubiquinone oxidoreductase core subunit S3, MC1DN8
- External IDs: OMIM: 603846; MGI: 1915599; GeneCards: NDUFS3
Enzyme activity
EC #	BRENDA	ExPASy	KEGG	MetaCyc
7.1.1.2	↗	↗	↗	↗

Gene location (Human)
Chr.	Chromosome 11 (human)
Band	11p11.2	Start	47,565,336 bp
Band	11p11.2	End	47,584,562 bp
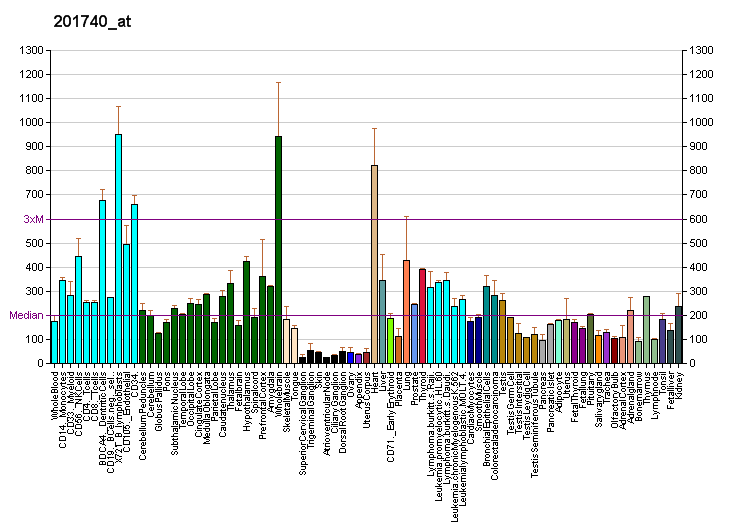
RNA expression pattern
Bgee	Human / Mouse (ortholog); Top expressed in: putamen; mucosa of transverse colon; apex of heart; muscle of thigh; primary visual cortex; caudate nucleus; left ventricle; gastrocnemius muscle; prefrontal cortex; Brodmann area 9 / n/a; More reference expression data
BioGPS	More reference expression data
Gene ontology
Molecular function	oxidoreductase activity, acting on NAD(P)H; protein binding; electron transfer activity; oxidoreductase activity; NADH dehydrogenase activity; NADH dehydrogenase (ubiquinone) activity
Cellular component	membrane; mitochondrial membranes; myelin sheath; mitochondrial respiratory chain complex I; mitochondrial matrix; mitochondrion; mitochondrial inner membrane; respirasome; nuclear body
Biological process	substantia nigra development; negative regulation of intrinsic apoptotic signaling pathway; reactive oxygen species metabolic process; mitochondrial respiratory chain complex I assembly; negative regulation of cell growth; mitochondrial electron transport, NADH to ubiquinone; cellular respiration
Sources:Amigo / QuickGO
Orthologs
Databases	NCBI: entry; OMA: entry
Species	Human	Mouse
Entrez	4722	68349
Ensembl	ENSG00000213619; ENSG00000285387	ENSMUSG00000005510
UniProt	O75489	Q9DCT2
RefSeq (mRNA)	NM_004551	NM_026688
RefSeq (protein)	NP_004542	NP_080964
Location (UCSC)	Chr 11: 47.57 – 47.58 Mb	n/a
PubMed search
- Wikidata
View/Edit Human	View/Edit Mouse

NADH dehydrogenase [ubiquinone] iron-sulfur protein 3, mitochondrial is an enzyme that in humans is encoded by the NDUFS3 gene on chromosome 11. This gene encodes one of the iron-sulfur protein (IP) components of mitochondrial NADH:ubiquinone oxidoreductase (complex I). Mutations in this gene are associated with Leigh syndrome resulting from mitochondrial complex I deficiency.

== Structure ==
The NDUFS3 gene encodes a protein subunit consisting of 263 amino acids. This protein is synthesized in the cytoplasm and then transported to the mitochondria via a signal peptide. Two mutations that occur in its highly conserved C-terminal region, T145I and R199W, are causally linked to Leigh syndrome and optic atrophy. Nonetheless, despite its crucial biological role, the human NDUFS3 remains structurally poorly understood.

== Function ==
This gene encodes one of the iron-sulfur protein (IP) components of complex I. The 45-subunit NADH:ubiquinone oxidoreductase (complex I) is the first enzyme complex in the electron transport chain of mitochondria. As a catalytic subunit, NDUFS3 plays a vital role in the proper assembly of complex I and is recruited to the inner mitochondrial membrane to form an early assembly intermediate with NDUFS2. It initiates the assembly of complex I in the mitochondrial matrix.

Cleavage of NDUFS3 by GzmA has been observed to activate a programmed cell death pathway which results in mitochondrial dysfunction and reactive oxygen species (ROS) generation.

== Clinical significance ==
Mutations in the NDUFS3 gene are associated with Mitochondrial Complex I Deficiency, which is autosomal recessive. This deficiency is the most common enzymatic defect of the oxidative phosphorylation disorders. Mitochondrial complex I deficiency shows extreme genetic heterogeneity and can be caused by mutation in nuclear-encoded genes or in mitochondrial-encoded genes. There are no obvious genotype-phenotype correlations, and inference of the underlying basis from the clinical or biochemical presentation is difficult, if not impossible. However, the majority of cases are caused by mutations in nuclear-encoded genes. It causes a wide range of clinical disorders, ranging from lethal neonatal disease to adult-onset neurodegenerative disorders. Phenotypes include macrocephaly with progressive leukodystrophy, nonspecific encephalopathy, hypertrophic cardiomyopathy, myopathy, liver disease, Leigh syndrome, Leber hereditary optic neuropathy, and some forms of Parkinson disease.

NDUFS3 has also been implicated in breast cancer and ductal carcinoma and, thus, may serve as a novel biomarker for tracking cancer progression and invasiveness.

== See also ==
- NDUFS1
