= NDUFV1 =

Protein-coding gene in the species Homo sapiens

Identifiers
- Aliases: NDUFV1, CI-51K, CI51KD, UQOR1, NADH:ubiquinone oxidoreductase core subunit V1, MC1DN4
- External IDs: OMIM: 161015; MGI: 107851; GeneCards: NDUFV1
Enzyme activity
| EC # | BRENDA | ExPASy | KEGG | MetaCyc |
|---|---|---|---|---|
| 7.1.1.2 | ↗ | ↗ | ↗ | ↗ |

Gene location (Human)
| Chr. | Chromosome 11 (human) |
| Band | 11q13.2 | Start | 67,605,653 bp |
| Band | 11q13.2 | End | 67,612,554 bp |

Gene location (Mouse)
| Chr. | Chromosome 19 (mouse) |
| Band | 19 3.72 cM|19 A | Start | 4,057,384 bp |
| Band | 19 3.72 cM|19 A | End | 4,062,806 bp |
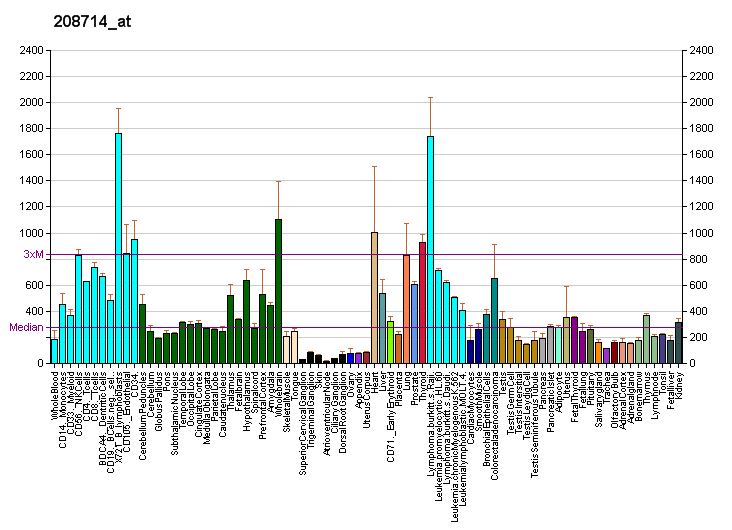
RNA expression pattern
| Bgee | Human / Mouse (ortholog); Top expressed in: apex of heart; right hemisphere of cerebellum; left ventricle; right auricle of heart; mucosa of transverse colon; right uterine tube; right lobe of thyroid gland; gastrocnemius muscle; right frontal lobe; left lobe of thyroid gland / Top expressed in: soleus muscle; right ventricle; myocardium of ventricle; interventricular septum; tibialis anterior muscle; sternocleidomastoid muscle; digastric muscle; ankle; temporal muscle; choroid plexus of fourth ventricle; More reference expression data |
| BioGPS | More reference expression data |
Gene ontology
| Molecular function | oxidoreductase activity, acting on NAD(P)H; NADH dehydrogenase (ubiquinone) activity; oxidoreductase activity; iron-sulfur cluster binding; metal ion binding; NADH dehydrogenase activity; FMN binding; NAD binding; 4 iron, 4 sulfur cluster binding; protein binding |
| Cellular component | mitochondrial inner membrane; mitochondrial respiratory chain complex I; respirasome; membrane; mitochondrion; cytosol |
| Biological process | mitochondrial respiratory chain complex I assembly; mitochondrial electron transport, NADH to ubiquinone; mitochondrial ATP synthesis coupled electron transport; cellular respiration |
Sources:Amigo / QuickGO
Orthologs
| Databases | NCBI: entry; OMA: entry |
| Species | Human | Mouse |
| Entrez | 4723 | 17995 |
| Ensembl | ENSG00000167792 | ENSMUSG00000037916 |
| UniProt | P49821 | Q91YT0 |
| RefSeq (mRNA) | NM_007103; NM_001166102 | NM_133666 |
| RefSeq (protein) | NP_001159574; NP_009034 | NP_598427 |
| Location (UCSC) | Chr 11: 67.61 – 67.61 Mb | Chr 19: 4.06 – 4.06 Mb |
| PubMed search |
- Wikidata
| View/Edit Human | View/Edit Mouse |

NADH dehydrogenase [ubiquinone] flavoprotein 1, mitochondrial (NDUFV1) is an enzyme that in humans is encoded by the NDUFV1 gene. The NDUFV1 gene encodes the 51-kD subunit of complex I (NADH:ubiquinone oxidoreductase) of the mitochondrial respiratory chain. Defects in complex I are a common cause of mitochondrial dysfunction. Mitochondrial complex I deficiency is linked to myopathies, encephalomyopathies, and neurodegenerative disorders such as Parkinson's disease and Leigh syndrome.

== Structure ==
NDUFV1 is located on the q arm of chromosome 11 in position 13.2 and has 10 exons. The NDUFV1 gene produces a 50.8 kDa protein composed of 464 amino acids. NDUFV1, the protein encoded by this gene, is a member of the complex I 51 kDa subunit family. This subunit carries the NADH-binding site as well as flavin mononucleotide (FMN)- and Fe-S-binding sites. It also contains a transit peptide domain and is composed of 6 turns, 14 beta strands, and 19 alpha helixes.

== Function ==
Complex I is composed of 45 different subunits. NDUFV1 is a component of the flavoprotein-sulfur (FP) fragment of the enzyme. NDUFV1 is an oxidoreductase and core subunit of complex I that is thought to be required for assembly and catalysis. It is a peripheral membrane protein located on the matrix side of the mitochondrion inner membrane.

=== Catalytic Activity ===
NADH + ubiquinone + 5 H+(In) = NAD+ + ubiquinol + 4 H+(Out).

NADH + acceptor = NAD+ + reduced acceptor.

== Clinical significance ==
Mutations in the NDUFV1 gene are associated with Mitochondrial Complex I Deficiency, which is autosomal recessive. This deficiency is the most common enzymatic defect of the oxidative phosphorylation disorders. Mitochondrial complex I deficiency shows extreme genetic heterogeneity and can be caused by mutation in nuclear-encoded genes or in mitochondrial-encoded genes. There are no obvious genotype–phenotype correlations, and inference of the underlying basis from the clinical or biochemical presentation is difficult, if not impossible. However, the majority of cases are caused by mutations in nuclear-encoded genes. It causes a wide range of clinical disorders, ranging from lethal neonatal disease to adult-onset neurodegenerative disorders. Phenotypes include macrocephaly with progressive leukodystrophy, nonspecific encephalopathy, hypertrophic cardiomyopathy, myopathy, liver disease, Leigh syndrome, Leber hereditary optic neuropathy, and some forms of Parkinson disease. Clinical manifestations can include lactic acidosis, cerebral degeneration, ophthalmoplegia, ataxia, spasticity, and dystonia resulting from mutations in NDUFV1.

== Interactions ==
NDUFV1 has been shown to have 103 binary protein-protein interactions including 97 co-complex interactions. NDUFV1 appears to interact with EWSR1, CREB1, NCOR1, and VDAC1.
