= NDUFS1 =

Protein-coding gene in the species Homo sapiens

Identifiers
- Aliases: NDUFS1, CI-75Kd, CI-75k, PRO1304, NADH:ubiquinone oxidoreductase core subunit S1, MC1DN5
- External IDs: OMIM: 157655; MGI: 2443241; GeneCards: NDUFS1
Enzyme activity
EC #	BRENDA	ExPASy	KEGG	MetaCyc
7.1.1.2	↗	↗	↗	↗

Gene location (Human)
Chr.	Chromosome 2 (human)
Band	2q33.3	Start	206,114,817 bp
Band	2q33.3	End	206,159,509 bp

Gene location (Mouse)
Chr.	Chromosome 1 (mouse)
Band	1|1 C2	Start	63,182,755 bp
Band	1|1 C2	End	63,215,992 bp
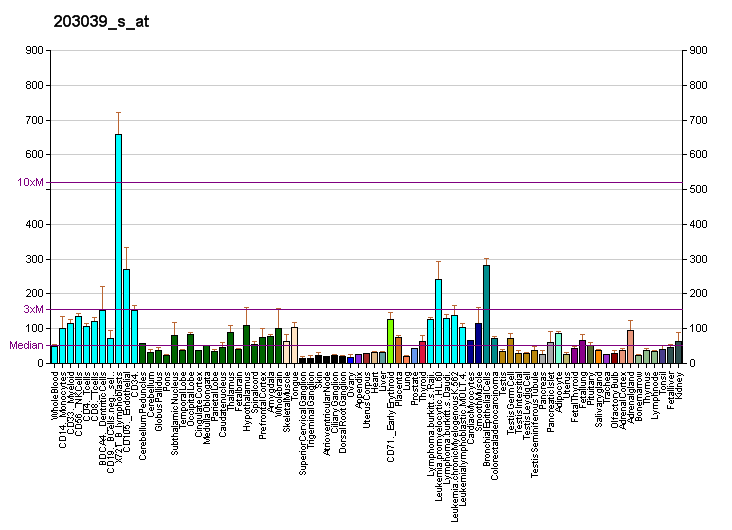
RNA expression pattern
Bgee	Human / Mouse (ortholog); Top expressed in: corpus callosum; skeletal muscle tissue; muscle of leg; gastrocnemius muscle; muscle of thigh; left ventricle; apex of heart; right auricle of heart; islet of Langerhans; rectum / Top expressed in: myocardium of ventricle; cardiac muscles; right ventricle; digastric muscle; extraocular muscle; interventricular septum; cardiac muscle tissue of left ventricle; soleus muscle; temporal muscle; sternocleidomastoid muscle; More reference expression data
BioGPS	More reference expression data
Gene ontology
Molecular function	metal ion binding; NADH dehydrogenase activity; electron transfer activity; oxidoreductase activity; 2 iron, 2 sulfur cluster binding; oxidoreductase activity, acting on NAD(P)H; 4 iron, 4 sulfur cluster binding; protein binding; NADH dehydrogenase (ubiquinone) activity; iron-sulfur cluster binding
Cellular component	respirasome; mitochondrion; mitochondrial matrix; mitochondrial respiratory chain complex I; membrane; mitochondrial intermembrane space; myelin sheath; mitochondrial inner membrane; plasma membrane respiratory chain complex I
Biological process	ATP synthesis coupled electron transport; ATP metabolic process; reactive oxygen species metabolic process; mitochondrial respiratory chain complex I assembly; regulation of mitochondrial membrane potential; apoptotic mitochondrial changes; cellular respiration; mitochondrial electron transport, NADH to ubiquinone
Sources:Amigo / QuickGO
Orthologs
Databases	NCBI: entry; OMA: entry
Species	Human	Mouse
Entrez	4719	227197
Ensembl	ENSG00000023228; ENSG00000283447	ENSMUSG00000025968
UniProt	P28331	Q91VD9
RefSeq (mRNA)	NM_005006; NM_001199981; NM_001199982; NM_001199983; NM_001199984	NM_001160038; NM_001160039; NM_001160040; NM_145518
RefSeq (protein)	NP_001186910; NP_001186911; NP_001186912; NP_001186913; NP_004997	NP_001153510; NP_001153511; NP_001153512; NP_663493
Location (UCSC)	Chr 2: 206.11 – 206.16 Mb	Chr 1: 63.18 – 63.22 Mb
PubMed search
- Wikidata
View/Edit Human	View/Edit Mouse

NADH-ubiquinone oxidoreductase 75 kDa subunit, mitochondrial (NDUFS1) is an enzyme that in humans is encoded by the NDUFS1 gene. The encoded protein, NDUFS1, is the largest subunit of complex I, located on the inner mitochondrial membrane, and is important for mitochondrial oxidative phosphorylation. Mutations in this gene are associated with complex I deficiency.

== Structure ==
NDUFS1 is located on the q arm of chromosome 2 in position 33.3 and has 20 exons. The NDUFS1 gene produces a 79.5 kDa protein composed of 727 amino acids. NDUFS1, the protein encoded by this gene, is a member of the complex I 75 kDa subunit family. It contains a transit peptide, 10 turns, 19 beta strands, 27 alpha helixes, and cofactor binding sites for [2Fe-2S] and [4Fe-4S] clusters. The cluster domains consist of a 79 amino acid 2Fe-2S ferredoxin-type from positions 30–108, a 40 amino acid 4Fe-4S His(Cys)3-ligated-type from positions 108–147, and a 57 amino acid 4Fe-4S Mo/W bis-MGD-type from positions 245–301. Several transcript variants encoding different isoforms have been found for this gene.

== Function ==
The protein encoded by this gene belongs to the complex I 75 kDa subunit family. Mammalian complex I is composed of 45 different subunits. It locates at the mitochondrial inner membrane. This protein has NADH dehydrogenase activity and oxidoreductase activity. It transfers electrons from NADH to the respiratory chain. The immediate electron acceptor for the enzyme is believed to be ubiquinone. This protein is the largest subunit of complex I and it is a component of the iron-sulfur (IP) fragment of the enzyme. It may form part of the active site crevice where NADH is oxidized.

== Clinical significance ==
Mutations in the NDUFS1 gene are associated with Mitochondrial Complex I Deficiency, which is autosomal recessive. This deficiency is the most common enzymatic defect of the oxidative phosphorylation disorders. Mitochondrial complex I deficiency shows extreme genetic heterogeneity and can be caused by mutation in nuclear-encoded genes or in mitochondrial-encoded genes. There are no obvious genotype–phenotype correlations, and inference of the underlying basis from the clinical or biochemical presentation is difficult, if not impossible. However, the majority of cases are caused by mutations in nuclear-encoded genes. It causes a wide range of clinical disorders, ranging from lethal neonatal disease to adult-onset neurodegenerative disorders. Phenotypes include macrocephaly with progressive leukodystrophy, nonspecific encephalopathy, hypertrophic cardiomyopathy, myopathy, liver disease, Leigh syndrome, Leber hereditary optic neuropathy, and some forms of Parkinson disease.

== Interactions ==
NDUFS1 has been shown to have 124 binary protein-protein interactions including 110 co-complex interactions. NDUFS1 appears to interact with SOAT1, NDUFA9, HLA-B, ECE2, C1QTNF9, GPAA1, STOM, GDI1, ACAP2, EHBP1, MBOAT7, PIGS.

== See also ==
- NDUFS2
