= Thiolase =

Enzymes

Thiolase, N-terminal domain

Identifiers
- Symbol: Thiolase_N
- Pfam: PF00108
- InterPro: IPR002155
- PROSITE: PDOC00092
- SCOP2: 1pxt / SCOPe / SUPFAM
- CDD: cd00751
Available protein structures:
- PDB: IPR002155 PF00108 (ECOD; PDBsum)
- AlphaFold: IPR002155; PF00108

Thiolase, C-terminal domain

Identifiers
- Symbol: Thiolase_C
- Pfam: PF02803
- InterPro: IPR002155
- PROSITE: PDOC00092
- SCOP2: 1pxt / SCOPe / SUPFAM
Available protein structures:
- PDB: IPR002155 PF02803 (ECOD; PDBsum)
- AlphaFold: IPR002155; PF02803

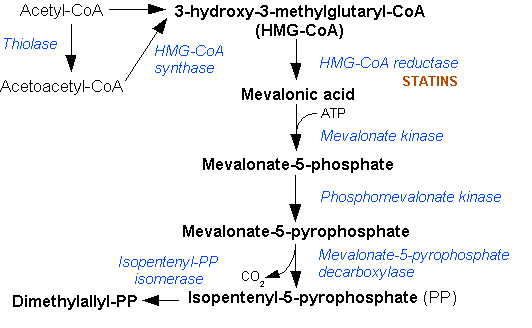
Mevalonate pathway

Thiolases, are most broadly any enzyme that catalyze a reaction between a thiol (structure: R’-SH) and another compound (R-R’) to form a sulfide (R-S-R’) and a hydrogen-bound compound (R’-H). However, in medicine, the term can also refer to a more specific type of enzyme known as acetyl-coenzyme A acetyltransferases (ACAT), which convert two units of acetyl-CoA to acetoacetyl CoA in the mevalonate pathway.

Thiolases are ubiquitous enzymes that have key roles in many vital biochemical pathways, including the beta oxidation pathway of fatty acid degradation and various biosynthetic pathways. Members of the thiolase family can be divided into two broad categories: degradative thiolases (EC 2.3.1.16) and biosynthetic thiolases (EC 2.3.1.9). These two different types of thiolase are found both in eukaryotes and in prokaryotes: acetoacetyl-CoA thiolase (EC:2.3.1.9) and 3-ketoacyl-CoA thiolase (EC:2.3.1.16). 3-ketoacyl-CoA thiolase (also called thiolase I) has a broad chain-length specificity for its substrates and is involved in degradative pathways such as fatty acid beta-oxidation. Acetoacetyl-CoA thiolase (also called thiolase II) is specific for the thiolysis of acetoacetyl-CoA and involved in biosynthetic pathways such as beta-hydroxybutyric acid synthesis or steroid biogenesis.

The formation of a carbon–carbon bond is a key step in the biosynthetic pathways by which fatty acids and polyketide are made. The thiolase superfamily enzymes catalyse the carbon–carbon-bond formation via a thioester-dependent Claisen condensation reaction mechanism.

== Function ==
Thiolases are a family of evolutionarily related enzymes. Two different types of thiolase are found both in eukaryotes and in prokaryotes: acetoacetyl-CoA thiolase (EC 2.3.1.9) and 3-ketoacyl-CoA thiolase (EC 2.3.1.16). 3-ketoacyl-CoA thiolase (also called thiolase I) has a broad chain-length specificity for its substrates and is involved in degradative pathways such as fatty acid beta-oxidation. Acetoacetyl-CoA thiolase (also called thiolase II) is specific for the thiolysis of acetoacetyl-CoA and involved in biosynthetic pathways such as poly beta-hydroxybutyrate synthesis or steroid biogenesis.

In eukaryotes, there are two forms of 3-ketoacyl-CoA thiolase: one located in the mitochondrion and the other in peroxisomes.

There are two conserved cysteine residues important for thiolase activity. The first located in the N-terminal section of the enzymes are involved in the formation of an acyl-enzyme intermediate; the second located at the C-terminal extremity is the active site base involved in deprotonation in the condensation reaction.

== Isozymes ==
EC number	Name	Alternate name	Isozymes	Subcellular distribution
EC 2.3.1.9	Acetyl-CoA C-acetyltransferase	thiolase II; Acetoacetyl-CoA thiolase	ACAT1	mitochondrial
EC 2.3.1.9	Acetyl-CoA C-acetyltransferase	thiolase II; Acetoacetyl-CoA thiolase	ACAT2	cytosolic
EC 2.3.1.16	Acetyl-CoA C-acyltransferase	thiolase I; 3-Ketoacyl-CoA thiolase; β-Ketothiolase; 3-KAT	ACAA1	peroxisomal
EC 2.3.1.16	Acetyl-CoA C-acyltransferase	thiolase I; 3-Ketoacyl-CoA thiolase; β-Ketothiolase; 3-KAT	ACAA2	mitochondrial
EC 2.3.1.16	Acetyl-CoA C-acyltransferase	thiolase I; 3-Ketoacyl-CoA thiolase; β-Ketothiolase; 3-KAT	HADHB	mitochondrial
EC 2.3.1.154	Propionyl-CoA C2-trimethyltridecanoyltransferase	3-Oxopristanoyl-CoA thiolase		
EC 2.3.1.174	3-Oxoadipyl-CoA thiolase	β-Ketoadipyl-CoA thiolase		
EC 2.3.1.176	Propanoyl-CoA C-acyltransferase	Peroxisomal thiolase 2	SCP2	peroxisomal/cytosolic

Mammalian nonspecific lipid-transfer protein (nsL-TP) (also known as sterol carrier protein 2) is a protein which seems to exist in two different forms: a 14 Kd protein (SCP-2) and a larger 58 Kd protein (SCP-x). The former is found in the cytoplasm or the mitochondria and is involved in lipid transport; the latter is found in peroxisomes. The C-terminal part of SCP-x is identical to SCP-2 while the N-terminal portion is evolutionary related to thiolases.

== Mechanism ==
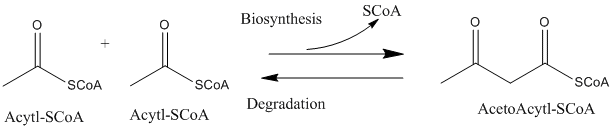
Reaction catalyzed by thiolase

Thioesters are more reactive than oxygen esters and are common intermediates in fatty-acid metabolism. These thioesters are made by conjugating the fatty acid with the free SH group of the pantetheine moiety of either coenzyme A (CoA) or acyl carrier protein (ACP).

All thiolases, whether they are biosynthetic or degradative in vivo, preferentially catalyze the degradation of 3-ketoacyl-CoA to form acetyl-CoA and a shortened acyl-CoA species, but are also capable of catalyzing the reverse Claisen condensation reaction (reflecting the negative Gibbs energy change of the degradation, which is independent of the thiolase catalyzing the reaction). It is well established from studies on the biosynthetic thiolase from Z. ramigera that the thiolase reaction occurs in two steps and follows ping-pong kinetics. In the first step of both the degradative and biosynthetic reactions, the nucleophilic Cys89 (or its equivalent) attacks the acyl-CoA (or 3-ketoacyl-CoA) substrate, leading to the formation of a covalent acyl-enzyme intermediate. In the second step, the addition of CoA (in the degradative reaction) or acetyl-CoA (in the biosynthetic reaction) to the acyl–enzyme intermediate triggers the release of the product from the enzyme. Each of the tetrahedral reaction intermediates that occur during transfer of an acetyl group to and from the nucleophilic cysteine, respectively, have been observed in X-ray crystal structures of biosynthetic thiolase from A. fumigatus.

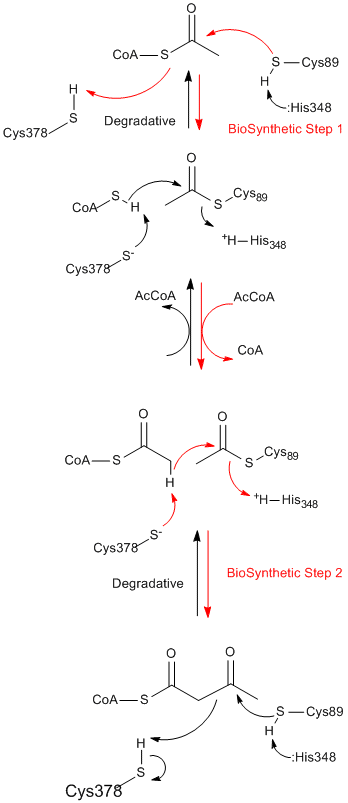
Thiolase Mechanism. The two-step, ping-pong mechanism for the thiolase reaction. Red arrows indicate the biosynthetic reaction; Black arrows trace the degradative reaction. In both directions, the reaction is initiated by the nucleophilic attack of Cys89 on the substrate to form a covalent acetyl–enzyme intermediate. Cys89 is activated for nucleophilic attack by His348, which abstracts the sulfide proton of Cys89. In the second step of both the biosynthetic and degradative reactions, the substrate nucleophilically attacks the acetyl–enzyme intermediate to yield the final product and free enzyme. This nucleophilic attack is activated by Cys378, which abstracts a proton from the substrate.

== Structure ==
Most enzymes of the thiolase superfamily are dimers. However, monomers have not been observed. Tetramers are observed only in the thiolase subfamily and, in these cases, the dimers have dimerized to become tetramers. The crystal structure of the tetrameric biosynthetic thiolase from Zoogloea ramigera has been determined at 2.0 Å resolution. The structure contains a striking and novel ‘cage-like’ tetramerization motif, which allows for some hinge motion of the two tight dimers with respect to each other. The enzyme tetramer is acetylated at Cys89 and has a CoA molecule bound in each of its active-site pockets.

== Biological function ==
In eukaryotic cells, especially in mammalian cells, thiolases exhibit diversity in intracellular localization related to their metabolic functions as well as in substrate specificity. For example, they contribute to fatty-acid β-oxidation in peroxisomes and mitochondria, ketone body metabolism in mitochondria, and the early steps of mevalonate pathway in peroxisomes and cytoplasm. In addition to biochemical investigations, analyses of genetic disorders have made clear the basis of their functions. Genetic studies have identified a three-thiolase system in the yeast Candida tropicalis, which has thiolase activity in peroxisomes, where it may participate in beta oxidation, and in the cytosol, where it participates in the mevalonate pathway. Thiolase is of central importance in key enzymatic pathways such as fatty-acid, steroid and polyketide synthesis. The detailed understanding of its structural biology is of great medical relevance, for example, for a better understanding of the diseases caused by genetic deficiencies of these enzymes and for the development of new antibiotics. Harnessing the complicated catalytic versatility of the polyketide synthases for the synthesis of biologically and medically relevant natural products is also an important future perspective of the studies of the enzymes of this superfamily.

== Disease relevance ==
Mitochondrial acetoacetyl-CoA thiolase deficiency, known earlier as β-ketothiolase deficiency, is an inborn error of metabolism involving isoleucine catabolism and ketone body metabolism. The major clinical manifestations of this disorder are intermittent ketoacidosis but the long-term clinical consequences, apparently benign, are not well documented. Mitochondrial acetoacetyl-CoA thiolase deficiency is easily diagnosed by urinary organic acid analysis and can be confirmed by enzymatic analysis of cultured skin fibroblasts or blood leukocytes.

β-Ketothiolase Deficiency has a variable presentation. Most affected patients present between 5 and 24 months of age with symptoms of severe ketoacidosis. Symptoms can be initiated by a dietary protein load, infection or fever. Symptoms progress from vomiting to dehydration and ketoacidosis. Neutropenia and thrombocytopenia may be present, as can moderate hyperammonemia. Blood glucose is typically normal, but can be low or high in acute episodes. Developmental delay may occur, even before the first acute episode, and bilateral striatal necrosis of the basal ganglia has been seen on brain MRI.
