= TIMMDC1 =

Protein-coding gene in the species Homo sapiens

Identifiers
- Aliases: TIMMDC1, C3orf1, translocase of inner mitochondrial membrane domain containing 1, MC1DN31
- External IDs: OMIM: 615534; MGI: 1922139; GeneCards: TIMMDC1

Gene location (Human)
Chr.	Chromosome 3 (human)
Band	3q13.33	Start	119,498,547 bp
Band	3q13.33	End	119,525,090 bp

Gene location (Mouse)
Chr.	Chromosome 16 (mouse)
Band	16|16 B4	Start	38,318,709 bp
Band	16|16 B4	End	38,343,025 bp
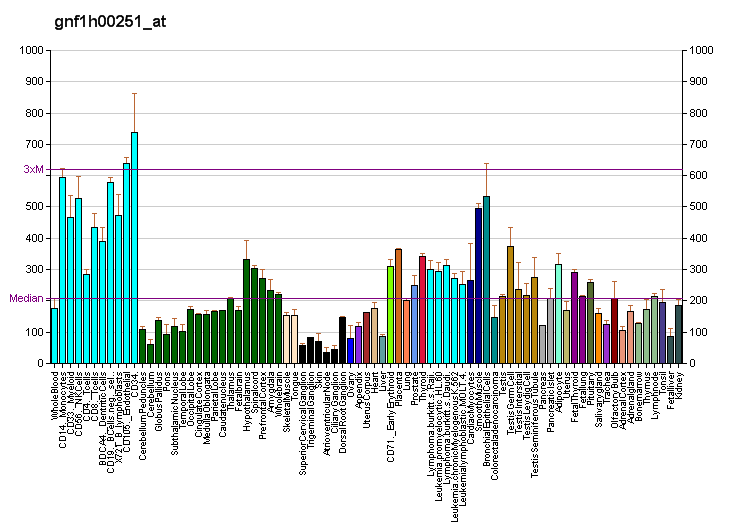
RNA expression pattern
Bgee	Human / Mouse (ortholog); Top expressed in: myocardium of left ventricle; cardiac muscle tissue of right atrium; deltoid muscle; tibialis anterior muscle; quadriceps femoris muscle; vastus lateralis muscle; right ventricle; skin of arm; apex of heart; biceps brachii / Top expressed in: gastrula; muscle of thigh; Gonadal ridge; skeletal muscle tissue; medullary collecting duct; cumulus cell; soleus muscle; myocardium of ventricle; intercostal muscle; renal corpuscle; More reference expression data
BioGPS	More reference expression data
Gene ontology
Molecular function	protein binding
Cellular component	integral component of membrane; mitochondrial inner membrane; membrane; mitochondrion; mitochondrial membranes; nucleoplasm; nucleus
Biological process	mitochondrial respiratory chain complex I assembly
Sources:Amigo / QuickGO
Orthologs
Databases	NCBI: entry; OMA: entry
Species	Human	Mouse
Entrez	51300	76916
Ensembl	ENSG00000113845	ENSMUSG00000002846
UniProt	Q9NPL8	Q8BUY5
RefSeq (mRNA)	NM_016589	NM_024273
RefSeq (protein)	NP_057673	NP_077235
Location (UCSC)	Chr 3: 119.5 – 119.53 Mb	Chr 16: 38.32 – 38.34 Mb
PubMed search
- Wikidata
View/Edit Human	View/Edit Mouse

TIMMDC1 is a protein that in humans is encoded by the TIMMDC1 gene. It is a chaperone protein involved in constructing the membrane arm of mitochondrial Complex I. A frameshift mutation in an intron of this gene has been shown to cause failure to thrive, retardation of psychomotor development, infantile-onset hypotonia, and severe neurologic dysfunction. High expression of this gene has been associated with migration of lung cancer cells while depletion of the protein has been shown to affect regulation of apoptosis, the cell cycle, and cell migration.

== Structure ==
The TIMMDC1 gene is located on the q arm of chromosome 3 in position 13.33 and spans 25,760 base pairs, with 7 exons. The gene produces a 32.2 kDa protein composed of 285 amino acids. The TIMMDC1 protein has 4 transmembrane domains, with the N-terminal and C-terminal extensions localized in the mitochondrial matrix. TIMMDC1 is a multipass mitochondrial inner membrane protein, predicted to be a member of the 4-pass transmembrane protein family of TIM17-TIM22-TIM23. Its topology is predicted to be analogous to TIMM23.

== Function ==
TIMMDC1 is a chaperone protein involved in the assembly of the mitochondrial Complex I (NADH-ubiquinone oxidoreductase), participating in the construction of the membrane arm of complex I.

== Clinical Significance ==
A frameshift mutation in intron 5 of the TIMMDC1 gene has been shown to cause severe neurologic dysfunction, infantile-onset hypotonia, retardation of psychomotor development, and failure to thrive. Additionally, high expression of TIMMDC1 has been associated with metastasis of lung carcinoma cells, with depletion of the protein inhibiting growth and migration of 95D lung carcinoma cells. Depletion of TIMMDC1 has also been shown to alter expression of genes involved in the regulation of apoptosis, cell-cycle arrest, and cell migration, including CCNG2, PTEN, TIMP3, and COL3A1.

== Interactions ==
The TIMMDC1 protein interacts with the intermediate 315 kDa subcomplex of incompletely assembled complex I and has interactions with FATE1, in addition to about 60 other proteins. TIMMDC1 associates reciprocally with multiple components of the ECSIT-TMEM126B-ACAD9-NDUFAF1 assembly factor complex (MCIA complex).
