= ACAD9 =

Protein-coding gene in the species Homo sapiens

Identifiers
- Aliases: ACAD9, NPD002, acyl-CoA dehydrogenase family member 9, MC1DN20
- External IDs: OMIM: 611103; MGI: 1914272; GeneCards: ACAD9
Enzyme activity
EC #	BRENDA	ExPASy	KEGG	MetaCyc
1.3.8.7	↗	↗	↗	↗
1.3.8.8	↗	↗	↗	↗

Gene location (Human)
Chr.	Chromosome 3 (human)
Band	3q21.3	Start	128,879,596 bp
Band	3q21.3	End	128,924,003 bp

Gene location (Mouse)
Chr.	Chromosome 3 (mouse)
Band	3|3 B	Start	36,120,128 bp
Band	3|3 B	End	36,147,002 bp
RNA expression pattern
Bgee	Human / Mouse (ortholog); Top expressed in: skin of arm; skin of abdomen; myocardium of left ventricle; tibialis anterior muscle; cardiac muscle tissue of right atrium; skin of leg; mucosa of ileum; skin of thigh; right adrenal cortex; apex of heart / Top expressed in: right kidney; esophagus; lip; ventricular zone; neural layer of retina; dentate gyrus of hippocampal formation granule cell; muscle of thigh; genital tubercle; tail of embryo; primary visual cortex; More reference expression data
BioGPS	n/a
Gene ontology
Molecular function	oxidoreductase activity, acting on the CH-CH group of donors; oxidoreductase activity; protein binding; acyl-CoA dehydrogenase activity; flavin adenine dinucleotide binding; long-chain-acyl-CoA dehydrogenase activity; medium-chain-acyl-CoA dehydrogenase activity; fatty-acyl-CoA binding; very-long-chain-acyl-CoA dehydrogenase activity
Cellular component	mitochondrial inner membrane; dendrite; mitochondrion; nucleus; mitochondrial membranes
Biological process	mitochondrial respiratory chain complex I assembly; long-chain fatty acid metabolic process; medium-chain fatty acid metabolic process
Sources:Amigo / QuickGO
Orthologs
Databases	NCBI: entry; OMA: entry
Species	Human	Mouse
Entrez	28976	229211
Ensembl	ENSG00000177646	ENSMUSG00000027710
UniProt	Q9H845	Q8JZN5
RefSeq (mRNA)	NM_014049	NM_172678
RefSeq (protein)	NP_054768	NP_766266
Location (UCSC)	Chr 3: 128.88 – 128.92 Mb	Chr 3: 36.12 – 36.15 Mb
PubMed search
- Wikidata
View/Edit Human	View/Edit Mouse

Acyl-CoA dehydrogenase family member 9, mitochondrial is an enzyme that in humans is encoded by the ACAD9 gene. Mitochondrial Complex I Deficiency with varying clinical manifestations has been associated with mutations in ACAD9.

== Structure ==
The ACAD9 gene contains an open reading frame of 1866 base pairs; this gene encodes a protein with 621 amino acid residues. Alignment of the ACAD9 protein sequence with that of other human ACAD proteins showed that ACAD-9 protein displays 46–27% identity, and 56–38% similarity with the eight members of the ACAD family, including ACADVL, ACADS, ACADM, ACADL, IVD, GCD, ACADSB, and ACD8. The calculated molecular weight of the ACAD9 is 68.8 kDa.

== Function ==
The ACAD9 enzyme catalyzes a crucial step in fatty acid beta-oxidation by forming a C2-C3 trans-double bond in the fatty acid. LVCAD is specific to very long-chain fatty acids, typically C16-acylCoA and longer. It has been observed that ACAD9 can catalyze acyl-CoAs with very long chains. The specific activity of ACAD9 towards palmitoyl-CoA (C16:0) is three times higher than that towards stearoyl-CoA (C18:0). ACAD-9 has little activity on n-octanoyl-CoA (C8:0), n-butyryl-CoA (C4:0) or isovaleryl-CoA (C5:0).

In contrast with ACADVL, ACAD9 is also involved in assembly of the oxidative phosphorylation complex I. ACAD9 binds complex I assembly factors NDUFAF1 and Ecsit and is specifically required for the assembly of complex I. Furthermore, ACAD9 mutations result in complex I deficiency and not in disturbed long-chain fatty acid oxidation.

== Clinical significance ==
Mutations in the ACAD9 gene are associated with mitochondrial complex I deficiency type 20, which is autosomal recessive. This deficiency is the most common enzymatic defect of the oxidative phosphorylation disorders. Mitochondrial complex I deficiency shows extreme genetic heterogeneity and can be caused by mutation in nuclear-encoded genes or in mitochondrial-encoded genes. There are no obvious genotype–phenotype correlations, and inference of the underlying basis from the clinical or biochemical presentation is difficult, if not impossible. However, the majority of cases are caused by mutations in nuclear-encoded genes. It causes a wide range of clinical disorders, ranging from lethal neonatal disease to adult-onset neurodegenerative disorders. Phenotypes include macrocephaly with progressive leukodystrophy, nonspecific encephalopathy, hypertrophic cardiomyopathy, myopathy, liver disease, Leigh syndrome, Leber hereditary optic neuropathy, and some forms of Parkinson disease.

A few cases specific to ACAD9 have been reported. Some cases presented with episodic liver dysfunction during otherwise mild illnesses or cardiomyopathy, along with chronic neurologic dysfunction. Brain findings were notable for generalized edema with diffuse ventricular compression, acute left tonsillar herniation, and diffuse multifocal acute damage in the hippocampus. In addition, some abnormalities consistent with nonacute changes were seen, including a subacute right cerebellar hemispheric infarct and reduction in the number of neurons in several areas. In one patient, whose clinical manifestations of hypotonia, cardiomyopathy, and lactic acidosis, a vigorous treatment with riboflavin allowed the individual to have normal psychomotor development and no cognitive impairment at 5 years of age. Exercise-induced rhabdomyolysis, mitochondrial encephalomyopathy, and hyperplasia in liver, cardiac myocytes, skeletal muscle, and renal tubules have also been observed in patients with ACAD9 mutations.

== Interactions ==
ACAD9 is part of the mitochondrial complex I assembly (MCIA) complex. The complex comprises at least TMEM126B, NDUFAF1, ECSIT, and ACAD9, which interacts directly with NDUFAF1 and ECSIT.
