= Sterol carrier protein =

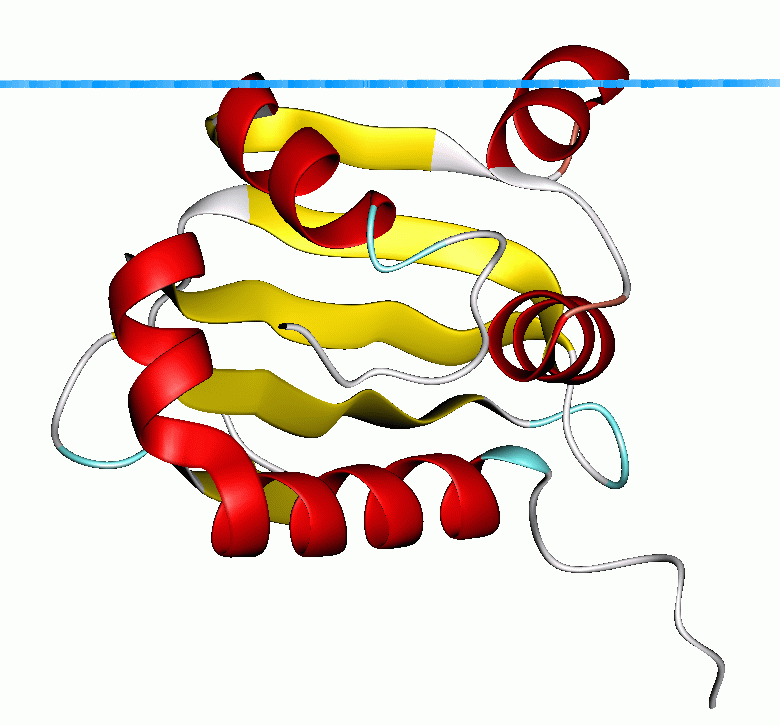
- Sterol carrier protein 2

Identifiers
- Symbol: SCP2
- Pfam: PF02036
- InterPro: IPR003033
- PROSITE: PDOC00092
- SCOP2: 1qnd / SCOPe / SUPFAM
- OPM superfamily: 135
- OPM protein: 2cx7
Available protein structures:
- PDB: IPR003033 PF02036 (ECOD; PDBsum)
- AlphaFold: IPR003033; PF02036

Sterol carrier proteins (also known as nonspecific lipid transfer proteins) is a family of proteins that transfer steroids and probably also phospholipids and gangliosides between cellular membranes.

These proteins are different from plant nonspecific lipid transfer proteins but structurally similar to small proteins of unknown function from Thermus thermophilus.

This domain is involved in binding sterols. The human sterol carrier protein 2 (SCP2) is a basic protein that is believed to participate in the intracellular transport of cholesterol and various other lipids.

== Human proteins containing this domain ==
HSD17B4; HSDL2; SCP2; STOML1;

== See also ==
- Steroidogenic acute regulatory protein and START domain
