= TMEM126B =

Gene of the species Homo sapiens

Identifiers
- Aliases: TMEM126B, HT007, transmembrane protein 126B
- External IDs: OMIM: 615533; MGI: 1915722; HomoloGene: 10222; GeneCards: TMEM126B; OMA:TMEM126B - orthologs
Gene ontology
Molecular function	protein binding; molecular function
Cellular component	integral component of membrane; mitochondrial inner membrane; membrane; mitochondrial membranes; mitochondrion; cellular component
Biological process	mitochondrial respiratory chain complex I assembly; biological process
Sources:Amigo / QuickGO
Orthologs
Species	Human	Mouse
Entrez	55863	68472
Ensembl	ENSG00000171204	n/a
UniProt	Q8IUX1	Q9D1R1
RefSeq (mRNA)	NM_001193537; NM_001193538; NM_001256546; NM_001256547; NM_018480	NM_026734
RefSeq (protein)	NP_001180466; NP_001180467; NP_001243475; NP_001243476; NP_060950 NP_001337322; NP_001337323; NP_001337324; NP_001337325	NP_081010
Location (UCSC)	n/a	n/a
PubMed search
- Wikidata
View/Edit Human	View/Edit Mouse

Transmembrane protein 126B is a protein that in humans is encoded by the TMEM126B gene. TMEM126B is a mitochondrial transmembrane protein which is a component of the mitochondrial complex I assembly complex. The TMEM126B gene is conserved in mammals. The encoded protein serves as an assembly factor that is required for formation of the membrane arm of the complex. It interacts with NADH dehydrogenase [ubiquinone] 1 alpha subcomplex assembly factor 13. Naturally occurring mutations in this gene are associated with isolated complex I deficiency. A pseudogene of this gene has been defined on chromosome 9.

== Structure ==
TMEM126B is located on the q arm of chromosome 11 in position 14.1 and has 7 exons. The TMEM126B gene produces a 4.6 kDa protein composed of 54 amino acids. It is a part of the mitochondrial complex I assembly (MCIA) complex, composed of NDUFAF1, ECSIT, and ACAD9 (by similarity). It associates with the intermediate 370 kDa subcomplex of incompletely assembled complex I. Complex I is composed of 45 evolutionally conserved core subunits, including both mitochondrial DNA and nuclear encoded subunits. One of its arms is embedded in the inner membrane of the mitochondria, and the other is embedded in the organelle. The two arms are arranged in an L-shaped configuration. The total molecular weight of the complex is 1MDa. A cartoon representation of the predicted orientation of TMEM126B within cell membrane, tentatively based on the phosphorylation and hydrophobicity data is shown below.

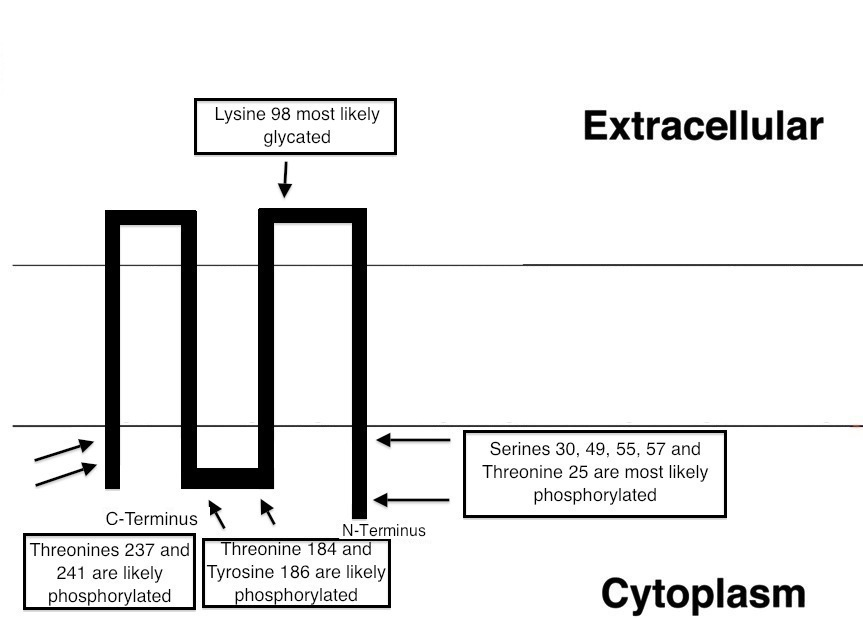

== Function ==
The TMEM126B gene encodes a mitochondrial transmembrane protein which is a component of the mitochondrial complex I assembly complex. The encoded protein serves as an assembly factor that is required for formation of the membrane arm of the complex. TMEM126B comigrates with other assembly factors including ACAD9, CIA30, and ECSIT. In the absence of TMEM126B, such assembly factors were not recruited into the mitochondrial membrane, and did not participate in complex I assembly. Dysfunction of TMEM126B has known to cause several complications in complex I characterized by severe difficulties in mitochondrial respiration and the complete failure of complex I assembly. However, it is not known to have significant effect on the assemblies of mitochondrial complexes III, IV, and V.

== Clinical Significance ==
Mutations in TMEM126B is known to result in mitochondrial diseases and associated disorders. It is majorly associated with a complex I deficiency, a deficiency in the first complex of the mitochondrial respiratory chain. A complex I deficiency involving the dysfunction of the mitochondrial respiratory chain may cause a wide range of clinical manifestations from lethal neonatal disease to adult-onset neurodegenerative disorders. Phenotypes include macrocephaly with progressive leukodystrophy, non-specific encephalopathy, cardiomyopathy, Leigh syndrome, myopathy, liver disease, Leber hereditary optic neuropathy, and some forms of Parkinson disease. In addition to complex I deficiency, TMEM126B mutations also show association with severe multi-system disorders during infancy, such as chronic renal failure and cardiomyopathy, and myopathy in childhood or adulthood.

== Discovery ==
TMEM126B was first discovered in a study of protein expression in tissues of the hypothalamus-pituitary-adrenal axis using full cDNA cloning. It has since been detected in other tissues.

== Gene ==
TMEM126B is located on chromosome 11 in humans, flanked by the following genes:

- DLG2: A member of the membrane-associated guanylate kinase family.
- TMEM126A: A paralog of TMEM126B expressed in the mitochondria.
- CREBZF: Also known as the Zhangfei protein, a protein that interacts with herpes simplex virus.

== Translation ==
A conceptual translation of the TMEM126B protein, including a projection of the secondary structure, predictions of transmembrane regions, and putative phosphorylation and glycation sites is included below:

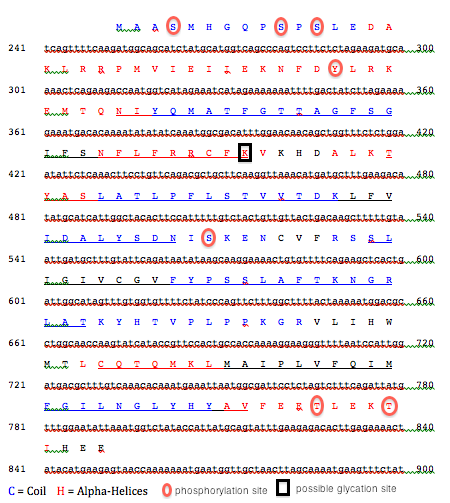

== Tissue distribution ==
TMEM126B is expressed in most tissue types, with the notable exceptions of adipose tissue, ear tissue, the larynx, lymph tissue, nerve tissue, pituitary gland, spleen, thymus, thyroid, trachea, and umbilical cord. It also appears to be highly expressed in parathyroid, bone marrow, and urinary bladder tissue. There is also evidence that one of the isoforms of TMEM126B is expressed in the cell membrane of memory B cells of the adaptive immune system.
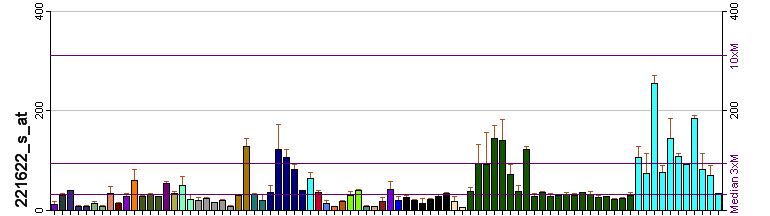

== Predicted properties ==
The following properties of TMEM126B were predicted using bioinformatic analysis:

- Molecular Weight: 22.7 KDal
- Isoelectric point: 9.02
- TMEM126B orthologs have highly variable isoelectric points.
- Post-translational modification: several possible phosphorylation sites were detected, and a pair of possible glycation sites were predicted
- No signal peptide has been predicted.

== Interactions ==
In addition to co-subunits for complex I, TMEM126B has protein-protein interactions with ECSIT, NDUFAF1, NDUFC2, NDUFA13, and others.
