= 2-methylacetoacetyl-CoA thiolase =

2-methylacetoacetyl-CoA thiolase may refer to:

- Acetyl-CoA C-acetyltransferase
- Acetyl-CoA C-acyltransferase
