= PTE-2 =

PTE-2 may refer to one of two enzymes:

- Choloyl-CoA hydrolase
- Propanoyl-CoA C-acyltransferase
