= MTPD =

MTPD may refer to:

- Maximum tolerable period of disruption, the maximum time that key products or services can be unavailable or undeliverable before stakeholders perceive unacceptable consequences
- Metro Transit Police Department, the policing agency of the Washington Metropolitan Area Transit Authority (WMATA)
- Mitochondrial trifunctional protein deficiency, an inherited fatty acid oxidation disorder.
- Metric tonnes per day, a unit for capacity, i.e. of a chemical plant.
- Media Transfer Protocol daemon, a Linux background service responsible for transferring data, typically with Android devices and digital cameras.
