= 2-Methylbutyryl-CoA dehydrogenase deficiency =

- Other names: 2-Methylbutyryl glycinuria or Short/branched-chain acyl-CoA dehydrogenase deficiency (SBCADD),
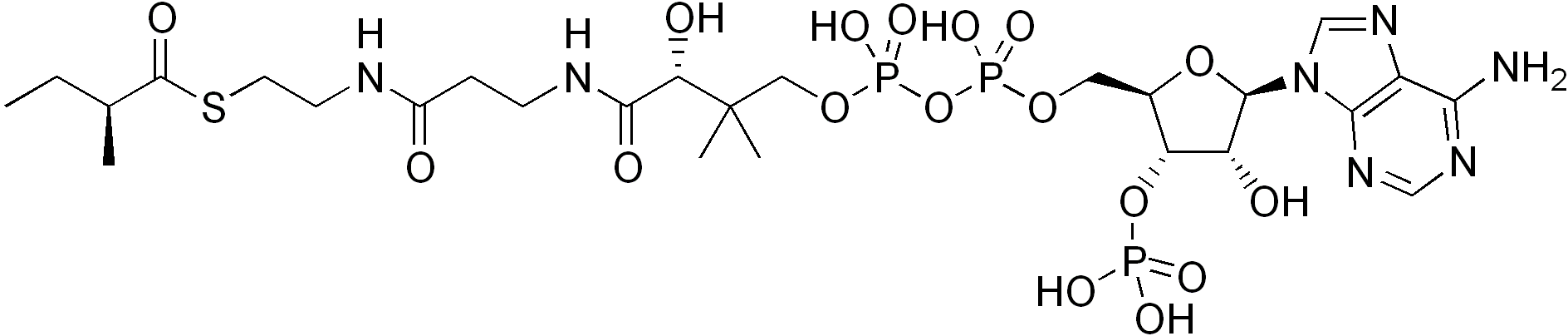
- 2-Methylbutyryl-CoA

2-Methylbutyryl-CoA dehydrogenase deficiency is an autosomal recessive metabolic disorder. It causes the body to be unable to process the amino acid isoleucine properly. Initial case reports identified individuals with developmental delay and epilepsy, however most cases identified through newborn screening have been asymptomatic.

== Signs and symptoms ==
SBCADD is included as a secondary target condition in most newborn screening programs, as the key analyte is the same as is used to identify isovaleric acidemia. Most cases have been Hmong individuals, who are asymptomatic. There are isolated case reports where individuals have been identified with SBCADD in addition to developmental delay and epilepsy. It is currently unclear what the complete clinical presentation of SBCADD looks like. There is some concern that these cases with additional symptoms may reflect an ascertainment bias rather than being a true representation of the clinical spectrum of the disease. Currently, there is no accepted treatment, as most affected individuals do not require any. Some recommend avoidance of valproic acid, as it can be a substrate for 2-methylbutyryl-CoA dehydrogenase.

== Cause ==
2-Methylbutyryl-CoA dehydrogenase deficiency has an autosomal recessive pattern of inheritance.

The disorder is caused by a mutation in the ACADSB gene, located on the long arm of human chromosome 10 (10q25-q26). It is inherited in an autosomal recessive manner, which means an affected individual must inherit one copy of the mutation from each parent.

== Diagnosis ==
Most individuals with SBCADD are identified through newborn screening, where they present with an elevation of a five carbon acylcarnitine species. Confirmatory testing includes plasma and urine analysis to identify the carnitine and glycine conjugates of 2-methylbutyryl-CoA.
