= Organic acidemia =

Group of metabolic disorders

- Other names: Organic aciduria, Organic acid disorder

Organic acidemia is a term used to classify a group of metabolic disorders which disrupt normal amino acid metabolism, particularly branched-chain amino acids, causing a buildup of acids which are usually not present.

The branched-chain amino acids include isoleucine, leucine and valine. Organic acids refer to the amino acids and certain odd-chained fatty acids which are affected by these disorders.

The four main types of organic acidemia are: methylmalonic acidemia, propionic acidemia, isovaleric acidemia, and maple syrup urine disease.

== Cause ==
Most of the organic acidemias result from defective autosomal genes for various enzymes important to amino acid metabolism. Neurological and physiological harm is caused by this impaired ability to synthesize a key enzyme required to break down a specific amino acid, or group of amino acids, resulting in acidemia and toxicity to specific organ systems. Most are inherited as autosomal recessive diseases.

== Diagnosis ==
Organic acidemias are usually diagnosed in infancy, characterized by urinary excretion of abnormal amounts or types of organic acids. The diagnosis is usually made by detecting an abnormal pattern of organic acids in a urine sample by gas chromatography-mass spectrometry. In some conditions, the urine is always abnormal, in others, the characteristic substances are only present intermittently. Many of the organic acidemias are detectable by newborn screening with tandem mass spectrometry.

These disorders vary in their prognosis, from manageable to fatal, and usually affect more than one organ system, especially the central nervous system.

Neurological damage and developmental delay are common factors in diagnosis, with associated symptoms ranging from poor feeding to slow growth, lethargy, vomiting, dehydration, malnutrition, hypoglycemia, hypotonia, metabolic acidosis, ketoacidosis, hyperammonemia, and if left untreated, death.

== Treatment ==
Treatment or management of organic acidemias vary; e.g. see methylmalonic acidemia, propionic acidemia, isovaleric acidemia, and maple syrup urine disease.

As of 1984 there were no effective treatments for all of the conditions, though treatment for some included a limited protein/high carbohydrate diet, intravenous fluids, amino acid substitution, vitamin supplementation, carnitine, induced anabolism, and in some cases, tube-feeding.

As of 1993 beta-ketothiolase deficiency and other OAs were managed by trying to restore biochemical and physiologic homeostasis; common therapies included restricting diet to avoid the precursor amino acids and use of compounds to either dispose of toxic metabolites or increase enzyme activity.

== See also ==
- ACAT1 § Ketothiolase deficiency, another type of OA
