= C26H44N7O17P3S =

The molecular formula C_{26}H_{44}N_{7}O_{17}P_{3}S (molar mass: 851.65 g/mol, exact mass: 851.1727 u) may refer to:

- Isovaleryl-CoA
- 2-Methylbutyryl-CoA
