= 3-oxoadipyl-CoA thiolase =

Class of enzymes

Identifiers
- EC no.: 2.3.1.174

Databases
- IntEnz: IntEnz view
- BRENDA: BRENDA entry
- ExPASy: NiceZyme view
- KEGG: KEGG entry
- MetaCyc: metabolic pathway
- PRIAM: profile
- PDB structures: RCSB PDB PDBe PDBsum
Search
- PMC: articles
- PubMed: articles
- NCBI: proteins

In enzymology, a 3-oxoadipyl-CoA thiolase (EC 2.3.1.174) is an enzyme that catalyzes the chemical reaction

succinyl-CoA + acetyl-CoA $\rightleftharpoons$ CoA + 3-oxoadipyl-CoA

Thus, the two substrates of this enzyme are succinyl-CoA and acetyl-CoA, whereas its two products are CoA and 3-oxoadipyl-CoA.

This enzyme belongs to the family of transferases, specifically those acyltransferases transferring groups other than aminoacyl groups. The systematic name of this enzyme class is succinyl-CoA:acetyl-CoA C-succinyltransferase. This enzyme participates in benzoate degradation via hydroxylation.

3-Oxoadipyl-CoA thiolase belongs to the thiolase family of enzymes.
