= ACAA2 =

Gene

Identifiers
- Aliases: ACAA2, DSAEC, acetyl-CoA acyltransferase 2
- External IDs: OMIM: 604770; MGI: 1098623; GeneCards: ACAA2
Available structures
PDB	Ortholog search: PDBe RCSB
PDB	List of PDB id codes 4C2J, 4C2K
Enzyme activity
EC #	BRENDA	ExPASy	KEGG	MetaCyc
2.3.1.9	↗	↗	↗	↗
2.3.1.16	↗	↗	↗	↗
3.1.2.1	↗	↗	↗	↗
3.1.2.2	↗	↗	↗	↗

Gene location (Human)
Chr.	Chromosome 18 (human)
Band	18q21.1	Start	49,782,164 bp
Band	18q21.1	End	49,813,953 bp

Gene location (Mouse)
Chr.	Chromosome 18 (mouse)
Band	18 E2|18 50.76 cM	Start	74,912,268 bp
Band	18 E2|18 50.76 cM	End	74,939,279 bp
RNA expression pattern
Bgee	Human / Mouse (ortholog); Top expressed in: right lobe of liver; mucosa of transverse colon; apex of heart; rectum; left ventricle; right auricle of heart; muscle of thigh; gastric mucosa; islet of Langerhans; ventricular zone / Top expressed in: gallbladder; cardiac muscle tissue of left ventricle; Ileal epithelium; interventricular septum; right ventricle; choroid plexus of fourth ventricle; left lobe of liver; extraocular muscle; superior surface of tongue; corneal stroma; More reference expression data
BioGPS	n/a
Gene ontology
Molecular function	transferase activity; acyltransferase activity; protein binding; catalytic activity; acyltransferase activity, transferring groups other than amino-acyl groups; acetyl-CoA C-acyltransferase activity; RNA binding; acetyl-CoA C-acetyltransferase activity
Cellular component	mitochondrial inner membrane; extracellular exosome; mitochondrion; mitochondrial matrix
Biological process	negative regulation of mitochondrial membrane permeability involved in apoptotic process; negative regulation of mitochondrial outer membrane permeabilization involved in apoptotic signaling pathway; cholesterol biosynthetic process; metabolism; cellular response to hypoxia; fatty acid metabolic process; lipid metabolism; fatty acid beta-oxidation
Sources:Amigo / QuickGO
Orthologs
Databases	NCBI: entry; OMA: entry
Species	Human	Mouse
Entrez	10449	52538
Ensembl	ENSG00000167315	ENSMUSG00000036880
UniProt	P42765	Q8BWT1
RefSeq (mRNA)	NM_006111	NM_177470
RefSeq (protein)	NP_006102	NP_803421
Location (UCSC)	Chr 18: 49.78 – 49.81 Mb	Chr 18: 74.91 – 74.94 Mb
PubMed search
- Wikidata
View/Edit Human	View/Edit Mouse

3-Ketoacyl-CoA thiolase, mitochondrial also known as acetyl-Coenzyme A acyltransferase 2 is an enzyme that in humans is encoded by the ACAA2 gene.

Acetyl-Coenzyme A acyltransferase 2 is an acetyl-CoA C-acyltransferase enzyme.

== Structure ==
The ACAA2 gene encodes a 41.9 kDa protein that is composed of 397 amino acids and contains 88 observed peptides.

== Function ==
The encoded protein catalyzes the last step of the mitochondrial fatty acid beta oxidation spiral. Unlike most mitochondrial matrix proteins, it contains a non-cleavable amino-terminal targeting signal. ACAA2 has been shown to be a functional BNIP3 binding partner, which provides a possible link between fatty acid metabolism and cell apoptosis.

== Clinical significance ==
To date, mutations or variants have not been identified in any clinical diseases. However, the ACAA2 locus has been associated with abnormal blood lipid levels, particularly HDL and LDL cholesterol levels; in addition, this locus has also been correlated with an individual's risk for coronary artery disease.
