= Mitochondrial trifunctional protein deficiency =

- Other names: TFP deficiency
- Mitochondrial trifunctional protein deficiency has an autosomal recessive pattern of inheritance
- Symptoms: Cardiomyopathy, skeletal myopathy
- Types: Mutations in the HADHA and HADHB gene
- Diagnostic method: CBC, Urine test
- Treatment: Low fat diet, Limited exercise

Mitochondrial trifunctional protein deficiency (MTP deficiency or MTPD) is an autosomal recessive fatty acid oxidation disorder that prevents the body from converting certain fats to energy, particularly during periods without food.

People with this disorder have inadequate levels of an enzyme that breaks down a certain group of fats called long-chain fatty acids.

== Signs and symptoms ==
The presentation of mitochondrial trifunctional protein deficiency may begin during infancy, features that occur are: low blood sugar, weak muscle tone, and liver problems. Infants with this disorder are at risk for heart problems, breathing difficulties, and pigmentary retinopathy. Signs and symptoms of mitochondrial trifunctional protein deficiency that may begin after infancy include hypotonia, muscle pain, a breakdown of muscle tissue, and a loss of sensation in the extremities called peripheral neuropathy. Some who have MTP deficiency show a progressive course associated with myopathy, and recurrent rhabdomyolysis.

== Genetics ==
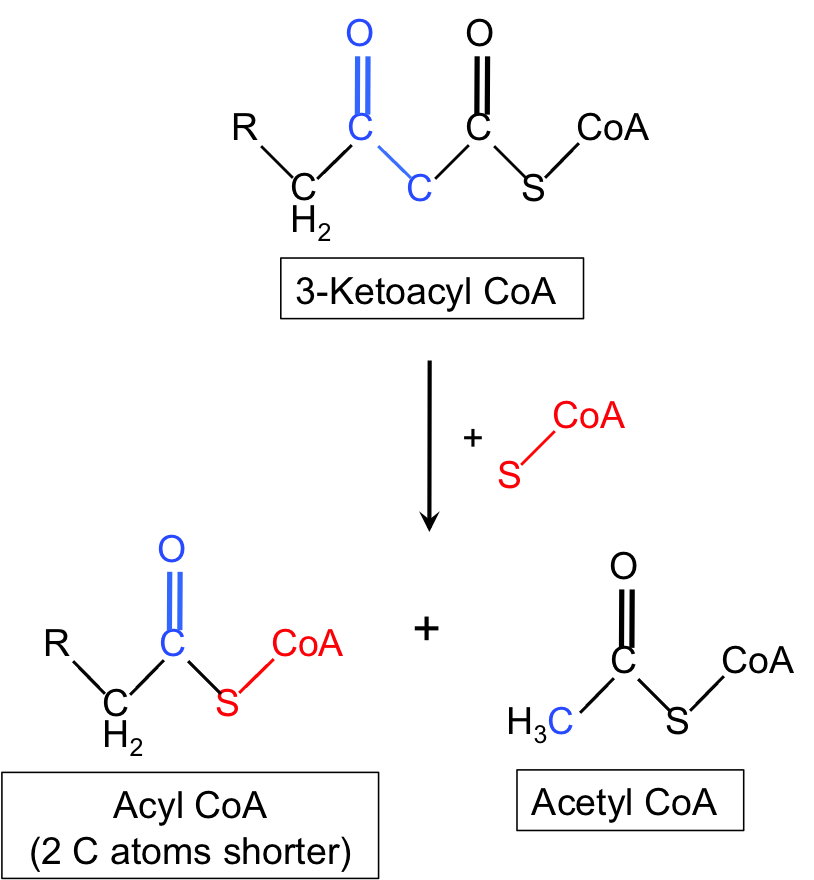
HADHB function in beta-oxidation

The genetics of mitochondrial trifunctional protein deficiency is based on mutations in the HADHA and HADHB genes which cause this disorder. These genes each provide instructions for making part of an enzyme complex called mitochondrial trifunctional protein. This enzyme complex functions in mitochondria, the energy-producing centers within cells: mitochondrial trifunctional protein contains three enzymes that each perform a different function. This enzyme complex is required to metabolize a group of fats called long-chain fatty acids. These fatty acids are stored in the body's fat tissues and are a major source of energy for the heart and muscles. During periods of fasting, fatty acids are also an important energy source for the liver and other tissues.

Mutations in the HADHA or HADHB genes that cause mitochondrial trifunctional protein deficiency disrupt all functions of this enzyme complex. Without enough of this enzyme complex, long-chain fatty acids cannot be metabolized. As a result, these fatty acids are not converted to energy, which can lead to some features of this disorder. Long-chain fatty acids may also build up and damage the liver, heart, and muscles. This abnormal buildup causes other symptoms of mitochondrial trifunctional protein deficiency.

== Mechanism ==
The mechanism of this condition indicates that the mitochondrial trifunction protein catalyzes 3 steps in mitochondrial beta-oxidation of fatty acids: long-chain 3-hydroxyacyl-CoA dehydrogenase (LCHAD), long-chain enoyl-CoA hydratase, and long-chain thiolase activities. Trifunctional protein deficiency is characterized by decreased activity of all 3 enzymes. Clinically, trifunctional protein deficiency usually results in sudden unexplained infant death, cardiomyopathy, or skeletal myopathy.

== Diagnosis ==
Diagnosis of mitochondrial trifunctional protein deficiency is often confirmed using tandem mass spectrometry. Genetic counseling is available for this condition. Additionally the following exams are available:

- CBC
- Urine test

== Treatment ==
Glucose.

Management for mitochondrial trifunctional protein deficiency entails the following:

- Avoiding factors that might precipitate condition
- Glucose
- Low fat/high carbohydrate nutrition

== See also ==
- Long-chain acyl-CoA dehydrogenase
