= Long-chain acyl-CoA dehydrogenase =

Identifiers
- EC no.: 1.3.8.8
- CAS no.: 59536-74-2

Databases
- BRENDA: enzyme data
- ExPASy: NiceZyme view
- KEGG: enzyme entry
- MetaCyc: metabolic pathway
- Rhea: reactions
- PDB structures: RCSB PDB PDBe PDBsum
- Gene Ontology: AmiGO / QuickGO
Search
- PMC: articles
- PubMed: articles
- NCBI: proteins

Long-chain acyl-CoA dehydrogenase (EC 1.3.8.8, palmitoyl-CoA dehydrogenase, palmitoyl-coenzyme A dehydrogenase, long-chain acyl-coenzyme A dehydrogenase, long-chain-acyl-CoA:(acceptor) 2,3-oxidoreductase, ACADL (gene).) is an enzyme with systematic name long-chain acyl-CoA:electron-transfer flavoprotein 2,3-oxidoreductase. This enzyme catalyses the following chemical reaction

a long-chain acyl-CoA + electron-transfer flavoprotein $\rightleftharpoons$ a long-chain trans-2,3-dehydroacyl-CoA + reduced electron-transfer flavoprotein

This enzyme contains FAD as prosthetic group and participates in fatty acid metabolism and PPAR signaling pathway. Mitochondrial mutations in this enzyme may be associated with some forms of dilated cardiomyopathy.
