= ACAA1 =

Protein-coding gene in the species Homo sapiens

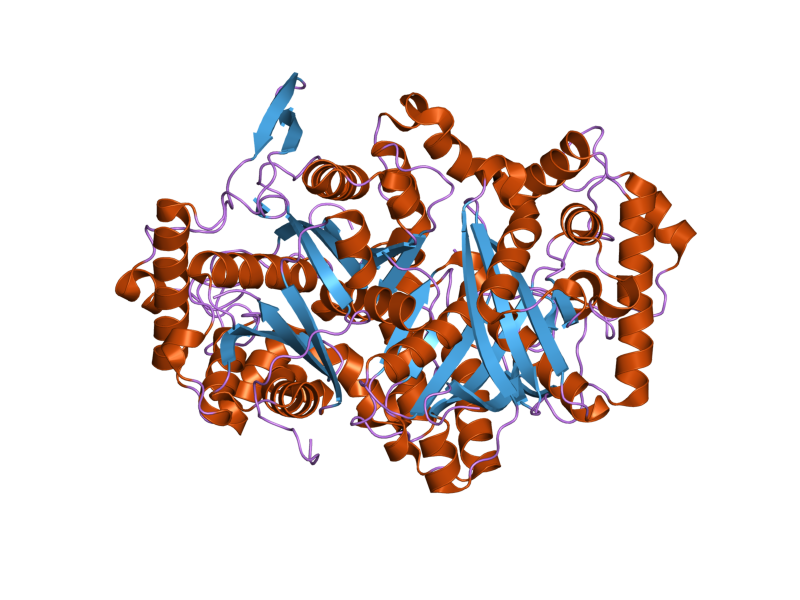

Identifiers
- Aliases: ACAA1, ACAA, PTHIO, THIO, acetyl-CoA acyltransferase 1, Lnc-Myd88
- External IDs: OMIM: 604054; MGI: 2148491; GeneCards: ACAA1
Available structures
PDB	Ortholog search: PDBe RCSB
PDB	List of PDB id codes 2IIK
Enzyme activity
EC #	BRENDA	ExPASy	KEGG	MetaCyc
2.3.1.9	↗	↗	↗	↗
2.3.1.16	↗	↗	↗	↗
2.3.1.155	↗	↗	↗	↗

Gene location (Human)
Chr.	Chromosome 3 (human)
Band	3p22.2	Start	38,103,129 bp
Band	3p22.2	End	38,137,242 bp

Gene location (Mouse)
Chr.	Chromosome 9 (mouse)
Band	9 F3|9 71.33 cM	Start	119,168,742 bp
Band	9 F3|9 71.33 cM	End	119,179,365 bp
RNA expression pattern
Bgee	Human / Mouse (ortholog); Top expressed in: jejunal mucosa; right lobe of liver; mucosa of transverse colon; duodenum; kidney tubule; human kidney; renal medulla; apex of heart; granulocyte; body of pancreas / Top expressed in: Ileal epithelium; lip; right kidney; choroid plexus of fourth ventricle; motor neuron; aortic valve; interventricular septum; corneal stroma; ascending aorta; fossa; More reference expression data
BioGPS	n/a
Gene ontology
Molecular function	transferase activity; acyltransferase activity, transferring groups other than amino-acyl groups; protein binding; catalytic activity; palmitoyl-CoA oxidase activity; acyltransferase activity; acetate CoA-transferase activity; acetyl-CoA C-acyltransferase activity
Cellular component	membrane; intracellular membrane-bounded organelle; peroxisome; peroxisomal matrix; extracellular region; specific granule lumen; cytosol
Biological process	lipid metabolism; bile acid metabolic process; alpha-linolenic acid metabolic process; very long-chain fatty acid metabolic process; fatty acid metabolic process; fatty acid beta-oxidation using acyl-CoA oxidase; fatty acid beta-oxidation; metabolism; neutrophil degranulation; protein targeting to peroxisome; phenylacetate catabolic process
Sources:Amigo / QuickGO
Orthologs
Databases	NCBI: entry; OMA: entry
Species	Human	Mouse
Entrez	30	113868
Ensembl	ENSG00000060971	ENSMUSG00000036138
UniProt	P09110	Q921H8
RefSeq (mRNA)	NM_001130410; NM_001607	NM_130864; NM_001357516
RefSeq (protein)	NP_001123882; NP_001598; NP_001598.1	NP_570934; NP_001344445
Location (UCSC)	Chr 3: 38.1 – 38.14 Mb	Chr 9: 119.17 – 119.18 Mb
PubMed search
- Wikidata
View/Edit Human	View/Edit Mouse

3-Ketoacyl-CoA thiolase, peroxisomal also known as acetyl-Coenzyme A acyltransferase 1 is an enzyme that in humans is encoded by the ACAA1 gene.

Acetyl-Coenzyme A acyltransferase 1 is an acetyl-CoA C-acyltransferase enzyme.

== Function ==
This gene encodes an enzyme operative in the beta oxidation system of the peroxisomes.

== Clinical significance ==
Deficiency of this enzyme leads to pseudo-Zellweger syndrome.
