= TMEM126A =

Protein-coding gene in humans

Identifiers
- Aliases: TMEM126A, OPA7, transmembrane protein 126A
- External IDs: OMIM: 612988; MGI: 1913521; HomoloGene: 11939; GeneCards: TMEM126A; OMA:TMEM126A - orthologs

Gene location (Human)
Chr.	Chromosome 11 (human)
Band	11q14.1	Start	85,647,967 bp
Band	11q14.1	End	85,656,547 bp

Gene location (Mouse)
Chr.	Chromosome 7 (mouse)
Band	7|7 E1	Start	90,099,908 bp
Band	7|7 E1	End	90,106,437 bp
RNA expression pattern
Bgee	Human / Mouse (ortholog); Top expressed in: myocardium of left ventricle; tibialis anterior muscle; deltoid muscle; right ventricle; quadriceps femoris muscle; vastus lateralis muscle; mucosa of ileum; biceps brachii; oocyte; Skeletal muscle tissue of biceps brachii / Top expressed in: intercostal muscle; digastric muscle; sternocleidomastoid muscle; myocardium of ventricle; temporal muscle; triceps brachii muscle; interventricular septum; quadriceps femoris muscle; soleus muscle; cardiac muscle tissue of left ventricle; More reference expression data
BioGPS	n/a
Gene ontology
Molecular function	molecular function
Cellular component	integral component of membrane; mitochondrial inner membrane; mitochondrion; membrane
Biological process	optic nerve development
Sources:Amigo / QuickGO
Orthologs
Species	Human	Mouse
Entrez	84233	66271
Ensembl	ENSG00000171202	ENSMUSG00000030615
UniProt	Q9H061	Q9D8Y1
RefSeq (mRNA)	NM_032273; NM_001244735	NM_025460
RefSeq (protein)	NP_001231664; NP_115649	NP_079736
Location (UCSC)	Chr 11: 85.65 – 85.66 Mb	Chr 7: 90.1 – 90.11 Mb
PubMed search
- Wikidata
View/Edit Human	View/Edit Mouse

Transmembrane protein 126A is a mitochondrial transmembrane protein of unknown function coded for by the TMEM126A gene.

A nonsense mutation in the TMEM126A gene has been shown to be related to optic atrophy. TMEM126A shows higher levels of expression in the parathyroid gland as well as in the peripheral blood cells of Huntington's disease patients, indicating that expression of this protein has some relation to blood regulation.

TMEM126A has two isoforms and is found on the long arm of Chromosome 11 in region 1, band 4, sub-band 1. It is produced by the TMEM126 gene, which codes for a mRNA 726 base pairs long. which translates into a protein 195 amino acids long. In addition, this gene is expressed 1.8 times the average of a normal gene and has expression with the prostate, uterus, kidney, placenta, heart, brain, and a large number of other tissues.

== Gene ==
=== Locus ===
TMEM126 is located on the long arm of chromosome 11 in humans. It is found on the first sub-band of the fourth band within the first region. This can be written as 11q14.1.

=== Aliases ===
TMEM126A is also known as OPA7 and DKFZp586c1924.

== Homology/evolutionary history ==
TMEM126A has been highly conserved among mammals, never dropping below 60% sequence identity when aligned with the same protein sequence from other species. It has been less well conserved outside of mammals, although it is evident in both fish, birds, and some invertebrates.

=== Orthologs ===
	Genus and species	Common name	Date of divergence	Accession number	Sequence length	Sequence identity	Sequence similarity	Notes
1	Gorilla gorilla	Gorilla	8.8 mya	XP_004051968	195	98%	98%	Predicted
2	Pongo abelii	Orangutan	15.7 mya	NP_001127371.1	196	97%	98%	Three transmembrane regions
3	Macaca mulatta	Rhesus macaque	29.0 mya	NP_001248065	195	92%	95%	
4	Bos Taurus	Cow	94.2 mya	NP_001032697	197	81%	87%	Three transmembrane regions
5	Canis lupus familiaris	Dog	94.2 mya	XP_850546	197	80%	87%	Predicted
6	Felis catus	Cat	94.2 mya	XP_003992716	197	78%	87%	Predicted
7	Sus scrofa	Wild boar	94.2 mya	NP_001230521	196	76%	86%	
8	Mus musculus	Mouse	92.3 mya	NP_079736	196	71%	84%	Three transmembrane regions
9	Rattus norvegicus	Brown rat	92.3 mya	NP_001011557	196	70%	81%	Three transmembrane regions
10	Ornithorhynchus anatinus	Platypus	167.4 mya	XP_001514960	126	69%	82%	
11	Sarcophilus harrisii	Tasmanian Devil	162.6 mya	XP_003764651	208	63%	80%	Predicted
12	Salmo salar	Atlantic salmon	400.1 mya	NP_001134999	206	47%	63%	
13	Gallus gallus	Chicken	296.0 mya	XP_003640643	209	46%	70%	Low quality. Predicted.
14	Danio rerio	Zebra fish	400.1 mya	NP_957092	201	44%	67%	
15	Xenopus laevis	African clawed frog	371.2 mya	NP_001079826	203	52%	69%	
16	Cavia porcellus	Guinea pig	92.3 mya	XP_003468633	195	74%	83%	
17	Ciona intestinalis	Vase tunicate	722.5 mya	XP_002124594	230	28%	46%	

=== Paralogs ===
TMEM126A has a single paralog: TMEM126B. It is also found at 11q14.1 and is also known as HT007. TMEM126B shares 36% sequence identity and 49% sequence similarity with TMEM126A. The central domain is conserved between TMEM126A and TMEM126B.

== mRNA ==
=== Promoter Analysis ===
Promoter sequence:

TTCACCCAACACTGCTTCCAAATAAGCAGTACTCTGGAGAACACGAGAAATCCTCAGAAAAATAAGCTGCAGCTCTGAGG

TGCTGATTATGGTAGGGCAATCAATACAGATCAAAACATGGCACAGGGAGCTTAAGTTCCTAGGGAGAGTAGAAAATCGA

TAGAGCCAAGAAATAGCTCACCTTTGACTTATTTTTAACCTGAGTAGCTATCATATGCCAAGAGCTGTGCAGTTTTCATT

TACCCCATGCCAAGAACGTAAGTAGGCTCTACTGACCAGGAAGTTAAGTAATATGCCCGAGGTACGTTTTCAATGGAAGA

GGCTGACTGAGGGTCACCCAACTTATATCTCGAAATTTCACAATTTCTACAAGTTCTGTCCTGGGAGGCAAGAGTAGGTG

AAACGAGCACACTCTACGCCAGGCAAACAAACCTCAACGCTTAGCCTCCCGGCACCTCCTAGGGCCGGAAGCTTCTCAGC

CCAAAGCCGCTGCTGGCTGCAACCTCCGTCCCGCAGTCCAATTAGCAGCCGCGACCCGGCGCCCGCCCACGCCGCGTCAC

GAGTCAGCCAAAGATGGCTGCGCCCAGGTAATTTGAGCAAAGGCCACAGTGAACTCCGGCGTGGCTGAGGAAGGAGGAGG

CACCCACAGGCTGCTGGGAGGAGAGCATAAGGTACTGGTATTCCGGGGGAGGGGGTGAAGTAAATGTCCCGGTGTCAGGA

GAAGCACGACGCGG

Species	Max Identity
Gorilla gorilla/Western gorilla	97%
Pan paniscus	96%
Pan troglodytes/Chimpanzee	95%
Papio anubis	92%
Pongo pygmaeus/Bornean orangutan	92%
Macaca mullata	90%

There was only one promoter sequence found by using ElDorado on Genomatix. It is 734 base pairs long and found far upstream of the coding region of TMEM126A. The promoter sequence experiences extremely high levels of expression among primates but could not be found in any other species.

=== mRNA Folding ===
The minimum free energy formation has a number of hairpin loops and bulges. Another formation exists with a much larger bulge but which maintains the same hairpin loops.

TMEM126A has a number of likely locations for the formation of hairpin loops, four of which are extremely likely.

=== Alternative Splicing ===
In some circumstances, the second exon of the TMEM126A mRNA can be spliced out. This exon contains the main starting codon for the gene. The loss of this region would delay the start of translation until the next methionine, which occurs later in exon 3. Ultimately, this causes a loss of a great deal of genetic information from exons 2 and three.

== Protein ==
=== Isoforms ===
The protein has three isoforms (a, b and c). The first isoform is the main version and the longest while the other two are both shorter.

=== Secondary structure ===
TMEM126A has a mixture of alpha helices, beta strands and coils that make up its secondary structure. There are two regions of high alpha-helix density which correspond to the transmembrane regions of the protein.

=== Domains and motifs ===
TMEM126A contains four exons, two transmembrane regions, and three stem-loop capable regions.

=== Post-translational modifications ===
Hydrophobic sites found on the transmembrane protein TMEM126A

A peptide interaction can be found at amino acid 82 and continues to amino acid 90. This regions has good solubility, thanks to the presence of both cysteine and valine, is not conserved in rabbits, which allows for antibody production, and demonstrates high hydrophobicity.

In addition, there are two glycosylation sites at amino acids 13 and 60. as well as one phosphorylation site at amino acid 40

== Expression ==
TMEM126A is expressed ubiquitously throughout the human body at 1.8 times the normal expression level for human genes. It experiences especially high expression in the parathyroid gland. In addition, TMEM126A experiences higher levels of expression in peripheral blood cells in patients diagnosed with Huntington's disease as well as individuals who experience ocular dominance.

== Interacting proteins ==
TMEM126A interacts with a number of proteins. MYC and MAX form a complex and promote transcription. There is interaction with ATP synthase and the optic atrophy protein. These interactions relate to the proteins function in the mitochondria as well as its medical applications.

== Clinical significance ==
A nonsense mutation in the TMEM126A gene has been shown to be related to optic atrophy. This mutation occurs on the second exon of the protein. The mutation results in decreased expression of TMEM126A. It has been demonstrated that a mutated TMEM126A gene can be distinguished from a normal gene through the use of antibodies which recognize the differences between the two. Experiments have shown that it associates with CD137L in myeloid cells.
