= Propanoyl-CoA C-acyltransferase =

Class of enzymes

Identifiers
- EC no.: 2.3.1.176

Databases
- IntEnz: IntEnz view
- BRENDA: BRENDA entry
- ExPASy: NiceZyme view
- KEGG: KEGG entry
- MetaCyc: metabolic pathway
- PRIAM: profile
- PDB structures: RCSB PDB PDBe PDBsum
Search
- PMC: articles
- PubMed: articles
- NCBI: proteins

In enzymology, a propanoyl-CoA C-acyltransferase (EC 2.3.1.176) is an enzyme that catalyzes the chemical reaction

3alpha,7alpha,12alpha-trihydroxy-5beta-cholanoyl-CoA + propanoyl-CoA $\rightleftharpoons$ CoA + 3alpha,7alpha,12alpha-trihydroxy-24-oxo-5beta-cholestanoyl-CoA

Thus, the two substrates of this enzyme are 3alpha,7alpha,12alpha-trihydroxy-5beta-cholanoyl-CoA and propanoyl-CoA, whereas its two products are CoA and 3alpha,7alpha,12alpha-trihydroxy-24-oxo-5beta-cholestanoyl-CoA.

This enzyme belongs to the family of transferases, specifically those acyltransferases transferring groups other than aminoacyl groups. The systematic name of this enzyme class is 3alpha,7alpha,12alpha-trihydroxy-5beta-cholanoyl-CoA:propanoyl-CoA C-acyltransferase. Other names in common use include peroxisomal thiolase 2, sterol carrier protein-, SCP, and PTE-2 (ambiguous). This enzyme participates in ppar signaling pathway.

Propanoyl-CoA C-acyltransferase belongs to the thiolase family of enzymes.
