= ACAT2 =

Protein-coding gene in the species Homo sapiens

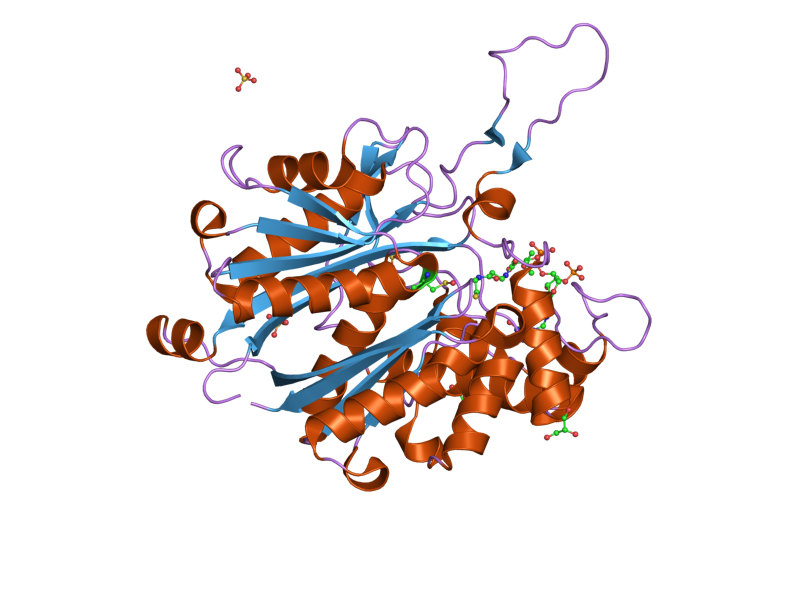

Identifiers
- Aliases: ACAT2, acetyl-CoA acetyltransferase 2
- External IDs: OMIM: 100678; MGI: 87871; GeneCards: ACAT2
Available structures
PDB	Ortholog search: PDBe RCSB
PDB	List of PDB id codes 1WL4, 1WL5
Enzyme activity
EC #	BRENDA	ExPASy	KEGG	MetaCyc
2.3.1.9	↗	↗	↗	↗

Gene location (Human)
Chr.	Chromosome 6 (human)
Band	6q25.3	Start	159,762,045 bp
Band	6q25.3	End	159,779,112 bp

Gene location (Mouse)
Chr.	Chromosome 17 (mouse)
Band	17 A1|17 8.73 cM	Start	13,161,777 bp
Band	17 A1|17 8.73 cM	End	13,179,634 bp
RNA expression pattern
Bgee	Human / Mouse (ortholog); Top expressed in: ventricular zone; ganglionic eminence; pons; right lobe of liver; skin of thigh; C1 segment; mucosa of transverse colon; mucosa of esophagus; islet of Langerhans; prefrontal cortex / Top expressed in: condyle; fossa; internal carotid artery; external carotid artery; superior cervical ganglion; motor neuron; cumulus cell; medial ganglionic eminence; maxillary prominence; mandibular prominence; More reference expression data
BioGPS	n/a
Gene ontology
Molecular function	transferase activity; acyltransferase activity; catalytic activity; protein binding; acyltransferase activity, transferring groups other than amino-acyl groups; acetyl-CoA C-acetyltransferase activity; acetyl-CoA C-acyltransferase activity
Cellular component	cytoplasm; nucleolus; extracellular exosome; nucleus; mitochondrion; cytosol
Biological process	metabolism; lipid metabolism; fatty acid beta-oxidation; cholesterol biosynthetic process
Sources:Amigo / QuickGO
Orthologs
Databases	NCBI: entry; OMA: entry
Species	Human	Mouse
Entrez	39	110460
Ensembl	ENSG00000120437	ENSMUSG00000023832
UniProt	Q9BWD1	Q8CAY6
RefSeq (mRNA)	NM_005891; NM_001303253	NM_009338
RefSeq (protein)	NP_001290182; NP_005882	NP_033364
Location (UCSC)	Chr 6: 159.76 – 159.78 Mb	Chr 17: 13.16 – 13.18 Mb
PubMed search
- Wikidata
View/Edit Human	View/Edit Mouse

Acetyl-CoA acetyltransferase, cytosolic, also known as cytosolic acetoacetyl-CoA thiolase, is an enzyme that in humans is encoded by the ACAT2 (acetyl-Coenzyme A acetyltransferase 2) gene

Acetyl-Coenzyme A acetyltransferase 2 is an acetyl-CoA C-acetyltransferase enzyme.

== Gene ==
This gene shows complementary overlapping with the 3-prime region of the TCP1 gene in both mouse and human. These genes are encoded on opposite strands of DNA, as well as in opposite transcriptional orientation.
