= Isovaleric acidemia =

Medical condition disrupting normal metabolism

- Other names: Isovaleric aciduria, Isovaleric acid CoA dehydrogenase deficiency
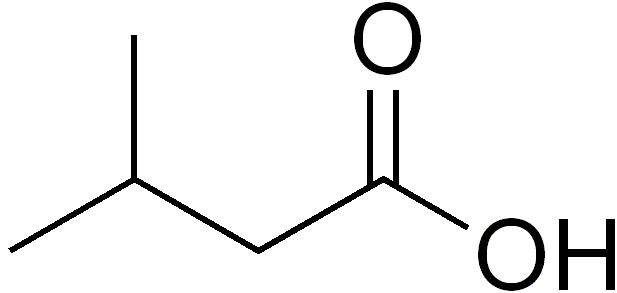
- Isovaleric acid
- Specialty: Endocrinology

Isovaleric acidemia is a rare autosomal recessive metabolic disorder which disrupts or prevents normal metabolism of the branched-chain amino acid leucine. It is a classical type of organic acidemia.

== Symptoms and signs ==
A characteristic feature of isovaleric acidemia is a distinctive odor of sweaty feet. This odor is caused by the buildup of a compound called isovaleric acid in affected individuals.

In about half of cases, the signs and symptoms of this disorder become apparent within a few days after birth and include poor feeding, vomiting, seizures, and lack of energy that can progress to coma. These medical problems are typically severe and can be life-threatening. In the other half of cases, the signs and symptoms of the disorder appear during childhood and may come and go over time. They are often triggered by an infection.

== Genetics ==
Isovaleric acidemia has an autosomal recessive pattern of inheritance.

The disorder has an autosomal recessive inheritance pattern, which means the defective gene is located on an autosome, and two copies of the gene – one from each parent – must be inherited to be affected by the disorder. The parents of a child with an autosomal recessive disorder are carriers of one copy of the defective gene, but are usually not affected by the disorder.

Mutations in both copies of the IVD gene result in isovaleric acidemia.

== Pathophysiology ==
The enzyme encoded by IVD, isovaleric acid-CoA dehydrogenase (EC 1.3.99.10), plays an essential role in breaking down proteins from the diet. Specifically, the enzyme is responsible for the third step in processing leucine, an essential amino acid. If a mutation in the IVD gene reduces or eliminates the activity of this enzyme, the body is unable to break down leucine properly. As a result, isovaleric acid and related compounds build up to toxic levels, damaging the brain and nervous system.

== Diagnosis ==
The urine of newborns can be screened for isovaleric acidemia using mass spectrometry, allowing for early diagnosis. Elevations of isovalerylglycine in urine and of isovalerylcarnitine in plasma are found.

== Screening ==
On 9 May 2014, the UK National Screening Committee (UK NSC) announced its recommendation to screen every newborn baby in the UK for four further genetic disorders as part of its NHS Newborn Blood Spot Screening programme, including isovaleric acidemia.

== Treatment ==
Treatment consists of dietary protein restriction, particularly leucine. During acute episodes, glycine is sometimes given, which conjugates with isovalerate forming isovalerylglycine, or carnitine which has a similar effect.

Elevated 3-hydroxyisovaleric acid is a clinical biomarker of biotin deficiency. Without biotin, leucine and isoleucine cannot be metabolized normally and results in elevated synthesis of isovaleric acid and consequently 3-hydroxyisovaleric acid, isovalerylglycine, and other isovaleric acid metabolites as well. Elevated serum 3-hydroxyisovaleric acid concentrations can be caused by supplementation with 3-hydroxyisovaleric acid, genetic conditions, or dietary deficiency of biotin. Some patients with isovaleric acidemia may benefit from supplemental biotin. Biotin deficiency on its own can have severe physiological and cognitive consequences that closely resemble symptoms of organic acidemias.

== Prognosis ==
A 2011 review of 176 cases found that diagnoses made early in life (within a few days of birth) were associated with more severe disease and a mortality of 33%. Children diagnosed later, and who had milder symptoms, showed a lower mortality rate of ~3%.

== Epidemiology ==
Isovaleric acidemia is estimated to affect at least 1 in 250,000 births in the United States.

== See also ==
- Maple syrup urine disease
- Methylmalonic acidemia
- Propionic acidemia
