= 2-Methylbutyryl-CoA =

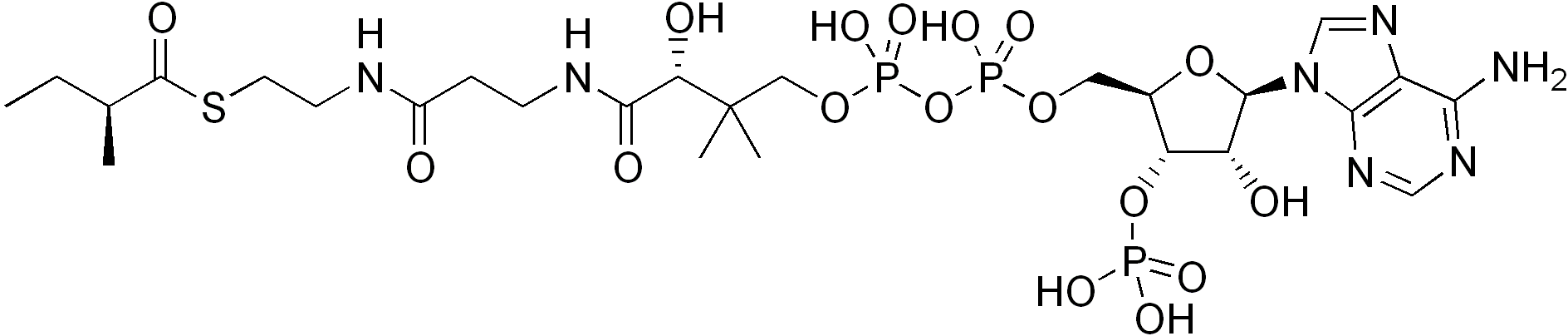

Names
- Other names 2-Methylbutyryl-coenzyme A

Identifiers
CAS Number	6712-02-3
3D model (JSmol)	Interactive image
ChemSpider	388491
PubChem CID	23724628
CompTox Dashboard (EPA)	DTXSID00745424
- InChI: InChI=1S/C26H44N7O17P3S/c1-5-14(2)25(38)54-9-8-28-16(34)6-7-29-23(37)20(36)26(3,4)11-47-53(44,45)50-52(42,43)46-10-15-19(49-51(39,40)41)18(35)24(48-15)33-13-32-17-21(27)30-12-31-22(17)33/h12-15,18-20,24,35-36H,5-11H2,1-4H3,(H,28,34)(H,29,37)(H,42,43)(H,44,45)(H2,27,30,31)(H2,39,40,41)/t14?,15-,18-,19-,20?,24-/m1/s1 Key: LYNVNYDEQMMNMZ-PCLZRLGGSA-N
- SMILES: CCC(C)C(=O)SCCNC(=O)CCNC(=O)C(C(C)(C)COP(=O)(O)OP(=O)(O)OCC1C(C(C(O1)N2C=NC3=C2N=CN=C3N)O)OP(=O)(O)O)O

Properties
Chemical formula	C_{26}H_{44}N_{7}O_{17}P_{3}S
Molar mass	851.65 g/mol
- Except where otherwise noted, data are given for materials in their standard state (at 25 °C [77 °F], 100 kPa). verify (what is ?) Infobox references

2-Methylbutyryl-CoA is an intermediate in the metabolism of isoleucine.

== See also ==
- 2-Methylbutyryl-CoA dehydrogenase deficiency
