= Propionyl-CoA C2-trimethyltridecanoyltransferase =

propionyl-CoA C2-trimethyltridecanoyltransferase

Identifiers
- EC no.: 2.3.1.154

Databases
- IntEnz: IntEnz view
- BRENDA: BRENDA entry
- ExPASy: NiceZyme view
- KEGG: KEGG entry
- MetaCyc: metabolic pathway
- PRIAM: profile
- PDB structures: RCSB PDB PDBe PDBsum
- Gene Ontology: AmiGO / QuickGO
Search
- PMC: articles
- PubMed: articles
- NCBI: proteins

In enzymology, a propionyl-CoA C2-trimethyltridecanoyltransferase (EC 2.3.1.154) is an enzyme that catalyzes the chemical reaction

4,8,12-trimethyltridecanoyl-CoA + propanoyl-CoA $\rightleftharpoons$ 3-oxopristanoyl-CoA + CoA

Thus, the two substrates of this enzyme are 4,8,12-trimethyltridecanoyl-CoA and propanoyl-CoA, whereas its two products are 3-oxopristanoyl-CoA and CoA.

This enzyme belongs to the family of transferases, specifically those acyltransferases transferring groups other than aminoacyl groups. The systematic name of this enzyme class is 4,8,12-trimethyltridecanoyl-CoA:propanoyl-CoA C2-4,8,12-trimethyltridecanoyltransferase. Other names in common use include 3-oxopristanoyl-CoA hydrolase, 3-oxopristanoyl-CoA thiolase, peroxisome sterol carrier protein thiolase, sterol carrier protein, oxopristanoyl-CoA thiolase, peroxisomal 3-oxoacyl coenzyme A thiolase, SCPx, 4,8,12-trimethyltridecanoyl-CoA:propanoyl-CoA, and 2-C-4,8,12-trimethyltridecanoyltransferase.
