= SCP2 =

Protein

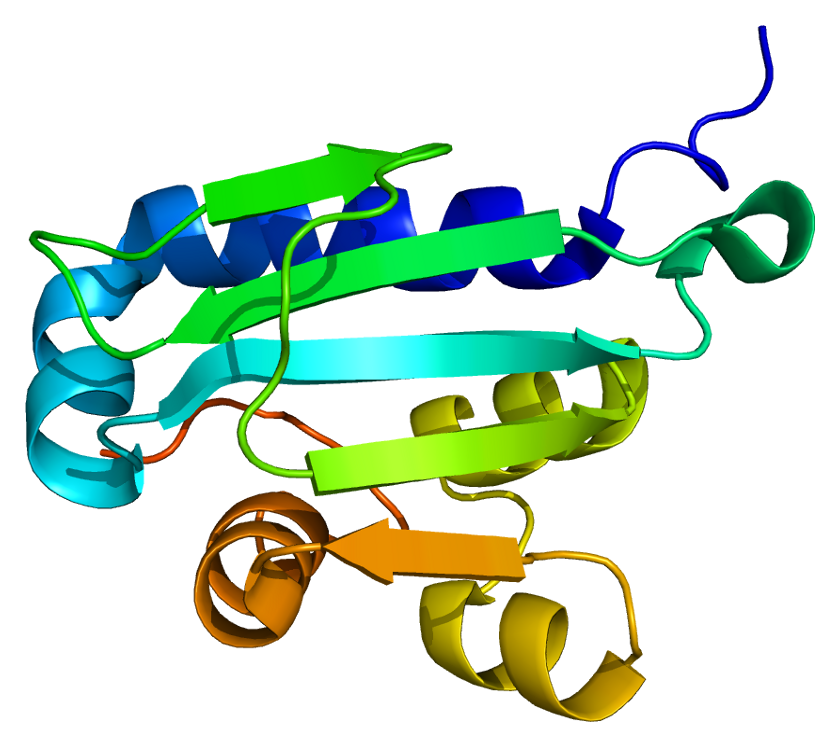

Identifiers
- Aliases: SCP2, NLTP, NSL-TP, SCP-2, SCP-CHI, SCP-X, SCPX, sterol carrier protein 2, SCOX
- External IDs: OMIM: 184755; MGI: 98254; GeneCards: SCP2
Available structures
PDB	Ortholog search: PDBe RCSB
PDB	List of PDB id codes 1QND, 2C0L
Enzyme activity
EC #	BRENDA	ExPASy	KEGG	MetaCyc
2.3.1.16	↗	↗	↗	↗
2.3.1.155	↗	↗	↗	↗
2.3.1.176	↗	↗	↗	↗

Gene location (Human)
Chr.	Chromosome 1 (human)
Band	1p32.3	Start	52,927,276 bp
Band	1p32.3	End	53,051,698 bp

Gene location (Mouse)
Chr.	Chromosome 4 (mouse)
Band	4 C7|4 50.2 cM	Start	107,901,036 bp
Band	4 C7|4 50.2 cM	End	108,002,195 bp
RNA expression pattern
Bgee	Human / Mouse (ortholog); Top expressed in: jejunal mucosa; right lobe of liver; palpebral conjunctiva; germinal epithelium; duodenum; rectum; epithelium of nasopharynx; mucosa of sigmoid colon; gallbladder; pylorus / Top expressed in: proximal tubule; right kidney; white adipose tissue; hepatobiliary system; liver; jejunum; granulocyte; duodenum; human kidney; colon; More reference expression data
BioGPS	n/a
Gene ontology
Molecular function	transferase activity; phosphatidylinositol transfer activity; fatty-acyl-CoA binding; acyltransferase activity, transferring groups other than amino-acyl groups; sterol transporter activity; oleic acid binding; long-chain fatty acyl-CoA binding; cholesterol binding; protein binding; propanoyl-CoA C-acyltransferase activity; catalytic activity; signaling receptor binding; acyltransferase activity; lipid binding; propionyl-CoA C2-trimethyltridecanoyltransferase activity
Cellular component	membrane; intracellular membrane-bounded organelle; peroxisome; nucleoplasm; peroxisomal matrix; mitochondrion; extracellular exosome; cytoplasm; cytosol; protein-containing complex
Biological process	progesterone biosynthetic process; peroxisome organization; lipid transport; inositol trisphosphate biosynthetic process; alpha-linolenic acid metabolic process; positive regulation of steroid metabolic process; lipid hydroperoxide transport; positive regulation of intracellular cholesterol transport; fatty acid beta-oxidation using acyl-CoA oxidase; metabolism; protein localization to plasma membrane; bile acid biosynthetic process; sterol transport; steroid biosynthetic process; phospholipid transport; transport; protein targeting to peroxisome
Sources:Amigo / QuickGO
Orthologs
Databases	NCBI: entry; OMA: entry
Species	Human	Mouse
Entrez	6342	20280
Ensembl	ENSG00000116171	ENSMUSG00000028603
UniProt	P22307	P32020
RefSeq (mRNA)	NM_001007098; NM_001007099; NM_001007100; NM_001007250; NM_001193599 NM_001193600; NM_001193617; NM_002979; NM_001330587	NM_011327
RefSeq (protein)	NP_001007099; NP_001007100; NP_001007101; NP_001007251; NP_001180528 NP_001180529; NP_001180546; NP_001317516; NP_002970	NP_035457
Location (UCSC)	Chr 1: 52.93 – 53.05 Mb	Chr 4: 107.9 – 108 Mb
PubMed search
- Wikidata
View/Edit Human	View/Edit Mouse

Non-specific lipid-transfer protein also known as sterol carrier protein 2 (SCP-2) or propanoyl-CoA C-acyltransferase is a protein that in humans is encoded by the SCP2 gene.

== Function ==
This gene encodes two proteins: sterol carrier protein X (SCPx) and sterol carrier protein 2 (SCP2), as a result of transcription initiation from 2 independently regulated promoters. The transcript initiated from the proximal promoter encodes the longer SCPx protein, and the transcript initiated from the distal promoter encodes the shorter SCP2 protein, with the 2 proteins sharing a common C-terminus. Evidence suggests that the SCPx protein is a peroxisome-associated thiolase that is involved in the oxidation of branched chain fatty acids, while the SCP2 protein is thought to be an intracellular lipid transfer protein. Alternative splicing of this gene produces multiple transcript variants, some encoding different isoforms. The full-length nature of all transcript variants has not been determined.

== Clinical significance ==
This gene is highly expressed in organs involved in lipid metabolism, and may play a role in Zellweger syndrome, in which cells are deficient in peroxisomes and have impaired bile acid synthesis.

== Interactions ==
SCP2 has been shown to interact with Caveolin 1 and peroxisomal receptor PEX5.
