= ACADSB =

Protein-coding gene in the species Homo sapiens

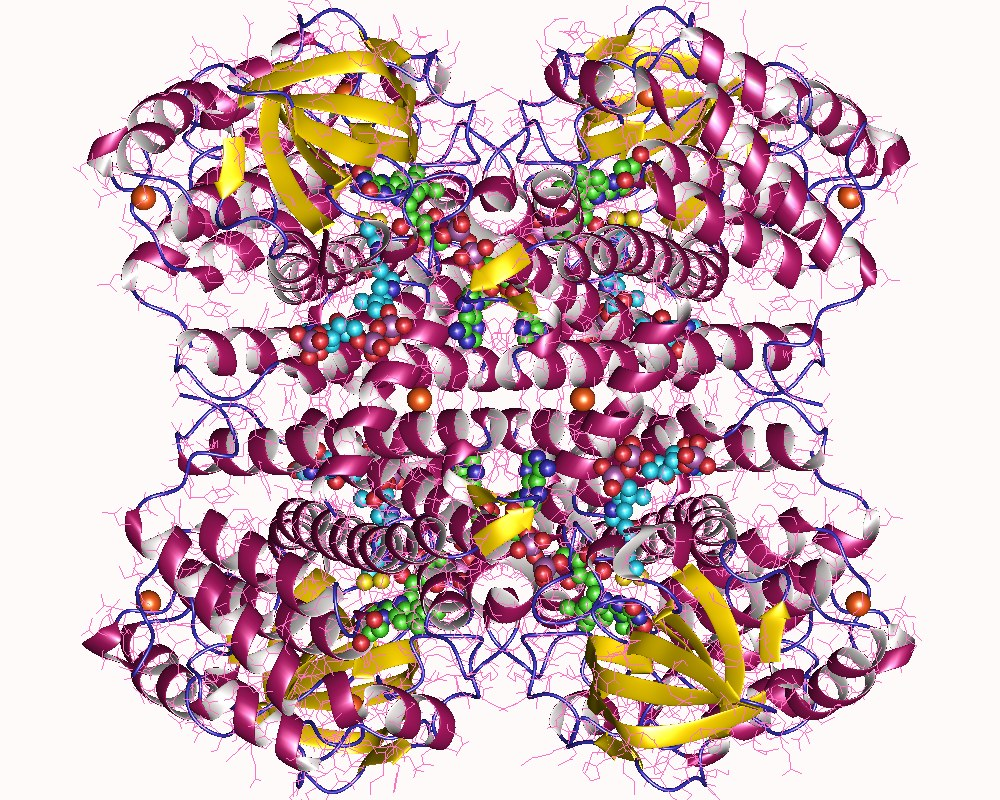

Identifiers
- Aliases: ACADSB, acyl-CoA dehydrogenase, short/branched chain, 2-MEBCAD, ACAD7, SBCAD, acyl-CoA dehydrogenase short/branched chain
- External IDs: OMIM: 600301; MGI: 1914135; GeneCards: ACADSB
Available structures
PDB	Ortholog search: PDBe RCSB
PDB	List of PDB id codes 2JIF
Enzyme activity
EC #	BRENDA	ExPASy	KEGG	MetaCyc
1.3.8.1	↗	↗	↗	↗
1.3.8.5	↗	↗	↗	↗

Gene location (Human)
Chr.	Chromosome 10 (human)
Band	10q26.13	Start	123,008,979 bp
Band	10q26.13	End	123,058,290 bp

Gene location (Mouse)
Chr.	Chromosome 7 (mouse)
Band	7|7 F3	Start	131,012,330 bp
Band	7|7 F3	End	131,050,673 bp
RNA expression pattern
Bgee	Human / Mouse (ortholog); Top expressed in: right lobe of liver; biceps brachii; renal medulla; right ventricle; duodenum; Skeletal muscle tissue of biceps brachii; Skeletal muscle tissue of rectus abdominis; jejunal mucosa; human kidney; gastrocnemius muscle / Top expressed in: muscle of thigh; epithelium of stomach; Epithelium of choroid plexus; right kidney; parotid gland; brown adipose tissue; seminal vesicula; masseter muscle; ciliary body; white adipose tissue; More reference expression data
BioGPS	n/a
Gene ontology
Molecular function	oxidoreductase activity, acting on the CH-CH group of donors; oxidoreductase activity; acyl-CoA dehydrogenase activity; flavin adenine dinucleotide binding
Cellular component	mitochondrial matrix; mitochondrion
Biological process	branched-chain amino acid catabolic process; fatty acid metabolic process; lipid metabolism
Sources:Amigo / QuickGO
Orthologs
Databases	NCBI: entry; OMA: entry
Species	Human	Mouse
Entrez	36	66885
Ensembl	ENSG00000196177	ENSMUSG00000030861
UniProt	P45954	Q9DBL1
RefSeq (mRNA)	NM_001609; NM_001330174	NM_025826
RefSeq (protein)	NP_001317103; NP_001600	NP_080102
Location (UCSC)	Chr 10: 123.01 – 123.06 Mb	Chr 7: 131.01 – 131.05 Mb
PubMed search
- Wikidata
View/Edit Human	View/Edit Mouse

ACADSB is a human gene that encodes short/branched chain specific acyl-CoA dehydrogenase (SBCAD), an enzyme in the acyl CoA dehydrogenase family.

It can cause short/branched-chain acyl-CoA dehydrogenase deficiency.

== Structure ==
The human ACADSB gene is located on chromosome 10; its exact localization has been identified as 10q25-q26. The open reading frame (ORF) encodes a precursor protein that contains 431 amino acids; post-translational processing results in a mature protein with 399 amino acids. The cDNA is significantly similar to the cDNA of other members of the acyl-CoA dehydrogenase family; its structure is closest to that of short chain acyl-CoA dehydrogenase. The structure of the catalytic pocket has also been studied; position 104 at the bottom of the substrate-binding pocket has been identified as important in determining the length of the primary carbon chain that can be accommodated. Altering residues at positions 105 and 177 have been demonstrated to affect the rate of the dehydrogenation reactions.

== Function ==
Short/branched chain acyl-CoA dehydrogenase (ACADSB) is a member of the acyl-CoA dehydrogenase family of enzymes that catalyze the dehydrogenation of acyl-CoA derivatives in the metabolism of fatty acids or branch chained amino acids. Substrate specificity is the primary characteristic used to define members of this gene family. The ACADSB gene product has the greatest activity towards the short branched chain acyl-CoA derivative, (S)-2-methylbutyryl-CoA, but also reacts significantly with other 2-methyl branched chain substrates and with short straight chain acyl-CoAs. The encoded protein is also involved in L-leucine catabolism.

== Clinical significance ==
Mutations in the ACADSB gene have been associated with 2-Methylbutyryl-CoA dehydrogenase deficiency (SBCADD, also known as MBD) deficiency, an autosomal recessive metabolic disorder of impaired isoleucine degradation. Many mutations across the gene's 10 exons have been identified, with the mutations causing exon skipping and other transcriptional and translational errors. The disorder may be detected by MS/MS-based routine newborn screening due to the heightened presence of 2-methylbutyrylcarnitine in tissue samples. The disorder may also be identified using urinary organic acid analysis, by detecting the presence of 2-methylbutyryl glycinuria. While many individuals with a mutation in this gene may be asymptomatic, some patients have been reported to have symptoms in early infancy. Infants may experience apneic episodes, generalized muscle atrophy, hypotonia, lethargy, seizures, and delayed motor development. Patients may also experience metabolic symptoms such as hypothermia and hypoglycemia. Finally, genetic polymorphisms of the ACADSB gene may also be involved in the development of hypertension in the Japanese population.
