= Choloyl-CoA hydrolase =

Class of enzymes

Identifiers
- EC no.: 3.1.2.27

Databases
- BRENDA: enzyme data
- ExPASy: NiceZyme view
- KEGG: enzyme entry
- MetaCyc: metabolic pathway
- Rhea: reactions
- PDB structures: RCSB PDB PDBe PDBsum
Search
- PMC: articles
- PubMed: articles
- NCBI: proteins

The enzyme choloyl-CoA hydrolase (EC 3.1.2.27) catalyzes the reaction

choloyl-CoA
H_{2}O
cholic acid
+ coenzyme A

The enzyme characterised from human liver hydrolyses choloyl-CoA to the bile acid, cholic acid, and coenzyme A which form the thioester in the starting material. This reaction regulates the level of coenzyme A in the peroxisome.

This enzyme is a hydrolase, specifically one acting on thioester bonds. The systematic name is choloyl-CoA hydrolase. Other names in common use include PTE-2 (ambiguous), choloyl-coenzyme A thioesterase, chenodeoxycholoyl-coenzyme A thioesterase, and peroxisomal acyl-CoA thioesterase 2.
