= STOML1 =

Protein-coding gene in the species Homo sapiens

Identifiers
- Aliases: STOML1, SLP-1, STORP, hUNC-24, stomatin like 1
- External IDs: OMIM: 608326; MGI: 1916356; GeneCards: STOML1

Gene location (Human)
Chr.	Chromosome 15 (human)
Band	15q24.1	Start	73,978,926 bp
Band	15q24.1	End	73,994,622 bp

Gene location (Mouse)
Chr.	Chromosome 9 (mouse)
Band	9|9 B	Start	58,160,447 bp
Band	9|9 B	End	58,169,803 bp
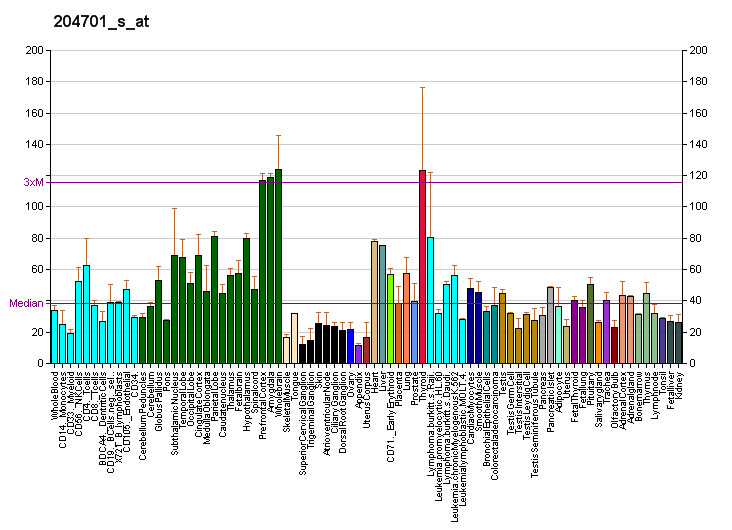

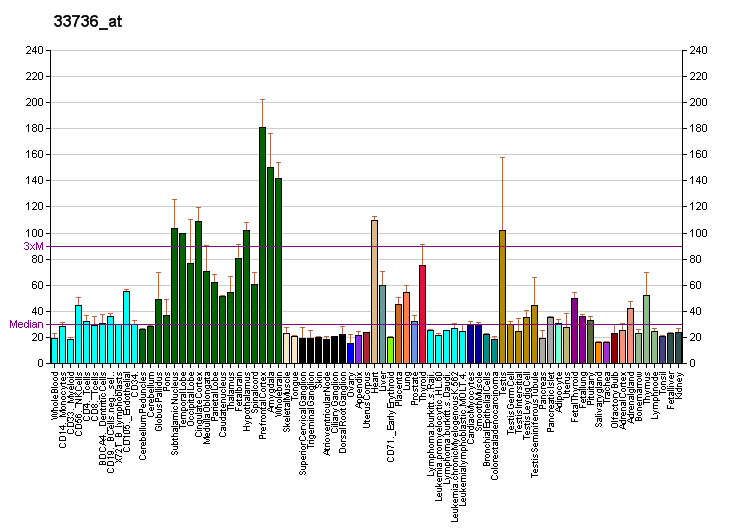
RNA expression pattern
Bgee	Human / Mouse (ortholog); Top expressed in: pancreatic ductal cell; endothelial cell; tendon of biceps brachii; frontal pole; prefrontal cortex; superior vestibular nucleus; Brodmann area 9; Brodmann area 23; right frontal lobe; cingulate gyrus / Top expressed in: dentate gyrus of hippocampal formation granule cell; visual cortex; primary visual cortex; spinal ganglia; neural layer of retina; lumbar spinal ganglion; superior frontal gyrus; neural tube; otolith organ; utricle; More reference expression data
BioGPS	More reference expression data
Gene ontology
Molecular function	protein binding; molecular function
Cellular component	integral component of membrane; membrane; endosome; plasma membrane; cytoplasmic vesicle; late endosome membrane; membrane raft; cellular component
Biological process	lipid transport; biological process
Sources:Amigo / QuickGO
Orthologs
Databases	NCBI: entry; OMA: entry
Species	Human	Mouse
Entrez	9399	69106
Ensembl	ENSG00000067221	ENSMUSG00000032333
UniProt	Q9UBI4	Q8CI66
RefSeq (mRNA)	NM_001256672; NM_001256673; NM_001256674; NM_001256675; NM_001256676 NM_001256677; NM_004809; NM_001324226; NM_001324227; NM_001324228; NM_001324229; NM_001324230	NM_026942
RefSeq (protein)	NP_001243601; NP_001243602; NP_001243603; NP_001243604; NP_001243605 NP_001243606; NP_001311155; NP_001311156; NP_001311157; NP_001311158; NP_001311159; NP_004800	NP_081218
Location (UCSC)	Chr 15: 73.98 – 73.99 Mb	Chr 9: 58.16 – 58.17 Mb
PubMed search
- Wikidata
View/Edit Human	View/Edit Mouse

Stomatin-like protein 1 is a protein that in humans is encoded by the STOML1 gene.
