= Beta-ketothiolase deficiency =

- Other names: 3-oxothiolase deficiency, Mitochondrial acetoacetyl-coenzyme A thiolase deficiency, Alpha-methyl-acetoacetyl-CoA thiolase deficiency
- Isoleucine

Beta-ketothiolase deficiency is a rare, autosomal recessive metabolic disorder in which the body cannot properly process the amino acid isoleucine or the products of lipid breakdown. Along with SCOT deficiency, it belongs to a group of disorders called ketone utilisation disorders.

The typical age of onset for this disorder is between 6 months and 24 months.

== Symptoms and signs ==
The signs and symptoms of beta-ketothiolase deficiency include vomiting, dehydration, trouble breathing, extreme tiredness, and occasionally convulsions. These episodes are called ketoacidotic attacks and can sometimes lead to coma. Attacks occur when compounds called organic acids (which are formed as products of amino acid and fat breakdown) build up to toxic levels in the blood. These attacks are often triggered by an infection, fasting (not eating), or in some cases, other types of stress.

== Genetic ==
Beta-ketothiolase deficiency is autosomal recessive

This condition is inherited in an autosomal recessive pattern and is extremely rare having been reported in medical literature in fewer than 250 individuals throughout the world.

Mutations in the ACAT1 gene cause beta-ketothiolase deficiency. The enzyme made by the ACAT1 gene plays an essential role in breaking down proteins and fats in the diet. Specifically, the enzyme is responsible for processing isoleucine, an amino acid that is part of many proteins. This enzyme also processes ketones, which are produced during the breakdown of fats. If a mutation in the ACAT1 gene reduces or eliminates the activity of this enzyme, the body is unable to process isoleucine and ketones properly. As a result, harmful compounds can build up and cause the blood to become too acidic (ketoacidosis), which impairs tissue function, especially in the central nervous system.

== Diagnosis ==
In beta-ketothiolase deficiency, alpha-methyl-beta-keto-butyrate, alpha-methyl-beta-OH-butyrate and tiglyl glycine (upstream metabolites of the affected enzyme) may accumulate and may be detected on urine organic acid analysis by GC-MS. This may aid in the diagnosis, but for a more definitive diagnosis genetic confirmation needs to be done.

== Treatment ==
During a ketoacidotic crisis, intravenous fluids with glucose and electrolytes should be administered immediately. Bicarbonate (initially as 1 mmol/kg over 10 minutes followed by continuous infusion) should be given to treat acidosis. Carnitine supplementation may be helpful. Dialysis is effective but usually not necessary. Unconscious patients and those with severe dyspnea may require mechanical ventilation. Long-term management involves avoidance of fasting (and intravenous glucose in cases of fever or vomiting) and, in children, a mildly restricted protein intake (1.5-2g/kg/day), avoidance of fat-rich (ketogenic) diet, and L-carnitine therapy in those with low carnitine levels. Avoidance of isoleucine overload might prevent neurological complications, but currently there is no evidence to support this
