= Acetyl-CoA C-acetyltransferase =

Class of enzymes

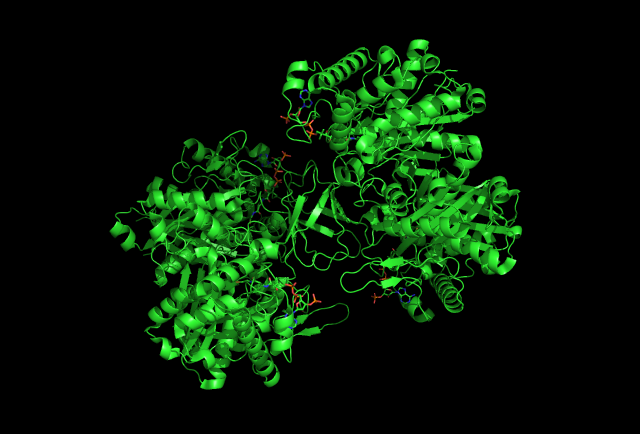
- Crystallographic structure of the tetrameric acetoacetyl-CoA thiolase (EC:2.3.1.9) from the Gram-negative bacterium Z. ramigera.

Identifiers
- EC no.: 2.3.1.9
- CAS no.: 9027-46-7

Databases
- IntEnz: IntEnz view
- BRENDA: BRENDA entry
- ExPASy: NiceZyme view
- KEGG: KEGG entry
- MetaCyc: metabolic pathway
- PRIAM: profile
- PDB structures: RCSB PDB PDBe PDBsum
- Gene Ontology: AmiGO / QuickGO
Search
- PMC: articles
- PubMed: articles
- NCBI: proteins

Acetyl-CoA C-acetyltransferase (EC 2.3.1.9) is an enzyme that catalyzes the chemical reaction

2
acetyl-CoA
acetoacetyl-CoA
+ coenzyme A

The enzyme has one substrate, acetyl-CoA, and converts two molecules of this into acetoacetyl-CoA and coenzyme A.

Acetyl-CoA C-acetyltransferase has a cysteine at its active site, and is a transferase in the group of acyltransferases which transfer groups other than aminoacyl groups. Its systematic name is acetyl-CoA:acetyl-CoA C-acetyltransferase. Other names in common use include acetoacetyl-CoA thiolase, beta-acetoacetyl coenzyme A thiolase, 2-methylacetoacetyl-CoA thiolase [misleading], 3-oxothiolase, acetyl coenzyme A thiolase, acetyl-CoA acetyltransferase, acetyl-CoA:N-acetyltransferase, and thiolase II. This enzyme participates in many metabolic pathways including fatty acid metabolism, synthesis and degradation of ketone bodies, valine, leucine and isoleucine degradation, lysine degradation, tryptophan metabolism, pyruvate metabolism, propanoate metabolism, and butanoate metabolism.

== Isozymes ==
Human genes encoding acetyl-CoA C-acetyltransferases include:

acetyl-Coenzyme A acetyltransferase 1 (acetoacetyl Coenzyme A Thiolase)

Identifiers
- Symbol: ACAT1
- NCBI gene: 38
- HGNC: 93
- OMIM: 607809
- RefSeq: NM_000019
- UniProt: P24752

Other data
- EC number: 2.3.1.9
- Locus: Chr. 11 q22.3-23.1
Search for
- Structures: Swiss-model
- Domains: InterPro

acetyl-Coenzyme A acetyltransferase 2 (acetoacetyl Coenzyme A thiolase)

Identifiers
- Symbol: ACAT2
- NCBI gene: 39
- HGNC: 94
- OMIM: 100678
- RefSeq: NM_005891
- UniProt: Q9BWD1

Other data
- EC number: 2.3.1.9
- Locus: Chr. 6 q25.3-q26
Search for
- Structures: Swiss-model
- Domains: InterPro
