= ACADL =

Protein-coding gene in humans

Identifiers
- Aliases: ACADL, acyl-CoA dehydrogenase, long chain, ACAD4, LCAD, acyl-CoA dehydrogenase long chain
- External IDs: OMIM: 609576; MGI: 87866; GeneCards: ACADL
Enzyme activity
EC #	BRENDA	ExPASy	KEGG	MetaCyc
1.3.8.7	↗	↗	↗	↗
1.3.8.8	↗	↗	↗	↗

Gene location (Human)
Chr.	Chromosome 2 (human)
Band	2q34	Start	210,187,126 bp
Band	2q34	End	210,225,447 bp

Gene location (Mouse)
Chr.	Chromosome 1 (mouse)
Band	1 C3|1 33.64 cM	Start	66,869,998 bp
Band	1 C3|1 33.64 cM	End	66,902,436 bp
RNA expression pattern
Bgee	Human / Mouse (ortholog); Top expressed in: body of pancreas; popliteal artery; tibial arteries; Descending thoracic aorta; right lobe of thyroid gland; left lobe of thyroid gland; tibial nerve; ascending aorta; Achilles tendon; left coronary artery / Top expressed in: right ventricle; myocardium of ventricle; cardiac muscles; tunica adventitia of aorta; digastric muscle; intercostal muscle; cardiac muscle tissue of left ventricle; sternocleidomastoid muscle; transitional epithelium of urinary bladder; brown adipose tissue; More reference expression data
BioGPS	n/a
Gene ontology
Molecular function	oxidoreductase activity, acting on the CH-CH group of donors; acyl-CoA dehydrogenase activity; long-chain-acyl-CoA dehydrogenase activity; oxidoreductase activity; fatty-acyl-CoA binding; palmitoyl-CoA oxidase activity; flavin adenine dinucleotide binding
Cellular component	mitochondrial membranes; mitochondrial matrix; mitochondrion
Biological process	cellular lipid catabolic process; negative regulation of fatty acid biosynthetic process; lipid metabolism; negative regulation of fatty acid oxidation; fatty acid metabolic process; regulation of cholesterol metabolic process; fatty acid beta-oxidation; temperature homeostasis; protein homotetramerization; carnitine catabolic process; carnitine metabolic process, CoA-linked; fatty acid beta-oxidation using acyl-CoA dehydrogenase; long-chain fatty acid catabolic process; positive regulation of cold-induced thermogenesis
Sources:Amigo / QuickGO
Orthologs
Databases	NCBI: entry; OMA: entry
Species	Human	Mouse
Entrez	33	11363
Ensembl	ENSG00000115361	ENSMUSG00000026003
UniProt	P28330	P51174
RefSeq (mRNA)	NM_001608	NM_007381
RefSeq (protein)	NP_001599	NP_031407
Location (UCSC)	Chr 2: 210.19 – 210.23 Mb	Chr 1: 66.87 – 66.9 Mb
PubMed search
- Wikidata
View/Edit Human	View/Edit Mouse

Acyl-CoA dehydrogenase, long chain is a protein that in humans is encoded by the ACADL gene.

ACADL is a gene that encodes LCAD—acyl-CoA dehydrogenase, long chain—which is a member of the acyl-CoA dehydrogenase family. The acyl-CoA dehydrogenase family is primarily responsible for beta-oxidation of fatty acids within the mitochondria. LCAD dysfunction is associated with lowered fatty acid oxidation capacity and decreased heat generation. As a result, LCAD deficiency has been correlated with increased cardiac hypertrophy, pulmonary disease, and overall insulin resistance.

== Structure ==
Acadl is a single-copy, nuclear encoded gene approximately 35 kb in size. The gene contains 11 coding exons ranging in size from 67 bp to 275 bp, interrupted by 10 introns ranging in size from 1.0 kb to 6.6 kb in size. The Acadl 5' regulatory region, like other members of the Acad family, lacks a TATA or CAAT box and is GC rich. This region does contain multiple, putative cis-acting DNA elements recognized by either SP1 or members of the steroid-thyroid family of nuclear receptors, which has been shown with other members of the ACAD gene family to be important in regulated expression.

== Function ==
The LCAD enzyme catalyzes most of fatty acid beta-oxidation by forming a C2-C3 trans-double bond in the fatty acid. LCAD works on long-chain fatty acids, typically between C12 and C16-acylCoA. LCAD is essential for oxidizing unsaturated fatty acids such as oleic acid, but seems redundant in the oxidation of saturated fatty acids.

Fatty acid oxidation has proven to spare glucose in fasting conditions, and is also required for amino acid metabolism, which is essential for the maintenance of adequate glucose production. LCAD is regulated by a reversible acetylation mechanism by SIRT3, in which the active form of the enzyme is deacetylated, and hyperacetylation reduces the enzymatic activity. Moreover, LCAD participates in fatty acid metabolism and PPAR signaling pathway.

== Animal studies ==
In mice, LCAD deficient mice have been shown to expend less energy, and are also subject to hypothermia, which can be explained by the fact that a reduced rate of fatty acid oxidation is correlated with a lowered capacity to generate heat. Indeed, when LCAD mice are exposed to the cold, the expression of fatty acid oxidation genes was elevated in liver.

As ACADL is a mitochondrial protein, and a member of the beta-oxidation family, there are many instances in which its deficiency is correlated with mitochondrial dysfunction and the diseases that manifest as a result. The ACADL gene has been correlated with protecting against diabetes. In corroboration, primary defects in mitochondrial fatty acid oxidation capacity, as illustrated by LCAD knockout mice, can lead to diacylglycerol accumulation, otherwise known as steatosis, as well as PKCepsilon activation, and hepatic insulin resistance. In animals with very long-chain acyl-CoA dehydrogenase deficiency, LCAD and MCAD work to compensate for the reduced fatty acid oxidation capacity; this compensation is modest, however, and the fatty acid oxidation levels do not return completely to wild type levels. Additionally, LCAD has been shown to have no mechanism that compensates for its deficiency.

In the heart, LCAD knockout mice rely more heavily on glucose oxidation, concurrently while there is a large need for replenishment of metabolic intermediates, or anaplerosis. During fasting, the increased glucose usage cannot maintain homeostasis in LCAD knockout mice. LCAD knockout mice displayed a higher level of cardiac hypertrophy, as indicated by increased left ventricular wall thickness and an increased amount of metabolic cardiomyopathy. The knockout mice also had increased triglyceride levels in the myocardium, which is a detrimental disease phenotype. Carnitine supplementation did lower the triglyceride levels in these knockout mice, but did not have any effect on hypertrophy or cardiac performance.

The ACADL gene has also been linked to pathophysiology of pulmonary disease. In humans, this protein was shown to be localized to the human alveolar type II pneumocytes, which synthesize and secrete pulmonary surfactant. Mice that were lacking LCAD (-/-) had dysfunctional or reduced amounts of pulmonary surfactant, which is required to prevent infection; the mice who did not have this protein also displayed a significantly reduced lung capacity in a variety of tests.

== Clinical significance ==
As LCAD deficiency has not yet been found in humans, it has also been postulated that LCAD confers a critical role in development of the blastocoele in human embryos.

== See also ==
- Acyl CoA dehydrogenase
