= HADHB =

Protein-coding gene in the species Homo sapiens

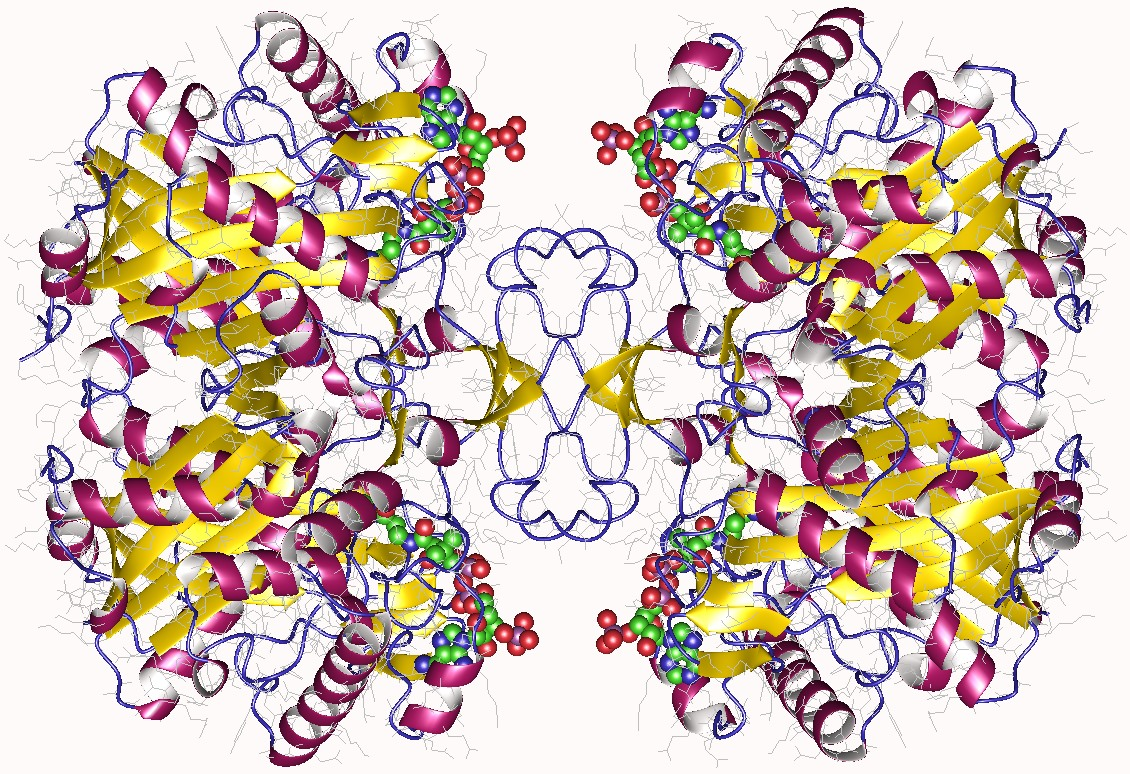

Identifiers
- Aliases: HADHB, ECHB, MSTP029, MTPB, TP-BETA, hydroxyacyl-CoA dehydrogenase/3-ketoacyl-CoA thiolase/enoyl-CoA hydratase (trifunctional protein), beta subunit, hydroxyacyl-CoA dehydrogenase trifunctional multienzyme complex subunit beta
- External IDs: OMIM: 143450; MGI: 2136381; HomoloGene: 153; GeneCards: HADHB; OMA:HADHB - orthologs

Gene location (Human)
Chr.	Chromosome 2 (human)
Band	2p23.3	Start	26,243,170 bp
Band	2p23.3	End	26,290,465 bp

Gene location (Mouse)
Chr.	Chromosome 5 (mouse)
Band	5|5 B1	Start	30,360,246 bp
Band	5|5 B1	End	30,389,591 bp
RNA expression pattern
Bgee	Human / Mouse (ortholog); Top expressed in: right ventricle; myocardium of left ventricle; deltoid muscle; tibialis anterior muscle; jejunal mucosa; gastrocnemius muscle; Skeletal muscle tissue of rectus abdominis; cardiac muscle tissue of right atrium; triceps brachii muscle; quadriceps femoris muscle / Top expressed in: spermatocyte; muscle of thigh; esophagus; right kidney; spermatid; lip; genital tubercle; yolk sac; dentate gyrus of hippocampal formation granule cell; tail of embryo; More reference expression data
BioGPS	n/a
Gene ontology
Molecular function	transferase activity; acyltransferase activity, transferring groups other than amino-acyl groups; enoyl-CoA hydratase activity; long-chain-3-hydroxyacyl-CoA dehydrogenase activity; protein binding; catalytic activity; acyltransferase activity; 3-hydroxyacyl-CoA dehydrogenase activity; RNA binding; acetyl-CoA C-acyltransferase activity; long-chain-enoyl-CoA hydratase activity
Cellular component	membrane; mitochondrial outer membrane; endoplasmic reticulum; mitochondrial inner membrane; mitochondrial envelope; mitochondrial nucleoid; extracellular exosome; mitochondrion
Biological process	lipid metabolism; fatty acid metabolic process; metabolism; cardiolipin acyl-chain remodeling; fatty acid beta-oxidation
Sources:Amigo / QuickGO
Orthologs
Species	Human	Mouse
Entrez	3032	231086
Ensembl	ENSG00000138029	ENSMUSG00000059447
UniProt	P55084	Q99JY0
RefSeq (mRNA)	NM_000183; NM_001281512; NM_001281513	NM_145558; NM_001289798; NM_001289799
RefSeq (protein)	NP_000174; NP_001268441; NP_001268442	NP_001276727; NP_001276728; NP_663533
Location (UCSC)	Chr 2: 26.24 – 26.29 Mb	Chr 5: 30.36 – 30.39 Mb
PubMed search
- Wikidata
View/Edit Human	View/Edit Mouse

Trifunctional enzyme subunit beta, mitochondrial (TP-beta) also known as 3-ketoacyl-CoA thiolase, acetyl-CoA acyltransferase, or beta-ketothiolase is an enzyme that in humans is encoded by the HADHB gene.

HADHB is a subunit of the mitochondrial trifunctional protein and has thiolase activity.

== Structure ==
The HADHB gene is located on chromosome 2, with its specific location being 2p23. The gene contains 17 exons. HADHB encodes a 51.2 kDa protein that is composed of 474 amino acids; 124 peptides have been observed through mass spectrometry data.

== Function ==
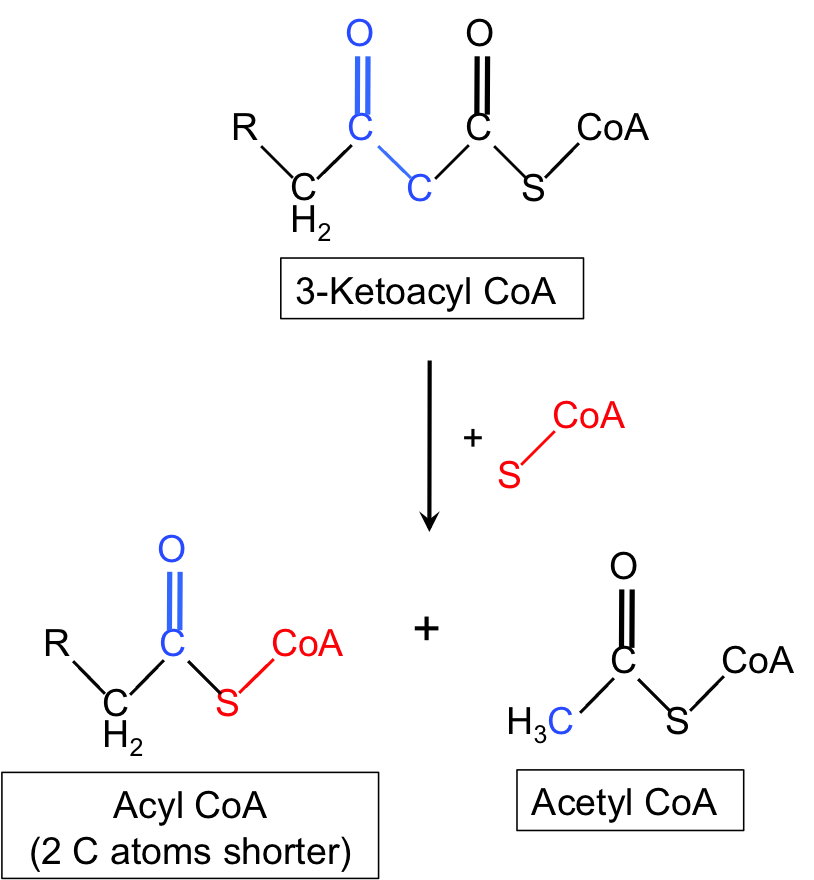
Enzymatic activity of HADHB in beta-oxidation

This gene encodes the beta subunit of the mitochondrial trifunctional protein, a catalyst of mitochondrial beta-oxidation of long chain fatty acids. The HADHB protein catalyzes the final step of beta-oxidation, in which 3-ketoacyl CoA is cleaved by the thiol group of another molecule of Coenzyme A. The thiol is inserted between C-2 and C-3, which yields an acetyl CoA molecule and an acyl CoA molecule, which is two carbons shorter.

The encoded protein can also bind RNA and decreases the stability of some mRNAs. The genes of the alpha and beta subunits of the mitochondrial trifunctional protein are located adjacent to each other in the human genome in a head-to-head orientation.

== Clinical significance ==
Mutations in this gene, along with mutations in HADHA, result in trifunctional protein deficiency. Mutations in either gene have similar clinical presentations. Trifunctional protein deficiency is characterized by decreased activity of long-chain 3-hydroxyacyl-CoA dehydrogenase (LCHAD), long-chain enoyl-CoA hydratase, and long-chain thiolase. This deficiency can be classified into 3 main clinical phenotypes: neonatal onset of a severe, lethal condition resulting in sudden infant death syndrome (SIDS), infantile onset of a hepatic Reye-like syndrome, and late-adolescent onset of primarily a skeletal myopathy. Additionally, some presents showed symptoms associated with myopathy, recurrent and episodic rhabdomyolysis, and sensorimotor axonal neuropathy. In some cases, symptoms of the deficiency can present as dilated cardiomyopathy, congestive heart failure, and respiratory failure. The deficiency has presented as hydrops fetalis and HELLP syndrome in fetuses. A compound heterozygous mutation of the HADHB gene can cause axonal Charcot-Marie-tooth disease, which is a neurological disorder, which shows that mutations in this gene can result in deficiencies that present in new forms not currently described.

== Interactions ==
HADHB is a functional molecular target of ERα in the mitochondria, and the interaction may play an important role in the estrogen-mediated lipid metabolism in animals and humans. Additionally, HADHB has been shown to bind to the distal 3' untranslated region of renin mRNA, thereby regulating renin protein expression. HADHB and cold-inducible RBP (CIRBP) were shown to be regulated after ischemia, positively regulating biogenesis of miR-329 and miR-495.
