= ECSIT =

Protein-coding gene in the species Homo sapiens

Identifiers
- Aliases: ECSIT, SITPEC, ECSIT signalling integrator, ECSIT signaling integrator
- External IDs: OMIM: 608388; MGI: 1349469; GeneCards: ECSIT

Gene location (Human)
Chr.	Chromosome 19 (human)
Band	19p13.2	Start	11,505,929 bp
Band	19p13.2	End	11,529,172 bp

Gene location (Mouse)
Chr.	Chromosome 9 (mouse)
Band	9|9 A3	Start	21,983,542 bp
Band	9|9 A3	End	21,996,734 bp
RNA expression pattern
Bgee	Human / Mouse (ortholog); Top expressed in: apex of heart; left ventricle; gastrocnemius muscle; muscle of thigh; right auricle of heart; mucosa of transverse colon; body of stomach; right frontal lobe; body of pancreas; right lobe of liver / Top expressed in: interventricular septum; muscle of thigh; right kidney; skeletal muscle tissue; temporal muscle; right ventricle; digastric muscle; sternocleidomastoid muscle; extraocular muscle; triceps brachii muscle; More reference expression data
BioGPS	n/a
Gene ontology
Molecular function	oxidoreductase activity, acting on NAD(P)H; protein binding
Cellular component	cytoplasm; mitochondrial inner membrane; mitochondrion; nucleus; nucleoplasm; cytosol
Biological process	immune system process; innate immune response; regulation of oxidoreductase activity; mitochondrial respiratory chain complex I assembly
Sources:Amigo / QuickGO
Orthologs
Databases	NCBI: entry; OMA: entry
Species	Human	Mouse
Entrez	51295	26940
Ensembl	ENSG00000130159	ENSMUSG00000066839
UniProt	Q9BQ95	Q9QZH6
RefSeq (mRNA)	NM_016581; NM_001142464; NM_001142465; NM_001243204	NM_001253897; NM_001253898; NM_012029
RefSeq (protein)	NP_001135936; NP_001135937; NP_001230133; NP_057665	NP_001240826; NP_001240827; NP_036159
Location (UCSC)	Chr 19: 11.51 – 11.53 Mb	Chr 9: 21.98 – 22 Mb
PubMed search
- Wikidata
View/Edit Human	View/Edit Mouse

Evolutionarily conserved signaling intermediate in Toll pathway, mitochondrial (ECSIT), also known as SITPEC, is a protein that in humans is encoded by the ECSIT gene. ECSIT is a cytosolic adaptor protein involved in inflammatory responses, embryonic development, and the assembly and stabilization of mitochondrial NADH:ubiquinone oxidoreductase (complex I).

== Structure ==
ECSIT is located on the p arm of chromosome 19 in position 13.2 and has 9 exons. The ECSIT gene produces a 49 kDa protein composed of 431 amino acids. ECSIT's interactions with p65/p50 NF-κB proteins is dependent on lysine 372 ubiquitination. ECSIT also contains an N-terminal targeting signal that causes it to localize to mitochondria where only the 45 kDa mitochondrial ECSIT is found to interact.

== Function ==
ECSIT has been found to play multiple roles in cell-signaling, including those that utilize Toll-like receptors (TLRs), TGF-β, and BMP. ECSIT plays a regulatory role as part of the TAK1-ECSIT-TRAF6 complex that is involved in the activation of NF-κB by the TLR4 signal and through its interactions with TRIM59 to negatively regulate NF-κB, IRF-3, and IRF-7-mediated signal pathways. Additionally, ECSIT appears to contribute to bactericidal activity in TLR signaling through its interaction with tumor necrosis factor receptor-associated factor 6 (TRAF6). Importantly, ubiquitination of ECSIT has shown itself to be necessary for the activation of p65/p50 NF-κBs in TLR4 signaling. Functioning as a scaffold protein, ECSIT is also essential for the association of RIG-I-like receptors (RIG-I or MDA5) to VISA. The bridging of these receptors to VISA is an important signaling event used in innate antiviral responses. Apart from inflammatory and immune responses, ECSIT, in its 45 kDa, mitochondrial form helps maintain assembly chaperone NDUFAF1's stable presence in the mitochondrion. Through this interaction, ECSIT is demonstrated to play an important role in NADH:ubiquinone oxidoreductase (complex I) assembly and stabilization. Finally, ECSIT is required for normal embryonic development.

== Interactions ==
ECSIT has 136 protein-protein interactions, with 53 of them being co-complex interactions.

In addition to TAK1, TRAF6, TRIM59, RIG-I-like receptors, VISA, and NDUFAF1 interactions, ECSIT can interact with MAP3K1 and SMAD4, and is a part of the mitochondrial complex I assembly (MCIA) complex.[5]
