= NDUFAF1 =

Protein-coding gene in the species Homo sapiens

Identifiers
- Aliases: NDUFAF1, CGI65, CIA30, CGI-65, NADH:ubiquinone oxidoreductase complex assembly factor 1, MC1DN11
- External IDs: OMIM: 606934; MGI: 1916952; HomoloGene: 32289; GeneCards: NDUFAF1; OMA:NDUFAF1 - orthologs

Gene location (Human)
| Chr. | Chromosome 15 (human) |
| Band | 15q15.1 | Start | 41,387,218 bp |
| Band | 15q15.1 | End | 41,409,403 bp |

Gene location (Mouse)
| Chr. | Chromosome 2 (mouse) |
| Band | 2|2 E5 | Start | 119,485,927 bp |
| Band | 2|2 E5 | End | 119,493,308 bp |
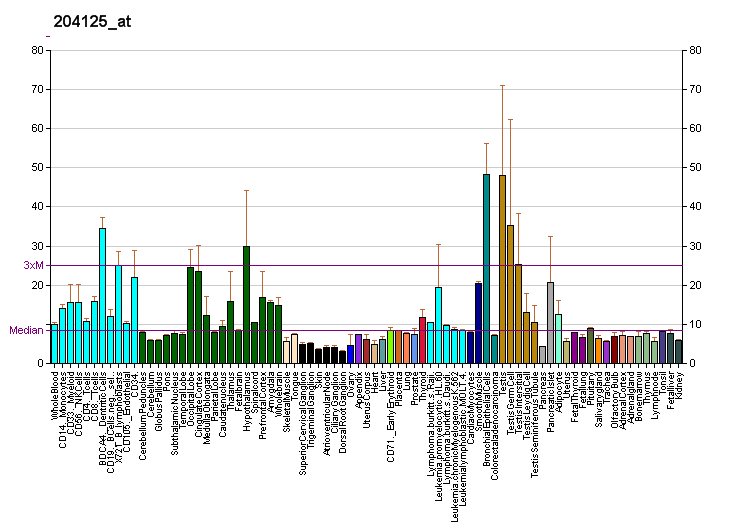
RNA expression pattern
| Bgee | Human / Mouse (ortholog); Top expressed in: apex of heart; gastrocnemius muscle; muscle of thigh; right adrenal gland; right adrenal cortex; right ventricle; left adrenal gland; left ventricle; left adrenal cortex; sperm / Top expressed in: digastric muscle; sternocleidomastoid muscle; temporal muscle; saccule; soleus muscle; myocardium of ventricle; interventricular septum; otic vesicle; vastus lateralis muscle; triceps brachii muscle; More reference expression data |
| BioGPS | More reference expression data |
Gene ontology
| Molecular function | unfolded protein binding; protein binding |
| Cellular component | mitochondrial inner membrane; mitochondrial respiratory chain complex I; mitochondrion; cytosol; mitochondrial matrix |
| Biological process | mitochondrial electron transport, NADH to ubiquinone; mitochondrial respiratory chain complex I assembly; protein-containing complex assembly |
Sources:Amigo / QuickGO
Orthologs
| Species | Human | Mouse |
| Entrez | 51103 | 69702 |
| Ensembl | ENSG00000137806 | ENSMUSG00000027305 |
| UniProt | Q9Y375 | Q9CWX2 |
| RefSeq (mRNA) | NM_016013 | NM_027175; NM_001356467 |
| RefSeq (protein) | NP_057097 | NP_081451; NP_001343396; NP_001393427; NP_001393428; NP_001393429 NP_001393430; NP_001393431; NP_001393432 |
| Location (UCSC) | Chr 15: 41.39 – 41.41 Mb | Chr 2: 119.49 – 119.49 Mb |
| PubMed search |
- Wikidata
| View/Edit Human | View/Edit Mouse |

Complex I intermediate-associated protein 30, mitochondrial (CIA30), or NADH dehydrogenase [ubiquinone] 1 alpha subcomplex assembly factor 1 (NDUFAF1), is a protein that in humans is encoded by the NDUFAF1 or CIA30 gene. The NDUFAF1 gene encodes a human homolog of a Neurospora crassa protein involved in the assembly of complex I. The NDUFAF1 protein is an assembly factor of NADH dehydrogenase (ubiquinone) also known as complex I, which is located in the mitochondrial inner membrane and is the largest of the five complexes of the electron transport chain. Variants of the NDUFAF1 gene are associated with hypertrophic cardiomyopathy, leukodystrophy, and cardioencephalomyopathy.

== Structure ==
NDUFAF1 is located on the q arm of chromosome 15 in position 15.1. The NDUFAF1 gene produces a 37.8 kDa protein composed of 327 amino acids. NDUFAF1 is associated to complexes of 600 and 700 kDa. Complex I is structured in a bipartite L-shaped configuration, which is made up of a peripheral matrix arm, consisting of flavoproteins and iron-sulfur proteins involved in electron transfer, and a membrane arm, consisting of mtDNA-encoded subunits involved in ubiquinone reduction and proton pumping. NDUFAF1 has been shown to interact with assembly intermediates and may play roles in the correct assembly and combination of the peripheral arm to the complete membrane arm as well as in the stabilization and scaffolding of those intermediates through those close interactions.

== Function ==
NDUFAF1 is an assembly factor that is important for the correct assembly of NADH dehydrogenase (ubiquinone). It ensures the correct combination of complex intermediates and is necessary for the correct functioning of NADH dehydrogenase (ubiquinone). Specifically, NDUFAF1 binds to the large membrane arm intermediate and is involved in the combination of the small and large membrane arm intermediates of complex I. It has also been suggested that NDUFAF1 is involved in the stabilization and scaffolding of assembly intermediates and that this role may be more prominent than its part in intermediate combination.

== Clinical significance ==
Mutations in NDUFAF1 can result in mitochondrial deficiencies and associated disorders. A disorder of the mitochondrial respiratory chain can cause a wide range of clinical manifestations from lethal neonatal disease to adult-onset neurodegenerative disorders. Phenotypes include macrocephaly with progressive leukodystrophy, non-specific encephalopathy, cardiomyopathy, myopathy, liver disease, Leigh syndrome, Leber hereditary optic neuropathy, and some forms of Parkinson disease.

In a patient with missense mutations in NDUFAF1, fatal infantile hypertrophic cardiomyopathy was diagnosed. In this case, complex I disassembly resulted in a mitochondrial cardiomyopathy with marked lactic acidosis. Another patient, a child with a compound heterozygous mutation (c.278A > G; c.247G > A) within exon 2 in the NDUFAF1 gene, was diagnosed with leukodystrophy associated with mitochondrial complex I deficiency. Signs and symptoms included regression of mental and motor development, white matter lesions, peripheral neuropathy with high muscle tension and hyperreflexia of limbs, and high levels of lactate and creatine kinase. The parents were found to be heterozygous carriers for the mutation. A third patient was found to have a mutation in both alleles of the NDUFAF1 gene and was diagnosed with cardioencephalomyopathy and reduced levels and activity of complex I.

== Interactions ==
In addition to co-complexes, NDUFAF1 has protein-protein interactions with PNLIPRP1, TMEM97, TMEM86B, YIPF6, SLC30A2, ATIC, and MAGEA11.
