= ATP5MK =

Protein-coding gene in the humans

Identifiers
- Aliases: ATP5MK, DAPIT, HCVFTP2, bA792D24.4, up-regulated during skeletal muscle growth 5 homolog (mouse), USMG5, ATP synthase membrane subunit DAPIT, MC5DN6, AGP, ATP5MD, ATP synthase membrane subunit k
- External IDs: OMIM: 615204; MGI: 1891435; GeneCards: ATP5MK

Gene location (Human)
Chr.	Chromosome 10 (human)
Band	10q24.33	Start	103,389,041 bp
Band	10q24.33	End	103,396,492 bp

Gene location (Mouse)
Chr.	Chromosome 19 (mouse)
Band	19|19 C3	Start	47,071,903 bp
Band	19|19 C3	End	47,079,086 bp
RNA expression pattern
Bgee	Human / Mouse (ortholog); Top expressed in: quadriceps femoris muscle; left ventricle; primary visual cortex; superior frontal gyrus; Brodmann area 9; right auricle of heart; prefrontal cortex; amygdala; nucleus accumbens; right frontal lobe / Top expressed in: right kidney; intercostal muscle; facial motor nucleus; yolk sac; extraocular muscle; digastric muscle; atrioventricular valve; myocardium of ventricle; endocardial cushion; superior frontal gyrus; More reference expression data
BioGPS	n/a
Orthologs
Databases	NCBI: entry; OMA: entry
Species	Human	Mouse
Entrez	84833	66477
Ensembl	ENSG00000173915	ENSMUSG00000071528
UniProt	Q96IX5	Q78IK2
RefSeq (mRNA)	NM_032747; NM_001206426; NM_001206427	NM_023211
RefSeq (protein)	NP_001193355; NP_001193356; NP_116136	NP_075700
Location (UCSC)	Chr 10: 103.39 – 103.4 Mb	Chr 19: 47.07 – 47.08 Mb
PubMed search
- Wikidata
View/Edit Human	View/Edit Mouse

ATP synthase membrane subunit k (or ATP5MK) is a protein that in humans is encoded by the ATP5MK gene (previously USMG5).

== Structure ==
The USMG5 gene is located on the q arm of chromosome 10 at position 24.33 and it spans 7,463 base pairs. The USMG5 gene produces a 6.46 kDa protein composed of 58 amino acids. USMG5 is a small subunit of the mitochondrial ATP synthase (complex V), as well as the lysosomal V-ATPase. The protein is associated with the ATP synthase in a stoichiometric manner. The structure of the protein contains a putative transmembrane segment and a single presumed α-helix that spans from amino acid 23 to 45. The structure has been found to be similar to its putative yeast ortholog.

== Function ==
The human USMG5 gene codes for a protein with a role in maintaining and regulating the ATP synthase population in the mitochondria. The protein is responsible for several minor roles that are expendable for the core function of complex V. A knockdown of the protein has been shown to lead to reduced ATP synthesis rate and CV dimer expression, while the wild type has been shown to boost the dimerization of complex V as well as enhance the ATP synthesis rate.

== Clinical Significance ==
Mutations in USMG5 has been found to result in mitochondrial deficiencies and associated disorders of the mitochondrial ATP synthase (complex V). Homozygous splice-site mutations (c.87 + 1G>C) in the Ashkenazi Jewish population have been associated with cases of leigh syndrome caused by the decrease of Complex V dimerization and ATP synthesis. Leigh syndrome is a heterogeneous mitochondrial oxidative phosphorylation (OXPHOS) disease that is characterized by psychomotor retardation and necrotizing lesions in the brain.

== Interactions ==
USMG5 is a component of the ATP synthase complex, and has co-complex interactions with ATP5F1, ATP5MC1, TP5F1E, ATP5PD, ATP5ME, ATP5PF, ATP5MF, and others.
