= ATP synthase subunit C =

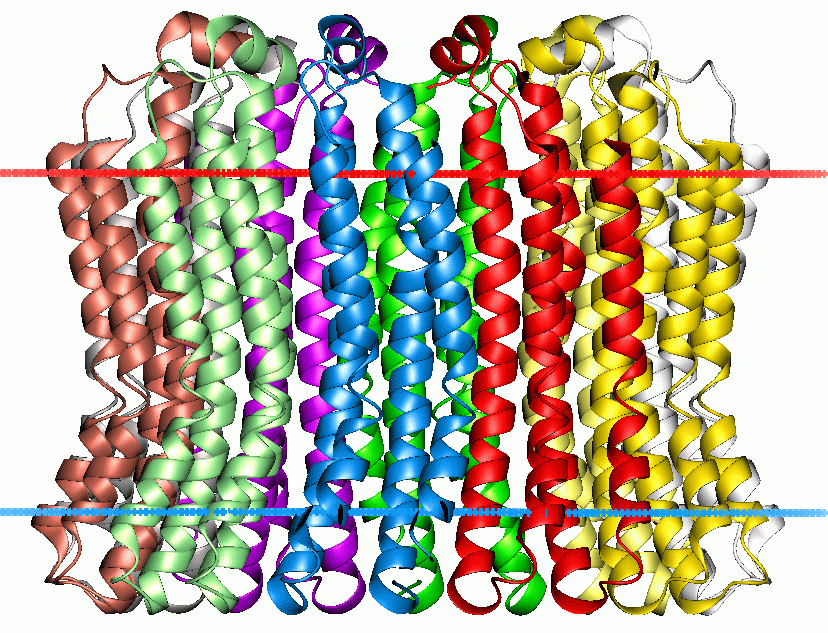
- V-type sodium ATPase from Enterococcus hirae. Calculated hydrocarbon boundaries of the lipid bilayer are shown by red and blue dots

Identifiers
- Symbol: ATP-synt_C
- Pfam: PF00137
- InterPro: IPR002379
- PROSITE: PDOC00526
- SCOP2: 1aty / SCOPe / SUPFAM
- OPM superfamily: 5
- OPM protein: 2bl2
Available protein structures:
- PDB: IPR002379 PF00137 (ECOD; PDBsum)
- AlphaFold: IPR002379; PF00137

ATPase, subunit C of Fo/Vo complex is the main transmembrane subunit of V-type, A-type and F-type ATP synthases. Subunit C (also called subunit 9, or proteolipid in F-ATPases, or the 16 kDa proteolipid in V-ATPases) was found in the Fo or Vo complex of F- and V-ATPases, respectively. The subunits form an oligomeric c ring that make up the Fo/Vo/Ao rotor, where the actual number of subunits vary greatly among specific enzymes.

ATPases (or ATP synthases) are membrane-bound enzyme complexes/ion transporters that combine ATP synthesis and/or hydrolysis with the transport of protons across a membrane. ATPases can harness the energy from a proton gradient, using the flux of ions across the membrane via the ATPase proton channel to drive the synthesis of ATP. Some ATPases work in reverse, using the energy from the hydrolysis of ATP to create a proton gradient. There are different types of ATPases, which can differ in function (ATP synthesis and/or hydrolysis), structure (F-, V- and A-ATPases contain rotary motors) and in the type of ions they transport.

The F-ATPases (or F1Fo ATPases) and V-ATPases (or V1Vo ATPases) are each composed of two linked complexes: the F1 or V1 complex contains the catalytic core that synthesizes/hydrolyses ATP, and the Fo or Vo complex that forms the membrane-spanning pore. The F- and V-ATPases all contain rotary motors, one that drives proton translocation across the membrane and one that drives ATP synthesis/hydrolysis.

In F-ATPases, the flux of protons through the ATPase channel drives the rotation of the C subunit ring, which in turn is coupled to the rotation of the F1 complex gamma subunit rotor due to the permanent binding between the gamma and epsilon subunits of F1 and the C subunit ring of Fo. The sequential protonation and deprotonation of Asp61 of subunit C is coupled to the stepwise movement of the rotor.

In V-ATPases, there are three proteolipid subunits (c, c′ and c′′) that form part of the proton-conducting pore, each containing a buried glutamic acid residue that is essential for proton transport.

In a recent study c-subunit has been indicated as a critical component of the mitochondrial permeability transition pore.

== Subfamilies ==
- ATPase, Vo complex, proteolipid subunit C, InterPro: IPR000245
- ATPase, Fo complex, subunit C InterPro: IPR000454

== Human proteins containing this domain ==
ATP5MC1; ATP5MC2; ATP5MC3; ATP6V0B; ATP6V0C;

== See also ==
Diarylquinoline
