= ATP synthase alpha/beta subunits =

ATP synthase alpha/beta family, beta-barrel domain
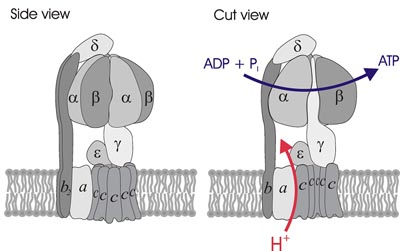
- Simplified model of F_{O}F_{1}-ATPase alias ATP synthase of E. coli. Subunits of the enzyme are labeled accordingly.

Identifiers
- Symbol: ATP-synt_ab_N
- Pfam: PF02874
- InterPro: IPR004100
- PROSITE: PDOC00137
- SCOP2: 1bmf / SCOPe / SUPFAM
Available protein structures:
- PDB: 1fx0B:23-95 1kmhB:23-95 1nvzA:6-73 1skyE:6-80 1e1rD:63-129 1bmfD:63-129 1nbmD:63-129 1cowF:63-129 1h8eE:63-129 1efrE:63-129 1h8hF:63-129 1w0kD:63-129 1e1qE:63-129 1w0jE:63-129 1e79E:63-129 1e16A:4-70 1e1iA:4-70 1v0iA:26-91 2bn9A:21-92 IPR004100 PF02874 (ECOD; PDBsum)
- AlphaFold: IPR004100; PF02874

ATP synthase alpha/beta family, nucleotide-binding domain

Identifiers
- Symbol: ATP-synt_ab
- Pfam: PF00006
- InterPro: IPR000194
- PROSITE: PDOC00137
- SCOP2: 1bmf / SCOPe / SUPFAM
Available protein structures:
- PDB: 1jvaA:273-746 1gppA:283-482 1vdeA:283-736 1um2D:273-287 1lwtA:283-736 1dfaA:283-736 1lwsA:283-736 1fx0B:151-372 1kmhB:151-372 1e1iA:126-348 1e16A:126-348 1e1rD:185-405 1bmfD:185-405 1nbmD:185-405 1cowF:185-405 1h8eE:185-405 1efrE:185-405 1h8hF:185-405 1w0kD:185-405 1e1qE:185-405 1w0jE:185-405 1e79E:185-405 1skyE:137-351 1nvzA:129-349 1v0iA:147-357 2bn9A:154-364 IPR000194 PF00006 (ECOD; PDBsum)
- AlphaFold: IPR000194; PF00006

ATP synthase alpha/beta chain, C terminal domain

Identifiers
- Symbol: ATP-synt_ab_C
- Pfam: PF00306
- InterPro: IPR000793
- SCOP2: 1bmf / SCOPe / SUPFAM
Available protein structures:
- PDB: 1e79B:427-531 1w0jB:427-531 1h8eA:427-531 1h8hA:427-531 1efrA:427-531 1bmfB:427-531 1e1qB:427-531 1cowA:427-531 1e1rB:427-531 1w0kB:427-531 1nbmC:427-531 1skyB:376-480 1kmhA:377-495 1fx0A:377-495 1e16A:361-454 1e1iA:361-454 1nvzA:362-466 IPR000793 PF00306 (ECOD; PDBsum)
- AlphaFold: IPR000793; PF00306

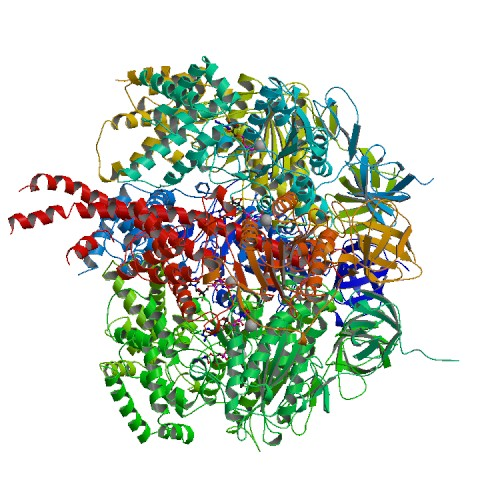
A part of F1 ATP synthase complex: alpha, beta and gamma subunits (PDB: 1bmf)

The alpha and beta (or A and B) subunits are found in the F1, V1, and A1 complexes of F-, V- and A-ATPases, respectively, as well as flagellar (T3SS) ATPase and the termination factor Rho. The subunits make up a ring that contains the ATP-hydrolyzing (or producing) catalytic core. The F-ATPases (or F1Fo ATPases), V-ATPases (or V1Vo ATPases) and A-ATPases (or A1Ao ATPases) are composed of two linked complexes: the F1, V1 or A1 complex containsthat synthesizes/hydrolyses ATP, and the Fo, Vo or Ao complex that forms the membrane-spanning pore. The F-, V- and A-ATPases all contain rotary motors, one that drives proton translocation across the membrane and one that drives ATP synthesis/hydrolysis.

ATPases (or ATP synthases) are membrane-bound enzyme complexes/ion transporters that combine ATP synthesis and/or hydrolysis with the transport of protons across a membrane. ATPases can harness the energy from a proton gradient, using the flux of ions across the membrane via the ATPase proton channel to drive the synthesis of ATP. Some ATPases work in reverse, using the energy from the hydrolysis of ATP to create a proton gradient.

There are different types of ATPases, which can differ in function (ATP synthesis and/or hydrolysis), structure (F-, V- and A-ATPases contain rotary motors) and in the type of ions they transport. The types with this domain include:

- F-ATPases (F1Fo ATPases) are found in mitochondria, chloroplasts and bacterial plasma membranes are the prime producers of ATP, using the proton gradient generated by oxidative phosphorylation (mitochondria) or photosynthesis (chloroplasts).
- V-ATPases (V1Vo ATPases) are primarily found in eukaryotic vacuoles, catalysing ATP hydrolysis to transport solutes and lower pH in organelles.
- A-ATPases (A1Ao ATPases) are found in Archaea and function like F-ATPases.
- T3SS / flagellum ATPases, which are homologous to both parts of the A/F/V rotary ATPases: strongly in the "1" part, and weakly in the "O" part.
- Ring-shaped DNA helicases like the Rho factor, where the ring is homologus to the α/β subunits.

In F-ATPases, there are three copies each of the alpha and beta subunits that form the catalytic core of the F1 complex, while the remaining F1 subunits (gamma, delta, epsilon) form part of the stalks. There is a substrate-binding site on each of the alpha and beta subunits, those on the beta subunits being catalytic, while those on the alpha subunits are regulatory. The alpha and beta subunits form a cylinder that is attached to the central stalk. The alpha/beta subunits undergo a sequence of conformational changes leading to the formation of ATP from ADP, which are induced by the rotation of the gamma subunit, itself is driven by the movement of protons through the Fo complex C subunit.

In V- and A-ATPases, the alpha/A and beta/B subunits of the V1 or A1 complex are homologous to the alpha and beta subunits in the F1 complex of F-ATPases, except that the alpha subunit is catalytic and the beta subunit is regulatory.

The alpha/A and beta/B subunits can each be divided into three regions, or domains, centred on the ATP-binding pocket, and based on structure and function. The central domain contains the nucleotide-binding residues that make direct contact with the ADP/ATP molecule.

== Human proteins containing this domain ==
ATP5F1A; ATP5F1B; ATP6V1A; ATP6V1B7; ATP6V1B4;
