= ATP synthase delta/OSCP subunit =

Subunit of bacterial and chloroplast F-ATPase/synthase

ATP synthase delta (OSCP) subunit
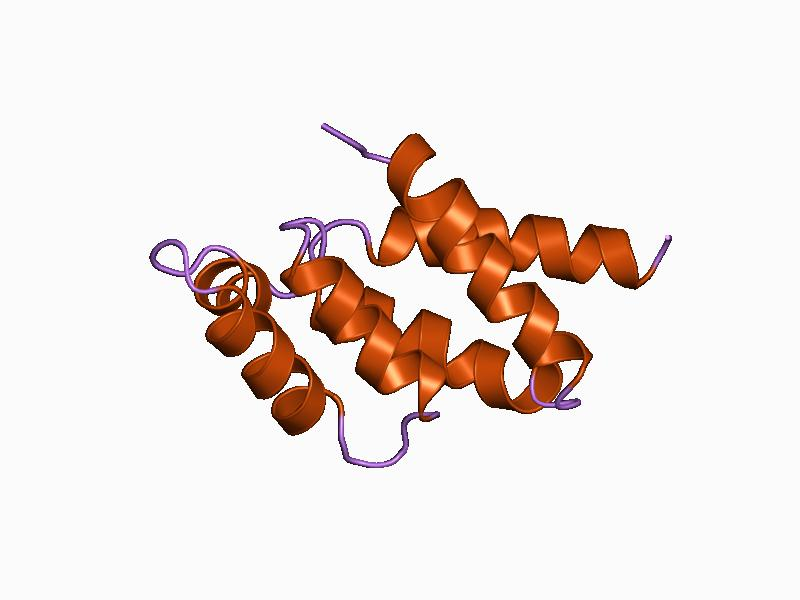
- Structure of the N-terminal domain of the delta subunit of the E. coli ATPsynthase.

Identifiers
- Symbol: OSCP
- Pfam: PF00213
- InterPro: IPR000711
- PROSITE: PDOC00327
- SCOP2: 1abv / SCOPe / SUPFAM
- TCDB: 3.A.2
Available protein structures:
- PDB: 2a7uB:7-135 1abv :7-106 2bo5A:37-143 IPR000711 PF00213 (ECOD; PDBsum)
- AlphaFold: IPR000711; PF00213

ATP synthase delta subunit is a subunit of bacterial and chloroplast F-ATPase/synthase. It is known as OSCP (oligomycin sensitivity conferral protein) in mitochondrial ATPase (note that in mitochondria there is a different delta subunit, ATP synthase delta/epsilon subunit).

The OSCP/delta subunit appears to be part of the peripheral stalk that holds the F_{1} complex α3β3 catalytic core stationary against the torque of the rotating central stalk, and links subunit A of the F_{O} complex with the F_{1} complex. In mitochondria, the peripheral stalk consists of OSCP, as well as F_{O} components F6, B and D. In bacteria and chloroplasts the peripheral stalks have different subunit compositions: delta and two copies of F_{O} component B (bacteria), or delta and F_{O} components B and B' (chloroplasts).

F-ATPases lacking this subunit generally transport sodium instead of protons. They are proposed to be called N-ATPases, since they seem to form a distinct group that is further apart from usual F-ATPases than A-ATPases are from V-ATPases.

Human delta subunit of ATP synthase is coded by gene ATP5PO.
