= ATP5F1E =

Protein-coding gene in the species Homo sapiens

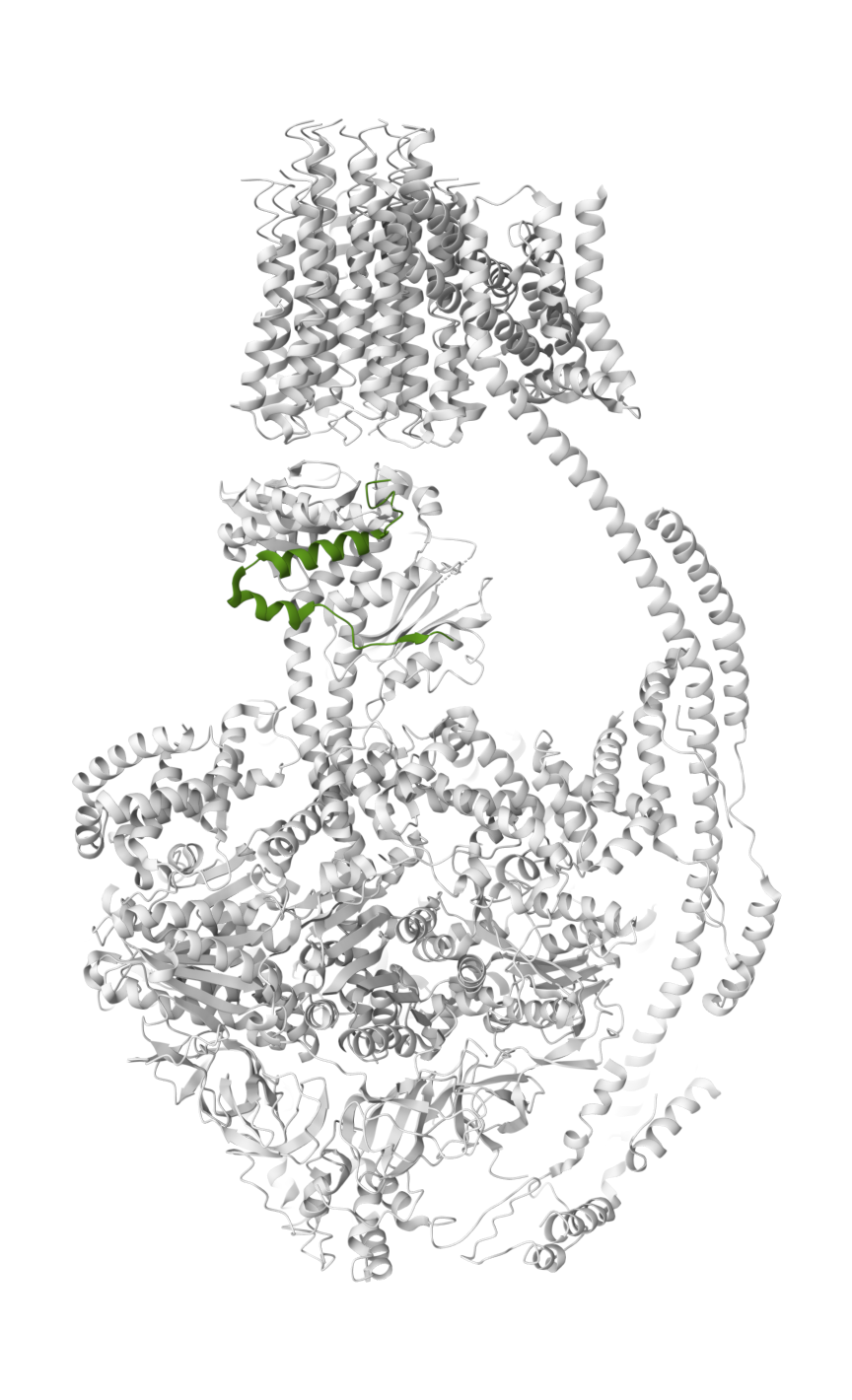
- Structure of the F1 structural domain of ATPase

Identifiers
- Aliases: ATP5F1E, ATPE, MC5DN3, ATP synthase, H+ transporting, mitochondrial F1 complex, epsilon subunit, ATP synthase F1 subunit epsilon, ATP5E
- External IDs: OMIM: 606153; MGI: 1855697; GeneCards: ATP5F1E

Gene location (Human)
Chr.	Chromosome 20 (human)
Band	20q13.32	Start	59,025,475 bp
Band	20q13.32	End	59,032,345 bp

Gene location (Mouse)
Chr.	Chromosome 2 (mouse)
Band	2|2 H4	Start	174,302,865 bp
Band	2|2 H4	End	174,305,898 bp
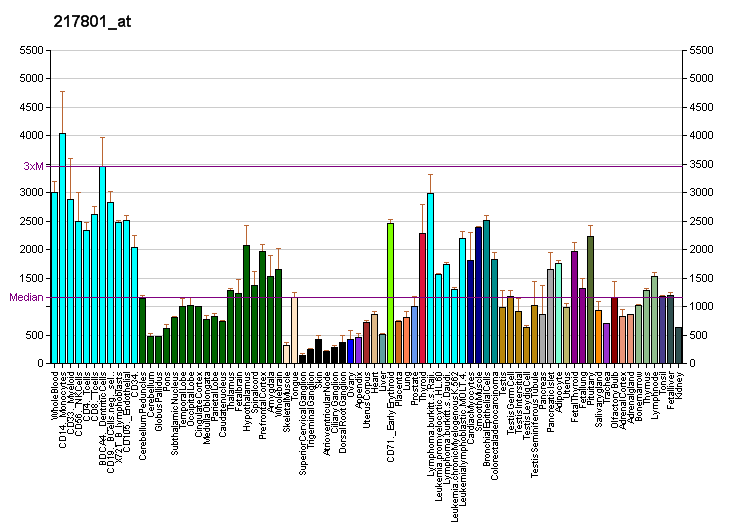
RNA expression pattern
Bgee	Human / Mouse (ortholog); Top expressed in: renal medulla; optic nerve; pars reticulata; trabecular bone; superior surface of tongue; pars compacta; pylorus; lateral nuclear group of thalamus; external globus pallidus; skin of hip / Top expressed in: muscle of thigh; right kidney; sternocleidomastoid muscle; digastric muscle; temporal muscle; intercostal muscle; medial head of gastrocnemius muscle; triceps brachii muscle; atrioventricular valve; lip; More reference expression data
BioGPS	More reference expression data
Gene ontology
Molecular function	hydrolase activity; transmembrane transporter activity; proton-transporting ATP synthase activity, rotational mechanism; ATPase activity
Cellular component	membrane; mitochondrial proton-transporting ATP synthase complex, catalytic sector F(1); proton-transporting ATP synthase complex, catalytic core F(1); mitochondrial matrix; mitochondrion; mitochondrial inner membrane; mitochondrial proton-transporting ATP synthase complex
Biological process	ion transport; ATP synthesis coupled proton transport; mitochondrial ATP synthesis coupled proton transport; ATP biosynthetic process; cristae formation
Sources:Amigo / QuickGO
Orthologs
Databases	NCBI: entry; OMA: entry
Species	Human	Mouse
Entrez	514	67126
Ensembl	ENSG00000124172	ENSMUSG00000016252
UniProt	P56381	P56382
RefSeq (mRNA)	NM_006886	NM_025983
RefSeq (protein)	NP_008817	NP_080259
Location (UCSC)	Chr 20: 59.03 – 59.03 Mb	Chr 2: 174.3 – 174.31 Mb
PubMed search
- Wikidata
View/Edit Human	View/Edit Mouse

Mitochondrial ATP synthase epsilon chain
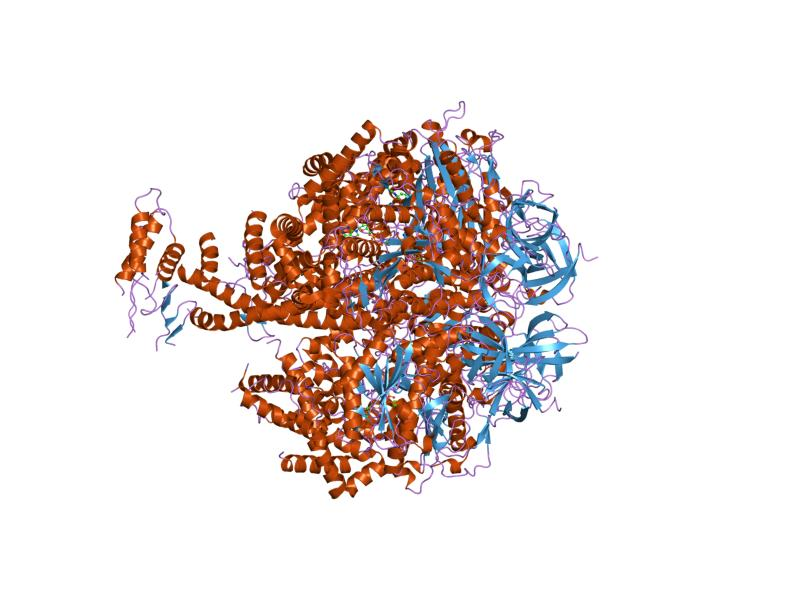
- ground state structure of f1-atpase from bovine heart mitochondria (bovine f1-atpase crystallised in the absence of azide)

Identifiers
- Symbol: ATP-synt_Eps
- Pfam: PF04627
- InterPro: IPR006721
- SCOP2: 1e79 / SCOPe / SUPFAM
Available protein structures:
- PDB: IPR006721 PF04627 (ECOD; PDBsum)
- AlphaFold: IPR006721; PF04627

ATP synthase F1 subunit epsilon, mitochondrial is an enzyme that in humans is encoded by the ATP5F1E gene. The protein encoded by ATP5F1E is a subunit of ATP synthase, also known as Complex V. Variations of this gene have been associated with a condition called mitochondrial complex V deficiency, nuclear type 3 (MC5DN3) and papillary thyroid cancer.

The ATP5F1E gene, located on the q arm of chromosome 20 in position 13.32, is made up of 3 exons and is 3,690 base pairs in length. The ATP5F1E protein weighs 5.7 kDa and is composed of 51 amino acids. Two pseudogenes of this gene are located on chromosomes 4 and 13.

ATP5F1E is located on the rotating central stalk of ATP synthase, and can be contracted or extended. When it is contracted, it inhibits the ATP synthase active site, preventing ATP from being produced or degraded. It changes shape based on the rotation of the gamma subunit of the stalk, and is also thought to become extended in the presence of ADP, acting as a "safety lock" preventing the wasteful degradation of ATP.

== Naming ==
This gene is named for the subunit it encodes of the version of ATP synthase found in mitochondria. Mitochondrial ATP synthase catalyzes ATP synthesis through the difference in protein concentrations across a cellular membrane. ATP synthase is composed of two linked multi-subunit complexes, each composed of multiple proteins: the water-soluble catalytic core, F_{1}, and the membrane-spanning component, F_{o}, comprising the proton channel. The catalytic portion of mitochondrial ATP synthase consists of 5 different kinds of subunits (alpha, beta, gamma, delta, and epsilon), each catalytic core containing 3 alpha, 3 beta, one gamma, one delta, and one epsilon. This gene encodes the epsilon subunit of the catalytic core.

== Function ==
Mitochondrial membrane ATP synthase (F_{1}F_{o} ATP synthase or Complex V) produces ATP from ADP in the presence of a proton gradient (difference in proton concentration) across the membrane generated by electron transport complexes of the respiratory chain. F-type ATPases consist of two structural domains or parts: F_{1}, which contains the catalytic core outside of the membrane; and F_{o}, which contains the proton channel reaching across the membrane; both linked together by a central stalk and a peripheral stalk. During catalysis, ATP synthesis in the active site of F_{1} is coupled, through a mechanism involving the rotation of the central stalk, to the motion of protons across the membrane. ATP5F1E is part of the F_{1} domain, and more specifically part of the rotating central stalk. Rotation of the central stalk against the surrounding alpha_{3}beta_{3} subunits, leads to the hydrolysis of ATP in three separate catalytic sites on the beta subunits (By similarity).

Being located in the stalk region of the F_{1} complex, the epsilon unit acts as an inhibitor of the active site of the ATPase. The epsilon subunit can assume two conformations, or shapes: contracted and extended. The latter inhibits ATP hydrolysis, while the former does not. The conformation of the epsilon subunit is determined by the direction of rotation of the gamma subunit of the ATPase, and possibly by the presence of ADP. The epsilon subunit is thought to become extended in the presence of ADP, thereby acting as a safety lock to prevent the wasteful degradation of ATP to ADP through hydrolysis.

== Clinical significance ==
Mutations in the ATP5F1E gene cause mitochondrial complex V deficiency, nuclear 3 (MC5DN3), a mitochondrial disorder with heterogeneous clinical manifestations including dysmorphic features, psychomotor retardation, hypotonia, growth retardation, cardiomyopathy, enlarged liver, hypoplastic kidneys and elevated lactate levels in urine, plasma and cerebrospinal fluid. Pathogenic variations have included a homozygous Tyr12Cys mutation in the ATP5E gene, which has been linked with neonatal onset complex V deficiency with lactic acidosis, 3-methylglutaconic aciduria, mild mental retardation and developed peripheral neuropathy.

Reduced expression of ATP5F1E is significantly associated with the diagnosis of papillary thyroid cancer and may serve as an early tumor marker of the disease. Papillary thyroid cancer is the most common type of thyroid cancer, representing 75 percent to 85 percent of all thyroid cancer cases. It occurs more frequently in women and presents in the 20–55 year age group. It is also the predominant cancer type in children with thyroid cancer, and in patients with thyroid cancer who have had previous radiation to the head and neck.

== Interactions ==
ATP5F1E has been shown to have 34 binary protein-protein interactions including 28 co-complex interactions. ATP5F1E appears to interact with ATP5F1D, AGTRAP, CYP17A1, UBE2N.
