= ATP synthase delta/epsilon subunit =

ATP synthase, F1 complex, delta/epsilon subunit

Identifiers
- Symbol: ATP_synth_F1_dsu/esu
- InterPro: IPR001469
- CDD: cd12152
Available protein structures:
- PDB: IPR001469
- AlphaFold: IPR001469

ATP synthase delta/epsilon subunit is a part of the ATP synthase and the F-ATPase family in general. It is known as the delta subunit in mitochondrial ATP syntheses, and the epsilon subunit in bacterial and chloroplastic ATP syntheses. It is part of the rotor between subunits F_{1} and F_{O}. Its C terminal domain seems to inhibit ATPase activity of the synthase.
