= J147 =

Anti-ageing drug

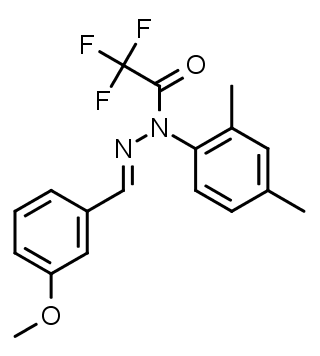

Legal status
- Legal status: US: Investigational New Drug

Identifiers
- IUPAC name: N-(2,4-dimethylphenyl)-2,2,2-trifluoro-N-[(E)-(3-methoxyphenyl)methylideneamino]acetamide
- CAS Number: 1807913-16-1 1146963-51-0 (non-specific stereochemistry)
- PubChem CID: 25229652
- ChemSpider: 29341612
- UNII: Z41H3C5BT9
- CompTox Dashboard (EPA): DTXSID501045787

Chemical and physical data
- Formula: C_{18}H_{17}F_{3}N_{2}O_{2}
- Molar mass: 350.341 g·mol^{−1}
- 3D model (JSmol): Interactive image
- SMILES: CC1=C(C=CC(=C1)C)N(C(C(F)(F)F)=O)\N=C\C2=CC(=CC=C2)OC
- InChI: InChI=1S/C18H17F3N2O2/c1-12-7-8-16(13(2)9-12)23(17(24)18(19,20)21)22-11-14-5-4-6-15(10-14)25-3/h4-11H,1-3H3/b22-11+; Key:HYMZAYGFKNNHDN-SSDVNMTOSA-N

J147 is an experimental drug with reported effects against both Alzheimer's disease and ageing in mouse models of accelerated aging.

The approach that lead to development of the J147 drug was to screen candidate molecules for anti-aging effects, instead of targeting the amyloid plaques. It is contrary to most other approaches to developing drugs against Alzheimer's disease that target the plaque deposits in the brain.

The J147 drug is also reported to address other biological aging factors, such as preventing the leakage of blood from microvessels in mice brains. The development of J147 follows the chemical pharmacological way, contrary to biological ways that exploit e.g. use of bacteriophages.

Its derivative CAD-31 has enhanced neurogenic activity over J147 in human neural precursor cells. CAD-31 enhances the use of free fatty acids for energy production by shifting of the metabolic profile of fatty acids toward the production of ketone bodies, the only alternative source of energy in the brain when glucose levels are low.

The target molecule is a protein called ATP synthase, which is found in the mitochondria.
