= ATPAF1 =

Protein-coding gene in humans

Identifiers
- Aliases: ATPAF1, ATP11, ATP11p, ATP synthase mitochondrial F1 complex assembly factor 1
- External IDs: OMIM: 608917; MGI: 2180560; GeneCards: ATPAF1

Gene location (Human)
Chr.	Chromosome 1 (human)
Band	1p33	Start	46,632,737 bp
Band	1p33	End	46,673,867 bp

Gene location (Mouse)
Chr.	Chromosome 4 (mouse)
Band	4|4 D1	Start	115,642,009 bp
Band	4|4 D1	End	115,679,852 bp
RNA expression pattern
Bgee	Human / Mouse (ortholog); Top expressed in: myocardium of left ventricle; cardiac muscle tissue of right atrium; vastus lateralis muscle; right adrenal cortex; right ventricle; apex of heart; right auricle of heart; gastrocnemius muscle; muscle of thigh; caudate nucleus / Top expressed in: facial motor nucleus; muscle of thigh; anterior horn of spinal cord; right kidney; medial geniculate nucleus; substantia nigra; spermatid; superior frontal gyrus; tail of embryo; lateral geniculate nucleus; More reference expression data
BioGPS	n/a
Gene ontology
Molecular function	protein binding
Cellular component	mitochondrion
Biological process	mitochondrial proton-transporting ATP synthase complex assembly; protein-containing complex assembly
Sources:Amigo / QuickGO
Orthologs
Databases	NCBI: entry; OMA: entry
Species	Human	Mouse
Entrez	64756	230649
Ensembl	ENSG00000123472	ENSMUSG00000028710
UniProt	Q5TC12	Q811I0
RefSeq (mRNA)	NM_022745; NM_001042546; NM_001243728; NM_001256418; NM_001394565	NM_181040; NM_001369233
RefSeq (protein)	NP_001036011; NP_001230657; NP_001243347; NP_073582	NP_001356162; NP_851383
Location (UCSC)	Chr 1: 46.63 – 46.67 Mb	Chr 4: 115.64 – 115.68 Mb
PubMed search
- Wikidata
View/Edit Human	View/Edit Mouse

ATP synthase mitochondrial F1 complex assembly factor 1, also known as ATP11 homolog, is a protein that in humans is encoded by the ATPAF1 gene.

== Function ==
This gene encodes an assembly factor for the F(1) component of the mitochondrial ATP synthase. This protein binds specifically to the F1 beta subunit and is thought to prevent this subunit from forming nonproductive homooligomers during enzyme assembly. Alternatively spliced transcript variants have been identified, but the biological validity of some of these variants has not been determined.
