= ATP10 protein =

Identifiers
- Symbol: ATP-synt_10
- Pfam: PF05176
- InterPro: IPR007849
Available protein structures:
- PDB: IPR007849 PF05176 (ECOD; PDBsum)
- AlphaFold: IPR007849; PF05176

In molecular biology, ATP10 protein (mitochondrial ATPase complex subunit ATP10) is an ATP synthase assembly factor. It is essential for the assembly of the mitochondrial F_{1}-F_{0} complex. A yeast nuclear gene (ATP10) encodes a product that is essential for the assembly of a functional mitochondrial ATPase complex. Mutations in ATP10 induce a loss of rutamycin sensitivity in the mitochondrial ATPase, but do not affect the respiratory enzymes. ATP10 has a molecular weight of 30,293 Da and its primary structure is not related to any known subunit of the yeast or mammalian mitochondrial ATPase complexes. ATP10 is associated with the mitochondrial membrane. It is suggested that the ATP10 product is not a subunit of the ATPase complex but rather a protein required for the assembly of the F_{0} sector of the complex.
