= ATP5F1C =

Protein-coding gene in the species Homo sapiens

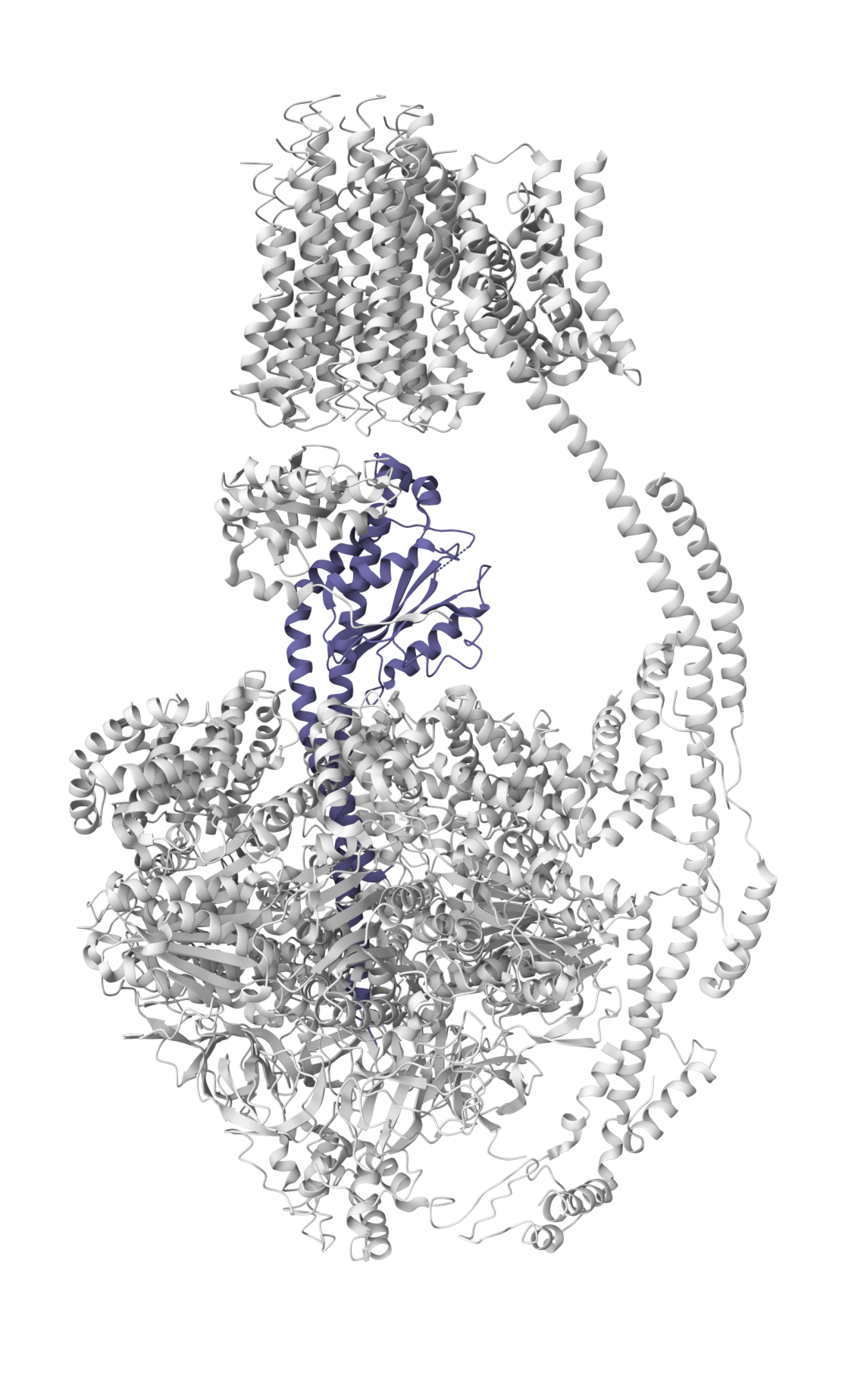

Identifiers
- Aliases: ATP5F1C, ATP5C, ATP5CL1, ATP synthase, H+ transporting, mitochondrial F1 complex, gamma polypeptide 1, ATP5C1, ATP synthase F1 subunit gamma
- External IDs: OMIM: 108729; MGI: 1261437; GeneCards: ATP5F1C

Gene location (Human)
Chr.	Chromosome 10 (human)
Band	10p14	Start	7,788,147 bp
Band	10p14	End	7,807,815 bp

Gene location (Mouse)
Chr.	Chromosome 2 (mouse)
Band	2|2 A1	Start	10,060,827 bp
Band	2|2 A1	End	10,085,321 bp
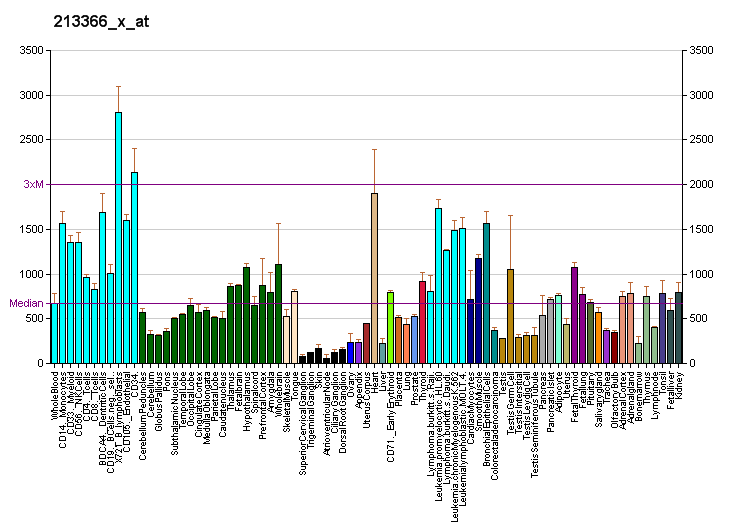

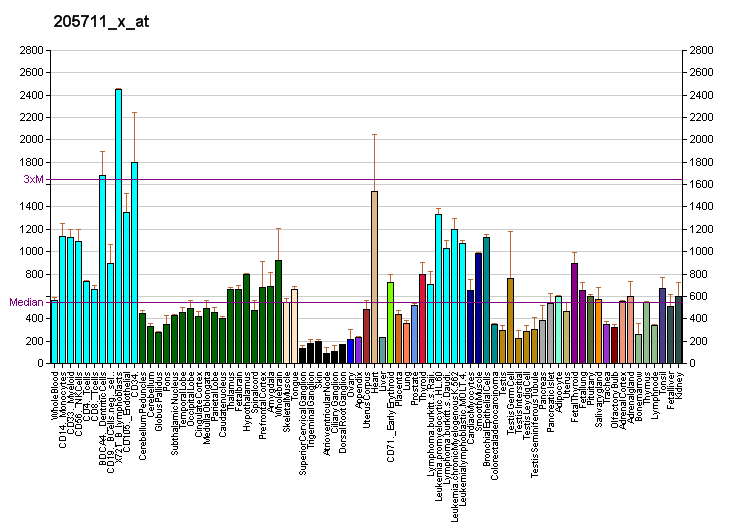

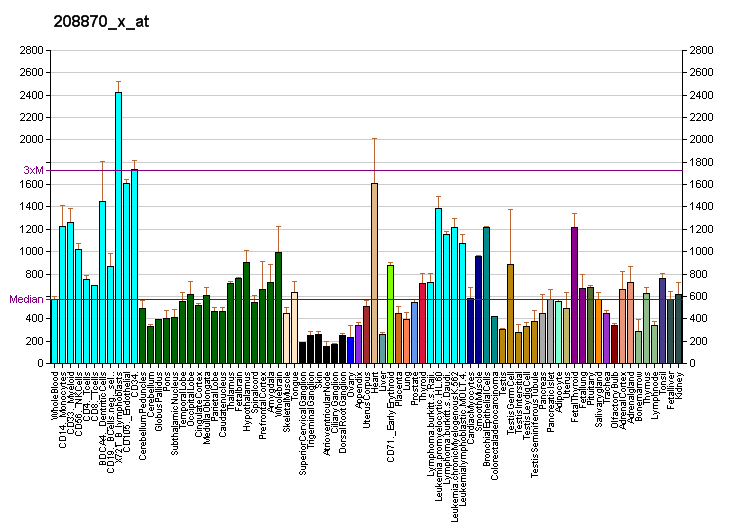
RNA expression pattern
Bgee	Human / Mouse (ortholog); Top expressed in: right ventricle; myocardium of left ventricle; vena cava; triceps brachii muscle; body of tongue; biceps brachii; deltoid muscle; right adrenal gland; right adrenal cortex; glutes / Top expressed in: myocardium of ventricle; cardiac muscles; cardiac muscle tissue of left ventricle; thoracic diaphragm; extraocular muscle; masseter muscle; plantaris muscle; triceps surae; interventricular septum; quadriceps femoris muscle; More reference expression data
BioGPS	More reference expression data
Gene ontology
Molecular function	proton-transporting ATP synthase activity, rotational mechanism; transmembrane transporter activity; ATPase activity; RNA binding; proton-transporting ATPase activity, rotational mechanism
Cellular component	mitochondrial proton-transporting ATP synthase complex; membrane; myelin sheath; mitochondrial matrix; mitochondrion; mitochondrial proton-transporting ATP synthase complex, catalytic sector F(1); mitochondrial inner membrane; proton-transporting ATP synthase complex, catalytic core F(1); extracellular exosome
Biological process	mitochondrial ATP synthesis coupled proton transport; ion transport; oxidative phosphorylation; ATP synthesis coupled proton transport; ATP biosynthetic process; cristae formation; transport
Sources:Amigo / QuickGO
Orthologs
Databases	NCBI: entry; OMA: entry
Species	Human	Mouse
Entrez	509	11949
Ensembl	ENSG00000165629	ENSMUSG00000025781
UniProt	P36542	Q91VR2
RefSeq (mRNA)	NM_001001973; NM_005174; NM_001320886	NM_001112738; NM_020615; NM_001374641
RefSeq (protein)	NP_001001973; NP_001307815; NP_005165	NP_001106209; NP_065640; NP_001361570
Location (UCSC)	Chr 10: 7.79 – 7.81 Mb	Chr 2: 10.06 – 10.09 Mb
PubMed search
- Wikidata
View/Edit Human	View/Edit Mouse

The human ATP5F1C gene encodes the gamma subunit of an enzyme called mitochondrial ATP synthase.

This gene encodes a subunit of mitochondrial ATP synthase. Mitochondrial ATP synthase catalyzes adenosine triphosphate (ATP) synthesis, utilizing an electrochemical gradient of protons across the inner membrane during oxidative phosphorylation. ATP synthase is composed of two linked multi-subunit complexes: the soluble catalytic core, F_{1}, and the membrane-spanning component, F_{0}, comprising the proton channel. The catalytic portion of mitochondrial ATP synthase consists of 5 different subunits (alpha, beta, gamma, delta, and epsilon) assembled with a stoichiometry of 3 alpha, 3 beta, and a single representative of the other 3. The proton channel consists of three main subunits (a, b, c). This gene encodes the gamma subunit of the catalytic core. Alternatively spliced transcript variants encoding different isoforms have been identified. This gene also has a pseudogene on chromosome 14.
