= ATP5MC2 =

Protein-coding gene in humans

Identifiers
- Aliases: ATP5MC2, ATP5A, ATP synthase, H+ transporting, mitochondrial Fo complex subunit C2 (subunit 9), ATP synthase membrane subunit c locus 2, ATP5G2
- External IDs: OMIM: 603193; MGI: 1915192; GeneCards: ATP5MC2

Gene location (Human)
| Chr. | Chromosome 12 (human) |
| Band | 12q13.13 | Start | 53,632,726 bp |
| Band | 12q13.13 | End | 53,677,408 bp |

Gene location (Mouse)
| Chr. | Chromosome 15 (mouse) |
| Band | 15|15 F3 | Start | 102,571,299 bp |
| Band | 15|15 F3 | End | 102,580,787 bp |
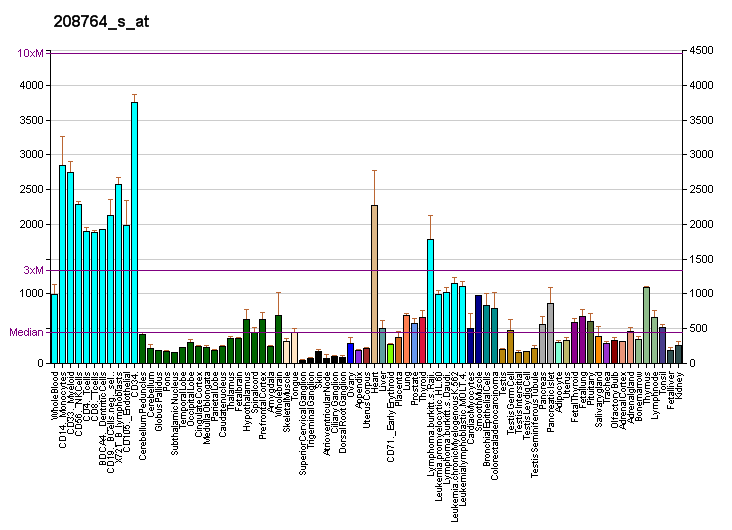

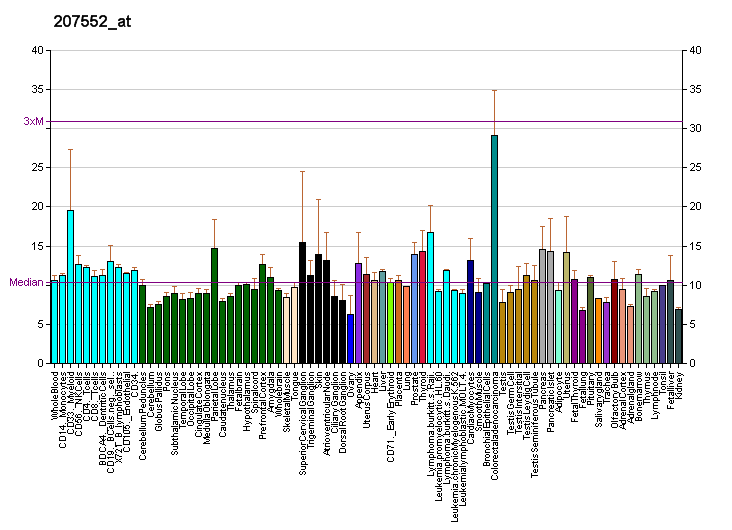
RNA expression pattern
| Bgee | Human / Mouse (ortholog); Top expressed in: apex of heart; muscle of thigh; gastrocnemius muscle; islet of Langerhans; right uterine tube; muscle layer of sigmoid colon; anterior pituitary; body of stomach; embryo; granulocyte / Top expressed in: embryo; blastocyst; embryo; quadriceps femoris muscle; neural tube; right kidney; stomach; epiblast; esophagus; yolk sac; More reference expression data |
| BioGPS | More reference expression data |
Gene ontology
| Molecular function | proton transmembrane transporter activity; lipid binding; transporter activity; proton-transporting ATP synthase activity, rotational mechanism; protein binding |
| Cellular component | proton-transporting ATP synthase complex, coupling factor F(o); integral component of membrane; mitochondrial outer membrane; proton-transporting two-sector ATPase complex, proton-transporting domain; mitochondrial proton-transporting ATP synthase complex; membrane; mitochondrion; mitochondrial membranes; mitochondrial proton-transporting ATP synthase complex, coupling factor F(o) |
| Biological process | ion transport; ATP biosynthetic process; ATP synthesis coupled proton transport; cristae formation; mitochondrial ATP synthesis coupled proton transport |
Sources:Amigo / QuickGO
Orthologs
| Databases | NCBI: entry; OMA: entry |
| Species | Human | Mouse |
| Entrez | 517 | 67942 |
| Ensembl | ENSG00000135390 | ENSMUSG00000062683 |
| UniProt | Q06055 | P56383 |
| RefSeq (mRNA) | NM_001002031; NM_005176; NM_001330269 | NM_026468 |
| RefSeq (protein) | NP_001002031; NP_001317198; NP_005167; NP_001356682; NP_001356683 NP_001356684; NP_001356685; NP_001356686; NP_001356687 | NP_080744 |
| Location (UCSC) | Chr 12: 53.63 – 53.68 Mb | Chr 15: 102.57 – 102.58 Mb |
| PubMed search |
- Wikidata
| View/Edit Human | View/Edit Mouse |

The ATP5MC2 gene is one of three human paralogs that encode membrane subunit c of the mitochondrial ATP synthase.

This gene encodes a subunit of mitochondrial ATP synthase. Mitochondrial ATP synthase catalyzes ATP synthesis, utilizing an electrochemical gradient of protons across the inner membrane during oxidative phosphorylation. ATP synthase is composed of two linked multi-subunit complexes: the soluble catalytic core, F1, and the membrane-spanning component, F0, comprising the proton channel. The catalytic portion of mitochondrial ATP synthase consists of 5 different subunits (alpha, beta, gamma, delta, and epsilon) assembled with a stoichiometry of 3 alpha, 3 beta, and single representatives of the gamma, delta, and epsilon subunits. The proton channel likely has nine subunits (a, b, c, d, e, f, g, F6 and 8). There are three separate genes which encode subunit c of the proton channel and they specify precursors with different import sequences but identical mature proteins. The protein encoded by this gene is one of three precursors of subunit c. Alternatively spliced transcript variants encoding different isoforms have been identified. This gene has multiple pseudogenes.
