= ATP5F1A =

Protein-coding gene in the species Homo sapiens

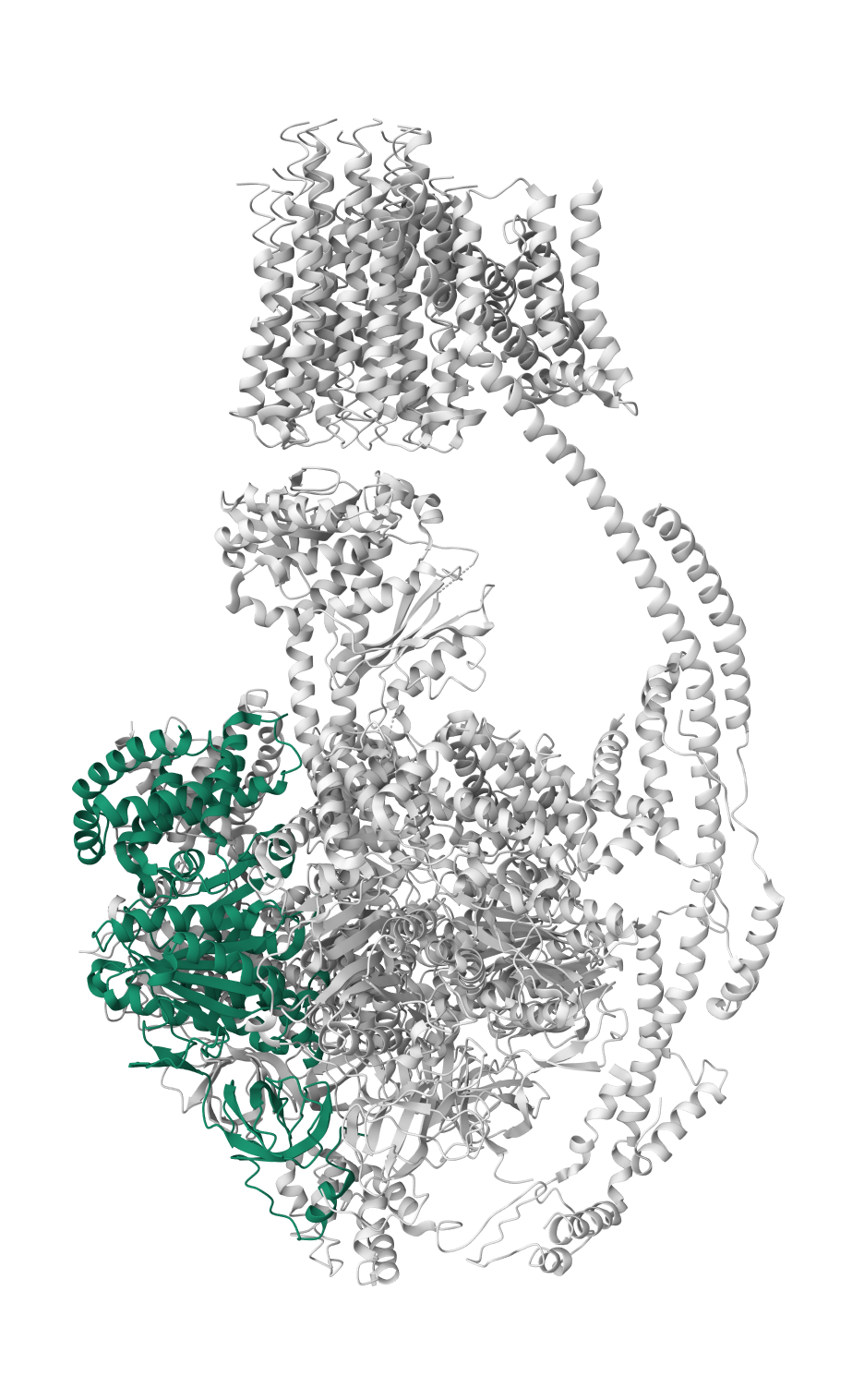

Identifiers
- Aliases: ATP5F1A, ATP5A, ATP5AL2, ATPM, HEL-S-123m, MC5DN4, MOM2, OMR, ORM, hATP1, COXPD22, ATP synthase, H+ transporting, mitochondrial F1 complex, alpha 1, ATP synthase, H+ transporting, mitochondrial F1 complex, alpha subunit 1, cardiac muscle, ATP5A1, ATP synthase F1 subunit alpha
- External IDs: OMIM: 164360; MGI: 88115; GeneCards: ATP5F1A

Gene location (Human)
Chr.	Chromosome 18 (human)
Band	18q21.1	Start	46,080,248 bp
Band	18q21.1	End	46,104,334 bp

Gene location (Mouse)
Chr.	Chromosome 18 (mouse)
Band	18 E3|18 52.38 cM	Start	77,861,429 bp
Band	18 E3|18 52.38 cM	End	77,870,569 bp
RNA expression pattern
Bgee	Human / Mouse (ortholog); Top expressed in: right ventricle; renal medulla; middle temporal gyrus; jejunal mucosa; tibia; parietal pleura; myocardium of left ventricle; kidney tubule; epithelium of nasopharynx; palpebral conjunctiva / Top expressed in: heart; muscle of thigh; quadriceps femoris muscle; human kidney; renal cortex; muscle tissue; skeletal muscle tissue; proximal tubule; right kidney; cerebellar cortex; More reference expression data
BioGPS	n/a
Gene ontology
Molecular function	nucleotide binding; transmembrane transporter activity; ATPase activity; protein binding; MHC class I protein binding; ATP binding; adenyl ribonucleotide binding; RNA binding; angiostatin binding; proton-transporting ATP synthase activity, rotational mechanism; ADP binding
Cellular component	mitochondrial proton-transporting ATP synthase complex; membrane; myelin sheath; plasma membrane; mitochondrial matrix; mitochondrion; mitochondrial inner membrane; proton-transporting ATP synthase complex, catalytic core F(1); COP9 signalosome; extracellular exosome; extracellular matrix; proton-transporting ATP synthase complex; mitochondrial proton-transporting ATP synthase complex, catalytic sector F(1)
Biological process	embryo development; lipid metabolism; mitochondrial ATP synthesis coupled proton transport; ion transport; negative regulation of endothelial cell proliferation; ATP metabolic process; ATP synthesis coupled proton transport; ATP biosynthetic process; cristae formation; positive regulation of blood vessel endothelial cell migration; transport; response to oxidative stress; electron transport chain; proton transmembrane transport
Sources:Amigo / QuickGO
Orthologs
Databases	NCBI: entry; OMA: entry
Species	Human	Mouse
Entrez	498	11946
Ensembl	ENSG00000152234	ENSMUSG00000025428
UniProt	P25705	Q03265
RefSeq (mRNA)	NM_001001935; NM_001001937; NM_001257334; NM_001257335; NM_004046	NM_007505
RefSeq (protein)	NP_001001935; NP_001001937; NP_001244263; NP_001244264; NP_004037	NP_031531
Location (UCSC)	Chr 18: 46.08 – 46.1 Mb	Chr 18: 77.86 – 77.87 Mb
PubMed search
- Wikidata
View/Edit Human	View/Edit Mouse

ATP synthase F1 subunit alpha, mitochondrial is an enzyme that in humans is encoded by the ATP5F1A gene.

== Function ==
This gene encodes a subunit of mitochondrial ATP synthase. Mitochondrial ATP synthase catalyzes ATP synthesis, using an electrochemical gradient of protons across the inner membrane during oxidative phosphorylation. ATP synthase is composed of two linked multi-subunit complexes: the soluble catalytic core, F_{1}, and the membrane-spanning component, F_{o}, comprising the proton channel. The catalytic portion of mitochondrial ATP synthase consists of 5 different subunits (alpha, beta, gamma, delta, and epsilon) assembled with a stoichiometry of 3 alpha, 3 beta, and a single representative of the other 3. The proton channel consists of three main subunits (a, b, c). This gene encodes the alpha subunit of the catalytic core. Alternatively spliced transcript variants encoding the same protein have been identified. Pseudogenes of this gene are located on chromosomes 9, 2, and 16.

== Structure ==
The ATP5F1A gene, located on the q arm of chromosome 18 in position 21, is made up of 13 exons and is 20,090 base pairs in length. The ATP5F1A protein weighs 59.7 kDa and is composed of 553 amino acids. The protein is a subunit of the catalytic portion of the F_{1}F_{o} ATPase, also known as Complex V, which consists of 14 nuclear and 2 mitochondrial -encoded subunits. As an alpha subunit, ATP5F1A is contained within the catalytic F_{1} portion of the complex. The nomenclature of the enzyme has a long history. The F_{1} fraction derives its name from the term "Fraction 1" and F_{o} (written as a subscript letter "o", not "zero") derives its name from being the binding fraction for oligomycin, a type of naturally-derived antibiotic that is able to inhibit the F_{o} unit of ATP synthase. The F_{1} particle is large and can be seen in the transmission electron microscope by negative staining. These are particles of 9 nm diameter that pepper the inner mitochondrial membrane. They were originally called elementary particles and were thought to contain the entire respiratory apparatus of the mitochondrion, but, through a long series of experiments, Efraim Racker and his colleagues (who first isolated the F_{1} particle in 1961) were able to show that this particle is correlated with ATPase activity in uncoupled mitochondria and with the ATPase activity in submitochondrial particles created by exposing mitochondria to ultrasound. This ATPase activity was further associated with the creation of ATP by a long series of experiments in many laboratories.

== Function ==
Mitochondrial membrane ATP synthase (F_{1}F_{o} ATP synthase or Complex V) produces ATP from ADP in the presence of a proton gradient across the membrane which is generated by electron transport complexes of the respiratory chain. F-type ATPases consist of two structural domains, F_{1} - containing the extramembraneous catalytic core, and F_{o} - containing the membrane proton channel, linked together by a central stalk and a peripheral stalk. During catalysis, ATP synthesis in the catalytic domain of F_{1} is coupled via a rotary mechanism of the central stalk subunits to proton translocation. Subunits alpha and beta form the catalytic core in F_{1}. Rotation of the central stalk against the surrounding alpha(3)beta(3) subunits leads to hydrolysis of ATP in three separate catalytic sites on the beta subunits. Subunit alpha does not bear the catalytic high-affinity ATP-binding sites.

== Clinical significance ==
Mutations affecting the ATP5F1A gene cause combined oxidative phosphorylation deficiency 22 (COXPD22), a mitochondrial disorder characterized by intrauterine growth retardation, microcephaly, hypotonia, pulmonary hypertension, failure to thrive, encephalopathy, and heart failure. Mutations on the ATP5F1A gene also cause mitochondrial complex V deficiency, nuclear 4 (MC5DN4), a mitochondrial disorder with heterogeneous clinical manifestations including dysmorphic features, psychomotor retardation, hypotonia, growth retardation, cardiomyopathy, enlarged liver, hypoplastic kidneys and elevated lactate levels in urine, plasma and cerebrospinal fluid.

Resveratrol inhibition of the F1 catalytic core increases adenosine monophosphate (AMP) levels, thereby activating the AMP-activated protein kinase enzyme.
