= ATP5MC3 =

Protein-coding gene in humans

Identifiers
- Aliases: ATP5MC3, P3, ATP synthase, H+ transporting, mitochondrial Fo complex subunit C3 (subunit 9), ATP synthase membrane subunit c locus 3, ATP5G3, DYTSPG
- External IDs: OMIM: 602736; MGI: 2442035; GeneCards: ATP5MC3

Gene location (Human)
Chr.	Chromosome 2 (human)
Band	2q31.1	Start	175,176,258 bp
Band	2q31.1	End	175,181,710 bp

Gene location (Mouse)
Chr.	Chromosome 2 (mouse)
Band	2|2 C3	Start	73,738,791 bp
Band	2|2 C3	End	73,741,670 bp
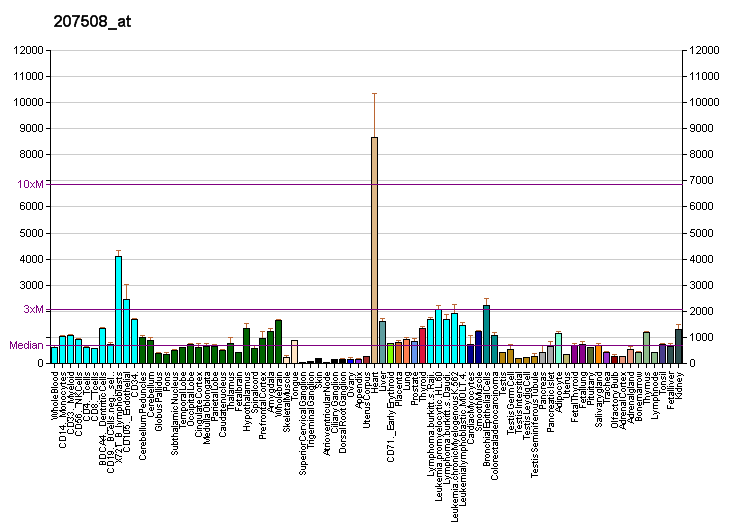

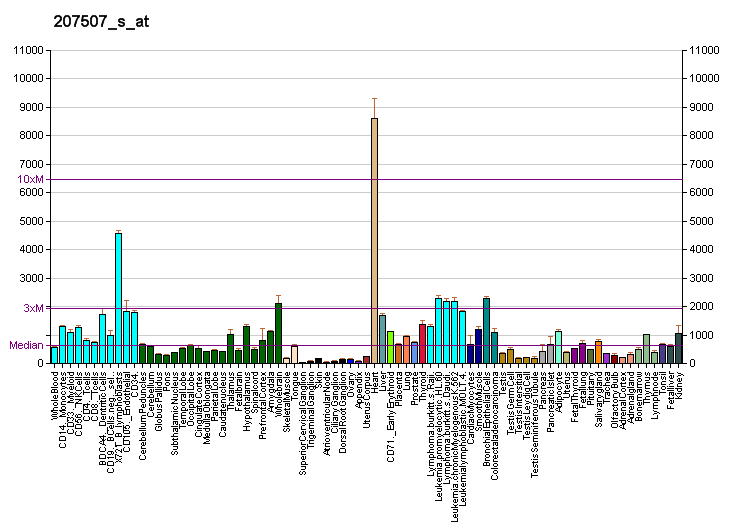
RNA expression pattern
Bgee	Human / Mouse (ortholog); Top expressed in: right ventricle; myocardium of left ventricle; body of tongue; renal medulla; pons; apex of heart; vena cava; thoracic diaphragm; mucosa of transverse colon; atrium / Top expressed in: myocardium of ventricle; atrioventricular valve; endocardial cushion; right kidney; digastric muscle; extraocular muscle; thoracic diaphragm; cardiac muscles; renal corpuscle; deep cerebellar nuclei; More reference expression data
BioGPS	More reference expression data
Gene ontology
Molecular function	transporter activity; proton transmembrane transporter activity; lipid binding; proton-transporting ATP synthase activity, rotational mechanism
Cellular component	integral component of membrane; proton-transporting two-sector ATPase complex, proton-transporting domain; mitochondrial proton-transporting ATP synthase complex; membrane; mitochondrial membranes; mitochondrial outer membrane; mitochondrion; proton-transporting ATP synthase complex, coupling factor F(o); mitochondrial proton-transporting ATP synthase complex, coupling factor F(o)
Biological process	ion transport; ATP biosynthetic process; ATP synthesis coupled proton transport; cristae formation; mitochondrial ATP synthesis coupled proton transport
Sources:Amigo / QuickGO
Orthologs
Databases	NCBI: entry; OMA: entry
Species	Human	Mouse
Entrez	518	228033
Ensembl	ENSG00000154518	ENSMUSG00000018770
UniProt	P48201	P56384
RefSeq (mRNA)	NM_001689; NM_001002258; NM_001190329; NM_001002256	NM_001301721; NM_001301722; NM_175015
RefSeq (protein)	NP_001002258; NP_001177258; NP_001680	NP_001288650; NP_001288651; NP_778180
Location (UCSC)	Chr 2: 175.18 – 175.18 Mb	Chr 2: 73.74 – 73.74 Mb
PubMed search
- Wikidata
View/Edit Human	View/Edit Mouse

The ATP5MC3 gene is one of three human paralogs that encode membrane subunit c of the mitochondrial ATP synthase.

This gene encodes a subunit of mitochondrial ATP synthase. Mitochondrial ATP synthase catalyzes ATP synthesis, utilizing an electrochemical gradient of protons across the inner membrane during oxidative phosphorylation. ATP synthase is composed of two linked multi-subunit complexes: the soluble catalytic core, F1, and the membrane-spanning component, Fo, comprising the proton channel. The catalytic portion of mitochondrial ATP synthase consists of 5 different subunits (alpha, beta, gamma, delta, and epsilon) assembled with a stoichiometry of 3 alpha, 3 beta, and a single representative of the other 3. The proton channel seems to have nine subunits (a, b, c, d, e, f, g, F6 and 8). This gene is one of three genes that encode subunit c of the proton channel. Each of the three genes have distinct mitochondrial import sequences but encode the identical mature protein. Alternatively spliced transcript variants encoding the same protein have been identified.
