= ATP5PO =

Protein-coding gene in the species Homo sapiens

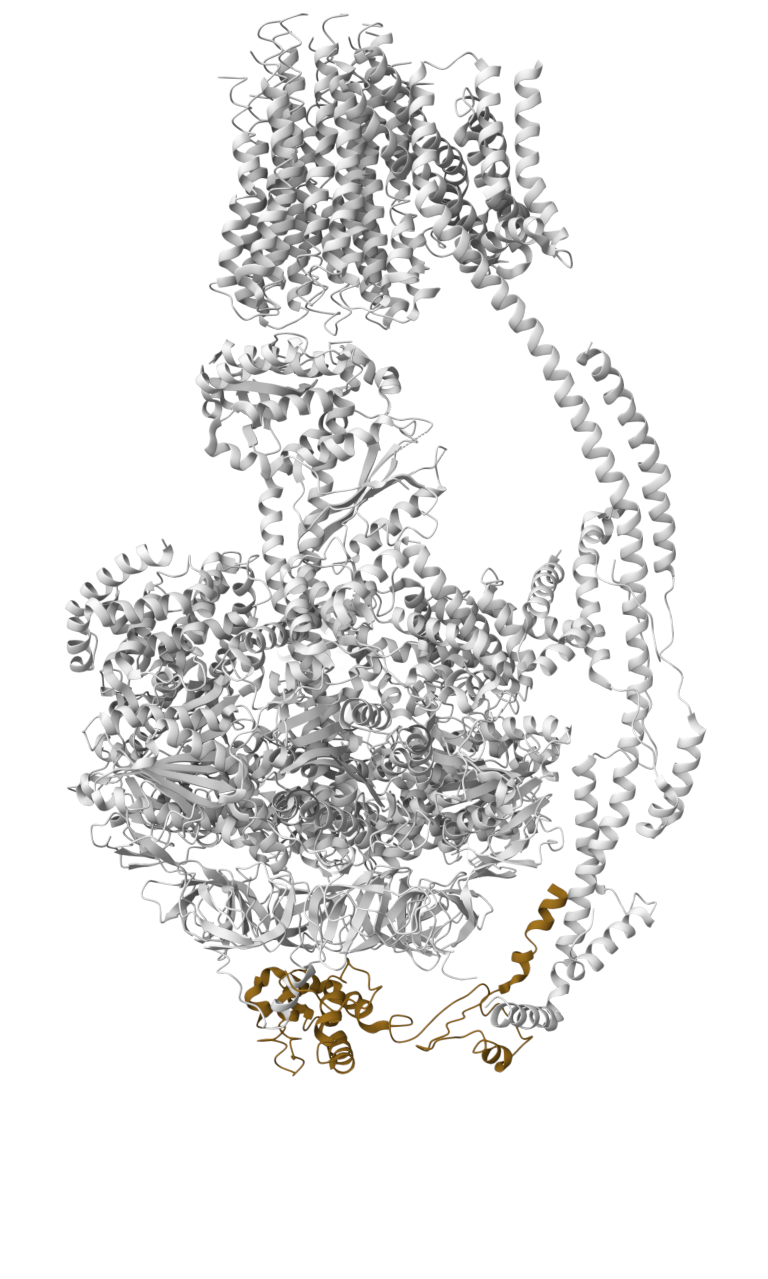

Identifiers
- Aliases: ATP5PO, ATPO, OSCP, HMC08D05, ATP synthase, H+ transporting, mitochondrial F1 complex, O subunit, ATP synthase peripheral stalk subunit OSCP, ATP5O
- External IDs: OMIM: 600828; MGI: 106341; GeneCards: ATP5PO

Gene location (Human)
Chr.	Chromosome 21 (human)
Band	21q22.11	Start	33,903,453 bp
Band	21q22.11	End	33,915,814 bp

Gene location (Mouse)
Chr.	Chromosome 16 (mouse)
Band	16|16 C4	Start	91,722,102 bp
Band	16|16 C4	End	91,728,575 bp
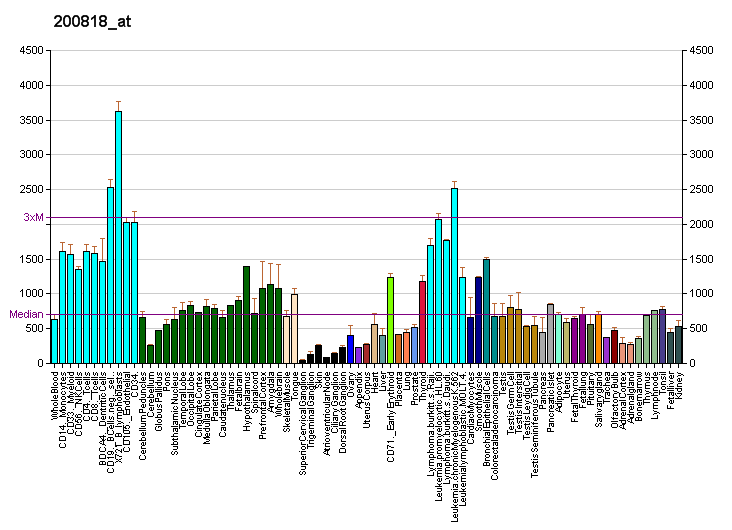
RNA expression pattern
Bgee	Human / Mouse (ortholog); Top expressed in: left ventricle; apex of heart; right auricle of heart; ganglionic eminence; gastrocnemius muscle; mucosa of transverse colon; muscle of thigh; rectum; dorsolateral prefrontal cortex; body of stomach / Top expressed in: endocardial cushion; atrioventricular valve; myocardium of ventricle; muscle of thigh; intercostal muscle; yolk sac; soleus muscle; spermatocyte; right kidney; atrium; More reference expression data
BioGPS	More reference expression data
Gene ontology
Molecular function	proton-transporting ATP synthase activity, rotational mechanism; transmembrane transporter activity; transporter activity; ATPase activity; protein binding
Cellular component	mitochondrial proton-transporting ATP synthase complex; membrane; plasma membrane; mitochondrion; mitochondrial inner membrane; extracellular exosome; nucleus; extracellular matrix
Biological process	mitochondrial ATP synthesis coupled proton transport; ion transport; ATP synthesis coupled proton transport; ATP biosynthetic process; cristae formation; transport; proton transmembrane transport
Sources:Amigo / QuickGO
Orthologs
Databases	NCBI: entry; OMA: entry
Species	Human	Mouse
Entrez	539	28080
Ensembl	ENSG00000241837	ENSMUSG00000022956
UniProt	P48047	Q9DB20
RefSeq (mRNA)	NM_001697	NM_138597
RefSeq (protein)	NP_001688	NP_613063
Location (UCSC)	Chr 21: 33.9 – 33.92 Mb	Chr 16: 91.72 – 91.73 Mb
PubMed search
- Wikidata
View/Edit Human	View/Edit Mouse

ATP synthase peripheral stalk subunit OSCP, mitochondrial is an enzyme that in humans is encoded by the ATP5PO gene.

The protein encoded by this gene is a component of the F-type ATPase found in the mitochondrial matrix. F-type ATPases are composed of a catalytic core and a membrane proton channel. The encoded protein appears to be part of the connector linking these two components and may be involved in transmission of conformational changes or proton conductance.
