= ATP5ME =

Protein-coding gene in the species Homo sapiens

Identifiers
- Aliases: ATP5ME, ATP5K, ATP synthase, H+ transporting, mitochondrial Fo complex subunit E, ATP synthase membrane subunit e, ATP5I
- External IDs: OMIM: 601519; GeneCards: ATP5ME

Gene location (Human)
Chr.	Chromosome 4 (human)
Band	4p16.3	Start	672,436 bp
Band	4p16.3	End	674,330 bp
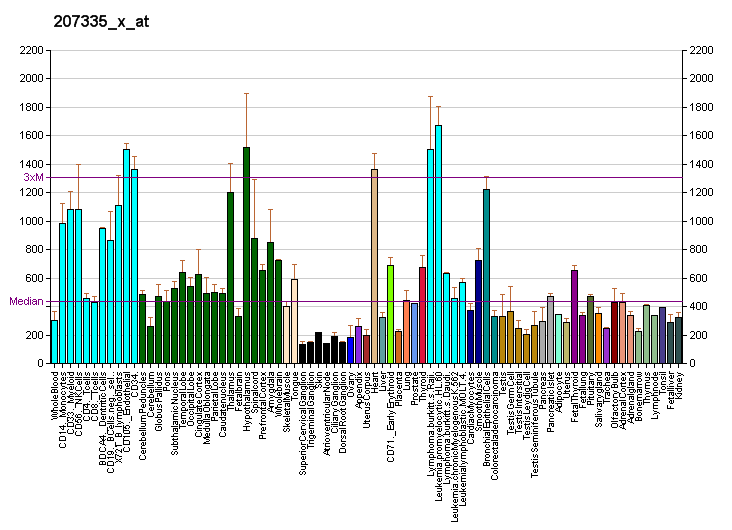

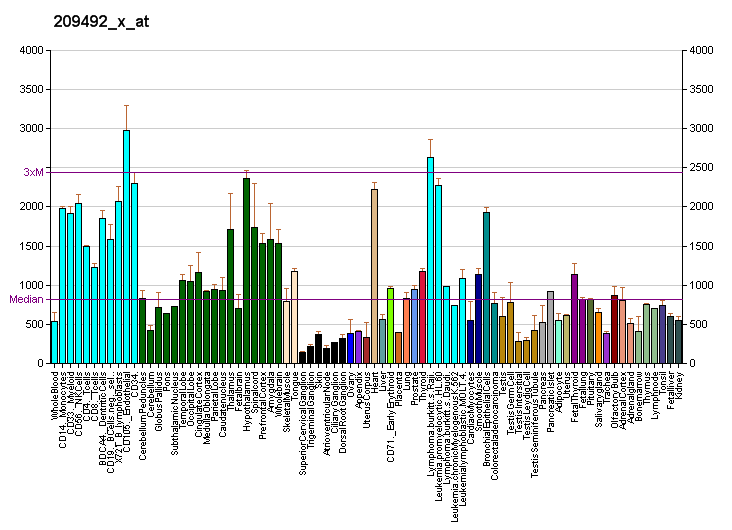
RNA expression pattern
Bgee	Human / Mouse (ortholog); Top expressed in: apex of heart; left ventricle; right auricle of heart; mucosa of transverse colon; tendon of biceps brachii; C1 segment; Brodmann area 9; internal globus pallidus; right ventricle; muscle of thigh / n/a; More reference expression data
BioGPS	More reference expression data
Gene ontology
Molecular function	ATPase activity; transmembrane transporter activity; proton transmembrane transporter activity; protein-containing complex binding
Cellular component	mitochondrial inner membrane; mitochondrial proton-transporting ATP synthase complex, coupling factor F(o); mitochondrial proton-transporting ATP synthase complex; mitochondrion; membrane; proton-transporting ATP synthase complex, coupling factor F(o)
Biological process	ATP metabolic process; mitochondrial ATP synthesis coupled proton transport; ATP synthesis coupled proton transport; ion transport; ATP biosynthetic process; cristae formation
Sources:Amigo / QuickGO
Orthologs
Databases	NCBI: entry; OMA: entry
Species	Human	Mouse
Entrez	521	n/a
Ensembl	ENSG00000169020	n/a
UniProt	P56385	n/a
RefSeq (mRNA)	NM_007100	n/a
RefSeq (protein)	NP_009031	n/a
Location (UCSC)	Chr 4: 0.67 – 0.67 Mb	n/a
PubMed search		n/a
- Wikidata
View/Edit Human

ATP synthase E chain

Identifiers
- Symbol: ATP-synt_E
- Pfam: PF05680
- InterPro: IPR008386
- SCOP2: 1e79 / SCOPe / SUPFAM
Available protein structures:
- PDB: IPR008386 PF05680 (ECOD; PDBsum)
- AlphaFold: IPR008386; PF05680

ATP synthase subunit e, mitochondrial is an enzyme that in humans is encoded by the ATP5ME gene.

Mitochondrial ATP synthase catalyzes ATP synthesis, utilizing an electrochemical gradient of protons across the inner membrane during oxidative phosphorylation. It is composed of two linked multi-subunit complexes: the soluble catalytic core, F1, and the membrane-spanning component, Fo, which comprises the proton channel. The F1 complex consists of 5 different subunits (alpha, beta, gamma, delta, and epsilon) assembled in a ratio of 3 alpha, 3 beta, and a single representative of the other 3. The Fo seems to have nine subunits (a, b, c, d, e, f, g, F6 and 8). This gene encodes the e subunit of the Fo complex.

In yeast, the F_{O} complex E subunit appears to play an important role in supporting F-ATPase dimerisation. This subunit is anchored to the inner mitochondrial membrane via its N-terminal region, which is involved in stabilising subunits G and K of the F_{O} complex. The C-terminal region of subunit E is hydrophilic, protruding into the intermembrane space where it can also help stabilise the F-ATPase dimer complex.
