= ATP5MF =

Protein-coding gene in the species Homo sapiens

Identifiers
- Aliases: ATP5MF, ATP5JL, ATP synthase, H+ transporting, mitochondrial Fo complex subunit F2, ATP5J2, ATP synthase membrane subunit f
- External IDs: MGI: 1927558; GeneCards: ATP5MF

Gene location (Human)
Chr.	Chromosome 7 (human)
Band	7q22.1	Start	99,448,475 bp
Band	7q22.1	End	99,466,186 bp

Gene location (Mouse)
Chr.	Chromosome 5 (mouse)
Band	5|5 G2	Start	145,120,508 bp
Band	5|5 G2	End	145,128,872 bp
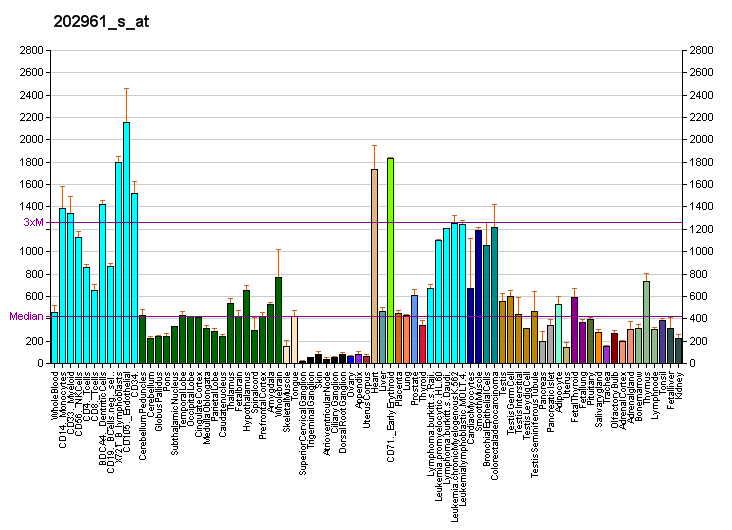
RNA expression pattern
Bgee	Human / Mouse (ortholog); Top expressed in: apex of heart; right testis; left testis; mucosa of transverse colon; muscle of thigh; right frontal lobe; right auricle of heart; prefrontal cortex; left ventricle; ganglionic eminence / Top expressed in: atrioventricular valve; endocardial cushion; intercostal muscle; myocardium of ventricle; cardiac muscles; digastric muscle; extraocular muscle; soleus muscle; thoracic diaphragm; sternocleidomastoid muscle; More reference expression data
BioGPS	More reference expression data
Gene ontology
Molecular function	ATPase activity; transmembrane transporter activity
Cellular component	integral component of membrane; mitochondrial inner membrane; mitochondrial proton-transporting ATP synthase complex, coupling factor F(o); mitochondrial proton-transporting ATP synthase complex; extracellular exosome; nucleus; membrane; proton-transporting ATP synthase complex, coupling factor F(o); nucleoplasm; mitochondrion
Biological process	ATP metabolic process; mitochondrial ATP synthesis coupled proton transport; ion transport; ATP biosynthetic process; cristae formation; transport; proton transmembrane transport
Sources:Amigo / QuickGO
Orthologs
Databases	NCBI: entry; OMA: entry
Species	Human	Mouse
Entrez	9551	57423
Ensembl	ENSG00000241468	ENSMUSG00000038690
UniProt	P56134	P56135
RefSeq (mRNA)	NM_004889; NM_001003713; NM_001003714; NM_001039178; NM_001190353 NM_001190354	NM_020582
RefSeq (protein)	NP_001003713; NP_001003714; NP_001034267; NP_004880	NP_065607
Location (UCSC)	Chr 7: 99.45 – 99.47 Mb	Chr 5: 145.12 – 145.13 Mb
PubMed search
- Wikidata
View/Edit Human	View/Edit Mouse

The ATP5MF gene encodes the ATP synthase subunit f, mitochondrial enzyme in humans.

== Function ==
Mitochondrial ATP synthase catalyzes ATP synthesis, utilizing an electrochemical gradient of protons across the inner membrane during oxidative phosphorylation. It is composed of two linked multi-subunit complexes: the soluble catalytic core, F1, and the membrane-spanning component, Fo, which comprises the proton channel. The catalytic portion of mitochondrial ATP synthase consists of 5 different subunits (alpha, beta, gamma, delta, and epsilon) assembled with a stoichiometry of 3 alpha, 3 beta, and single representatives of the gamma, delta, and epsilon subunits. The proton channel likely has nine subunits (a, b, c, d, e, f, g, F6 and 8). This gene encodes the f subunit of the Fo complex. Alternatively spliced transcript variants encoding different isoforms have been identified for this gene.
