= ATP5F1B =

Protein-coding gene in humans

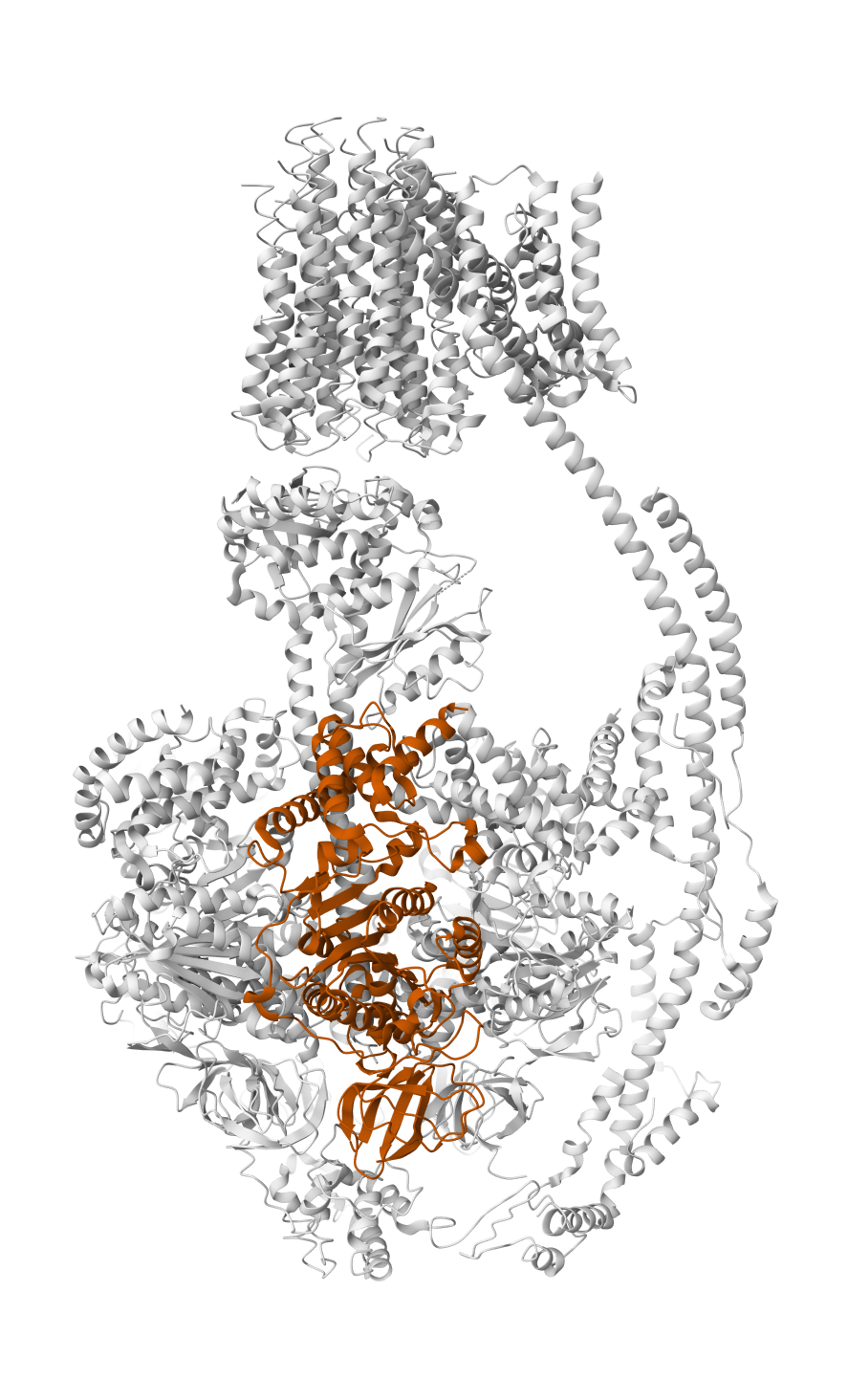

Identifiers
- Aliases: ATP5F1B, ATPMB, ATPSB, HEL-S-271, ATP synthase, H+ transporting, mitochondrial F1 complex, beta polypeptide, ATP synthase F1 subunit beta, ATP5B
- External IDs: OMIM: 102910; MGI: 107801; GeneCards: ATP5F1B
Enzyme activity
EC #	BRENDA	ExPASy	KEGG	MetaCyc
7.1.2.2	↗	↗	↗	↗

Gene location (Human)
Chr.	Chromosome 12 (human)
Band	12q13.3	Start	56,638,175 bp
Band	12q13.3	End	56,645,984 bp

Gene location (Mouse)
Chr.	Chromosome 10 (mouse)
Band	10|10 D3	Start	127,919,142 bp
Band	10|10 D3	End	127,926,260 bp
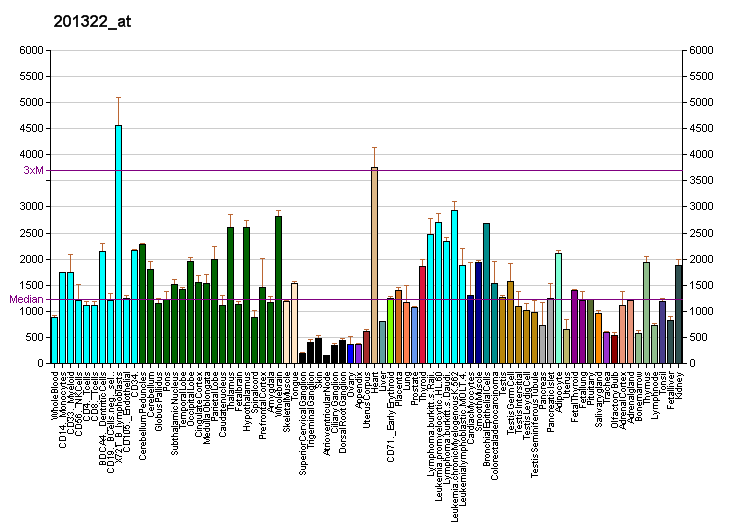

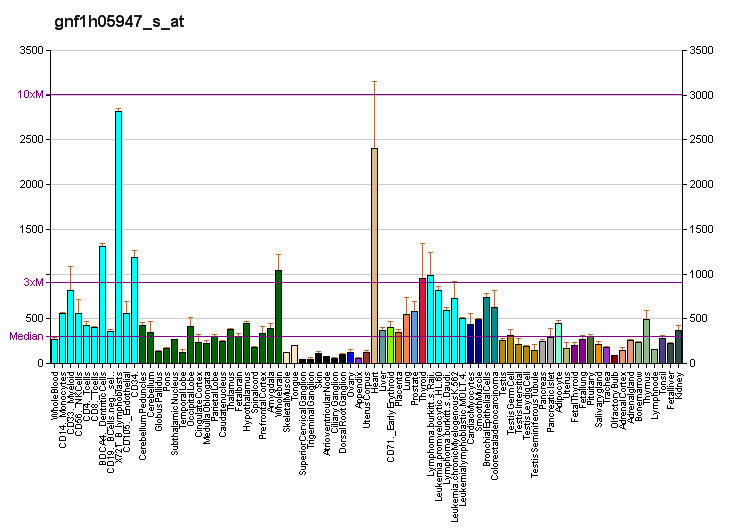
RNA expression pattern
Bgee	Human / Mouse (ortholog); Top expressed in: apex of heart; left ventricle; right auricle of heart; right ventricle; myocardium of left ventricle; mucosa of transverse colon; cerebellar cortex; right hemisphere of cerebellum; muscle of thigh; gastrocnemius muscle / Top expressed in: right kidney; dentate gyrus of hippocampal formation granule cell; myocardium of ventricle; right ventricle; atrium; central gray substance of midbrain; mandibular prominence; cardiac muscles; human kidney; maxillary prominence; More reference expression data
BioGPS	More reference expression data
Gene ontology
Molecular function	nucleotide binding; transmembrane transporter activity; transporter activity; proton-transporting ATPase activity, rotational mechanism; ATPase activity; protein binding; MHC class I protein binding; hydrolase activity; ATP binding; angiostatin binding; proton-transporting ATP synthase activity, rotational mechanism
Cellular component	mitochondrial proton-transporting ATP synthase complex; membrane; mitochondrial membranes; myelin sheath; plasma membrane; cell surface; mitochondrial matrix; mitochondrial proton-transporting ATP synthase, catalytic core; mitochondrion; mitochondrial inner membrane; proton-transporting ATP synthase complex, catalytic core F(1); mitochondrial nucleoid; extracellular exosome; nucleus; extracellular matrix; proton-transporting ATP synthase complex; proton-transporting two-sector ATPase complex, catalytic domain
Biological process	lipid metabolism; mitochondrial ATP synthesis coupled proton transport; mitochondrion organization; regulation of intracellular pH; ion transport; generation of precursor metabolites and energy; negative regulation of cell adhesion involved in substrate-bound cell migration; ATP metabolic process; angiogenesis; osteoblast differentiation; ATP synthesis coupled proton transport; ATP biosynthetic process; cristae formation; positive regulation of blood vessel endothelial cell migration; transport; cellular response to interleukin-7; proton transmembrane transport
Sources:Amigo / QuickGO
Orthologs
Databases	NCBI: entry; OMA: entry
Species	Human	Mouse
Entrez	506	11947
Ensembl	ENSG00000110955	ENSMUSG00000025393
UniProt	P06576	P56480
RefSeq (mRNA)	NM_001686	NM_016774
RefSeq (protein)	NP_001677	NP_058054
Location (UCSC)	Chr 12: 56.64 – 56.65 Mb	Chr 10: 127.92 – 127.93 Mb
PubMed search
- Wikidata
View/Edit Human	View/Edit Mouse

ATP synthase F1 subunit beta, mitochondrial is an enzyme that in humans is encoded by the ATP5F1B gene.

== Function ==
This gene encodes a subunit of mitochondrial ATP synthase. Mitochondrial ATP synthase catalyzes ATP synthesis, utilizing an electrochemical gradient of protons across the inner membrane during oxidative phosphorylation. ATP synthase is composed of two linked multi-subunit complexes: the soluble catalytic core, F1, and the membrane-spanning component, Fo, comprising the proton channel. The catalytic portion of mitochondrial ATP synthase consists of 5 different subunits (alpha, beta, gamma, delta, and epsilon) assembled with a stoichiometry of 3 alpha, 3 beta, and a single representative of the other 3. The proton channel consists of three main subunits (a, b, c). This gene encodes the beta subunit of the catalytic core.
