= ATP5PD =

Protein-coding gene in the species Homo sapiens

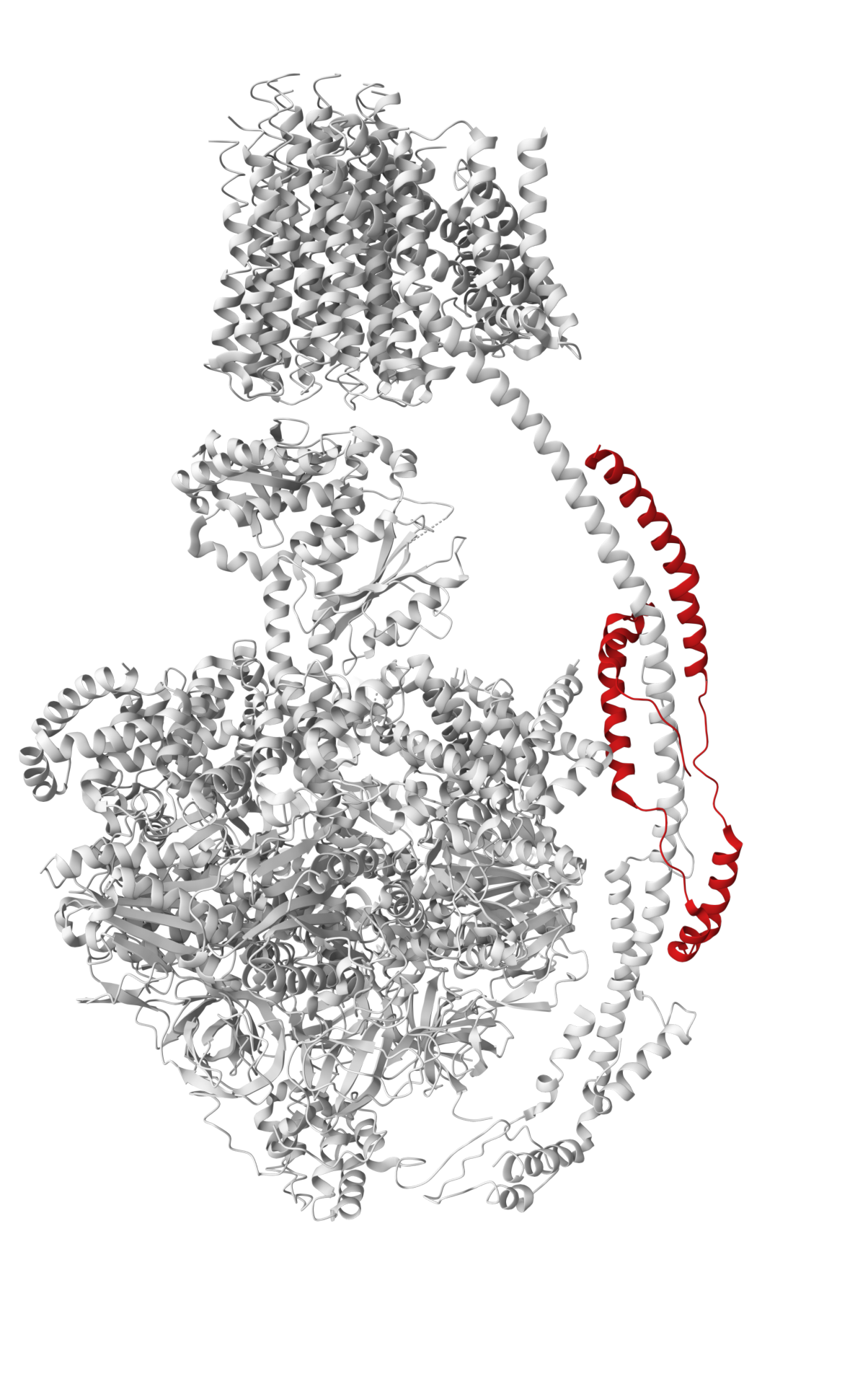

Identifiers
- Aliases: ATP5PD, ATPQ, ATP synthase, H+ transporting, mitochondrial Fo complex subunit D, ATP5H, ATP synthase peripheral stalk subunit d, APT5H
- External IDs: OMIM: 618121; MGI: 1918929; GeneCards: ATP5PD

Gene location (Human)
Chr.	Chromosome 17 (human)
Band	17q25.1	Start	75,038,863 bp
Band	17q25.1	End	75,046,985 bp

Gene location (Mouse)
Chr.	Chromosome 11 (mouse)
Band	11|11 E2	Start	115,306,515 bp
Band	11|11 E2	End	115,310,788 bp
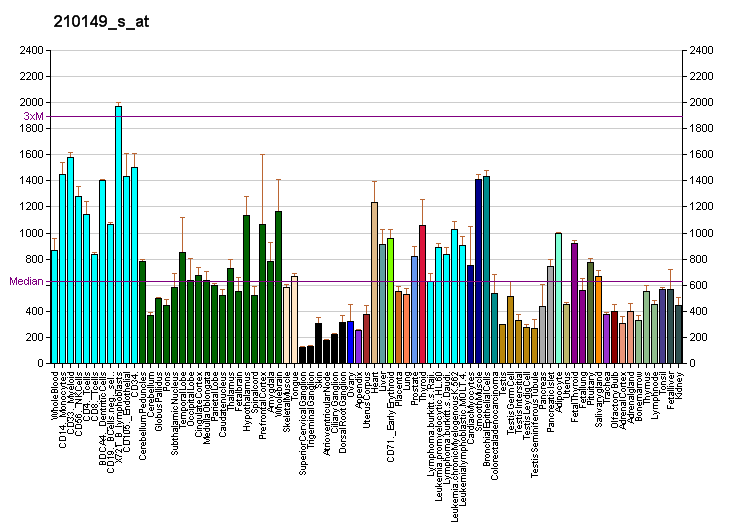
RNA expression pattern
Bgee	Human / Mouse (ortholog); Top expressed in: right ventricle; myocardium; myocardium of left ventricle; atrium; right auricle of heart; Skeletal muscle tissue of biceps brachii; cardiac muscle tissue of right atrium; apex of heart; body of tongue; Skeletal muscle tissue of rectus abdominis / Top expressed in: heart; cerebellar cortex; muscle tissue; skeletal muscle tissue; right kidney; muscle of thigh; human kidney; quadriceps femoris muscle; olfactory bulb; neural tube; More reference expression data
BioGPS	More reference expression data
Gene ontology
Molecular function	ATPase activity; transmembrane transporter activity; proton transmembrane transporter activity; proton-transporting ATP synthase activity, rotational mechanism; protein binding; protein-containing complex binding
Cellular component	mitochondrial inner membrane; mitochondrial proton-transporting ATP synthase complex, coupling factor F(o); mitochondrial proton-transporting ATP synthase complex; mitochondrion; extracellular exosome; membrane; nucleoplasm; proton-transporting ATP synthase complex, coupling factor F(o); mitochondrial proton-transporting ATP synthase, stator stalk; cytosol
Biological process	mitochondrial ATP synthesis coupled proton transport; ion transport; ATP synthesis coupled proton transport; ATP biosynthetic process; cristae formation; transport; ATP metabolic process; cellular response to peptide
Sources:Amigo / QuickGO
Orthologs
Databases	NCBI: entry; OMA: entry
Species	Human	Mouse
Entrez	10476	71679
Ensembl	ENSG00000167863	ENSMUSG00000034566
UniProt	O75947	Q9DCX2
RefSeq (mRNA)	NM_006356; NM_001003785	NM_027862
RefSeq (protein)	NP_001003785; NP_006347	NP_082138
Location (UCSC)	Chr 17: 75.04 – 75.05 Mb	Chr 11: 115.31 – 115.31 Mb
PubMed search
- Wikidata
View/Edit Human	View/Edit Mouse

ATP synthase D chain, mitochondrial

Identifiers
- Symbol: ATP5H
- Pfam: PF05873
Available protein structures:
- PDB: PF05873 (ECOD; PDBsum)
- AlphaFold: PF05873

The human gene ATP5PD encodes subunit d of the peripheral stalk part of the enzyme mitochondrial ATP synthase.

Mitochondrial ATP synthase catalyzes ATP synthesis, utilizing an electrochemical gradient of protons across the inner membrane during oxidative phosphorylation. It is composed of two linked multi-subunit complexes: the soluble catalytic core, F_{1}, and the membrane-spanning component, F_{0}, which comprises the proton channel. The F_{1} complex consists of 5 different subunits (alpha, beta, gamma, delta, and epsilon) assembled in a ratio of 3 alpha, 3 beta, and a single representative of the other 3. The F_{o} seems to have nine subunits (a, b, c, d, e, f, g, F6 and 8). This gene encodes the d subunit of the F_{o} complex. Alternatively spliced transcript variants encoding different isoforms have been identified for this gene. In addition, three pseudogenes are located on chromosomes 9, 12 and 15.
