= ATP5F1 =

Protein-coding gene in humans

ATP5PB
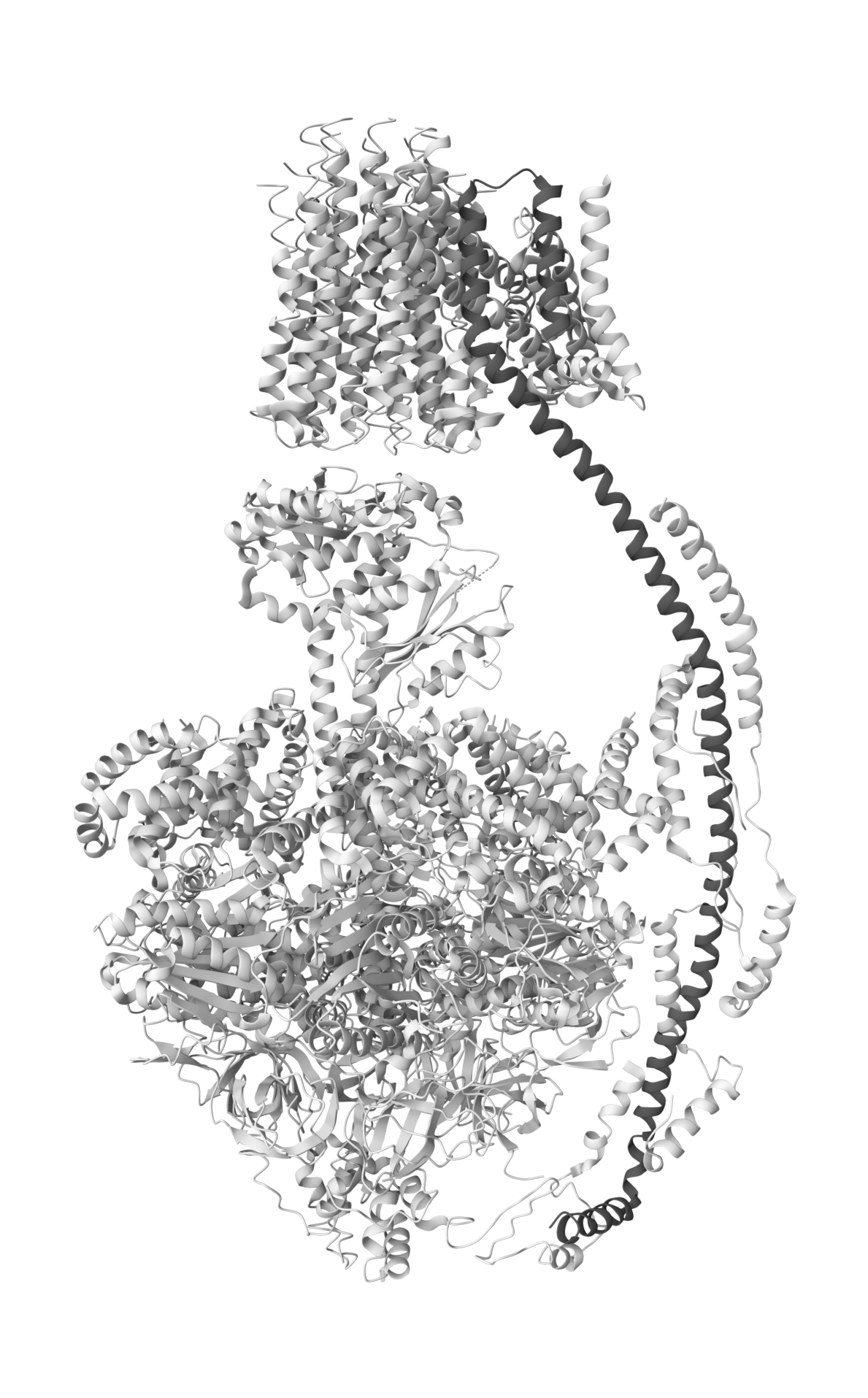

Identifiers
- Aliases: ATP5PB, PIG47, ATP synthase, H+ transporting, mitochondrial Fo complex subunit B1, ATP synthase peripheral stalk-membrane subunit b, ATP5F1
- External IDs: OMIM: 603270; MGI: 1100495; GeneCards: ATP5PB

Gene location (Human)
Chr.	Chromosome 1 (human)
Band	1p13.2	Start	111,448,864 bp
Band	1p13.2	End	111,462,773 bp

Gene location (Mouse)
Chr.	Chromosome 3 (mouse)
Band	3 F2.2|3 46.46 cM	Start	105,850,014 bp
Band	3 F2.2|3 46.46 cM	End	105,867,415 bp
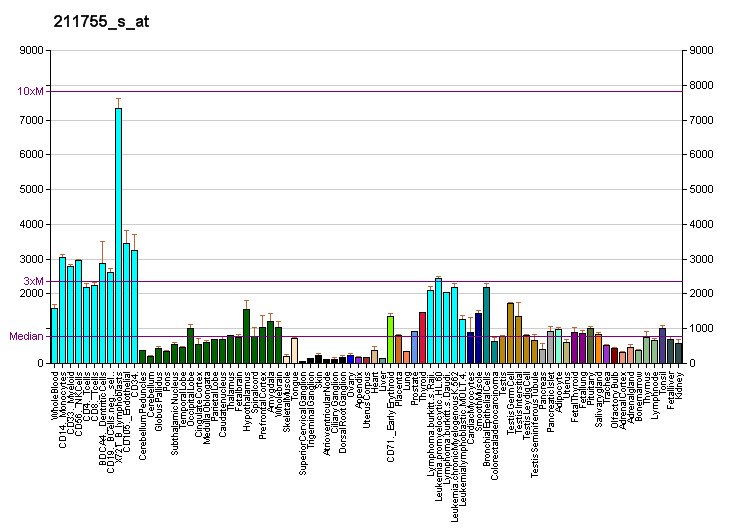
RNA expression pattern
Bgee	Human / Mouse (ortholog); Top expressed in: right ventricle; mucosa of sigmoid colon; palpebral conjunctiva; Epithelium of choroid plexus; biceps brachii; jejunal mucosa; Skeletal muscle tissue of biceps brachii; germinal epithelium; oral cavity; kidney tubule / Top expressed in: epithelium of small intestine; myocardium of ventricle; intercostal muscle; soleus muscle; atrioventricular valve; medial ganglionic eminence; vas deferens; atrium; digastric muscle; endocardial cushion; More reference expression data
BioGPS	More reference expression data
Gene ontology
Molecular function	protein binding; ATPase activity; proton transmembrane transporter activity; proton-transporting ATP synthase activity, rotational mechanism; transmembrane transporter activity
Cellular component	nucleoplasm; mitochondrion; mitochondrial proton-transporting ATP synthase complex, coupling factor F(o); mitochondrial matrix; proton-transporting ATP synthase complex, coupling factor F(o); nucleus; membrane; myelin sheath; mitochondrial proton-transporting ATP synthase complex; mitochondrial inner membrane; extracellular exosome
Biological process	substantia nigra development; ion transport; ATP synthesis coupled proton transport; mitochondrial ATP synthesis coupled proton transport; ATP biosynthetic process; cristae formation; transport
Sources:Amigo / QuickGO
Orthologs
Databases	NCBI: entry; OMA: entry
Species	Human	Mouse
Entrez	515	11950
Ensembl	ENSG00000116459	ENSMUSG00000000563
UniProt	P24539	Q9CQQ7
RefSeq (mRNA)	NM_001688; NM_001002014; NM_001002015	NM_009725; NM_001304719
RefSeq (protein)	NP_001679	NP_001291648; NP_033855
Location (UCSC)	Chr 1: 111.45 – 111.46 Mb	Chr 3: 105.85 – 105.87 Mb
PubMed search
- Wikidata
View/Edit Human	View/Edit Mouse

ATP-synt_B
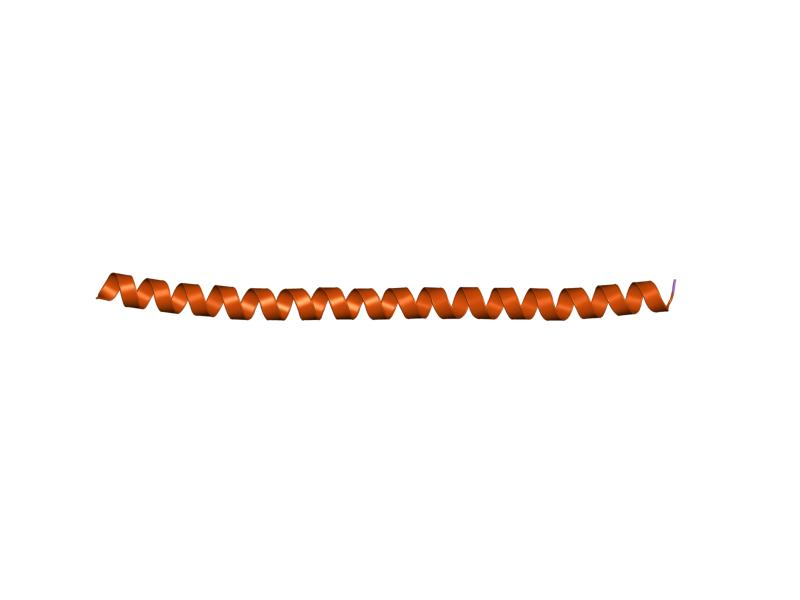
- atp synthase b subunit dimerization domain

Identifiers
- Symbol: ATP-synt_B
- Pfam: PF00430
- Pfam clan: CL0255
- InterPro: IPR002146
- SCOP2: 1b9u / SCOPe / SUPFAM
Available protein structures:
- PDB: IPR002146 PF00430 (ECOD; PDBsum)
- AlphaFold: IPR002146; PF00430

ATP synthase peripheral stalk subunit b, mitochondrial is an enzyme that in humans is encoded by the ATP5PB gene.

This gene encodes a subunit of mitochondrial ATP synthase. Mitochondrial ATP synthase catalyzes ATP synthesis, utilizing an electrochemical gradient of protons across the inner membrane during oxidative phosphorylation. ATP synthase is composed of two linked multi-subunit complexes: the soluble catalytic core, F1, and the membrane-spanning component, Fo, comprising the proton channel. The catalytic portion of mitochondrial ATP synthase consists of 5 different subunits (alpha, beta, gamma, delta, and epsilon) assembled with a stoichiometry of 3 alpha, 3 beta, and a single representative of the other 3. The proton channel seems to have nine subunits (a, b, c, d, e, f, g, F6 and 8). This gene encodes the b subunit of the proton channel.

The b subunits are part of the peripheral stalk that links the F1 and FO complexes together, and which acts as a stator to prevent certain subunits from rotating with the central rotary element. The peripheral stalk differs in subunit composition between mitochondrial, chloroplast and bacterial F-ATPases. In bacterial and chloroplast F-ATPases, the peripheral stalk is composed of one copy of the delta subunit (homologous to OSCP in mitochondria), and two copies of subunit b in bacteria, or one copy each of subunits b and b' in chloroplasts and photosynthetic bacteria.
