= ATP5MC1 =

Protein-coding gene in the species Homo sapiens

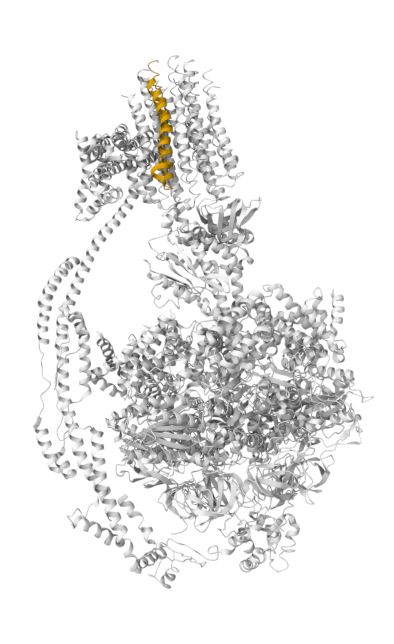

Identifiers
- Aliases: ATP5MC1, ATP5A, ATP5G, ATP synthase, H+ transporting, mitochondrial Fo complex subunit C1 (subunit 9), ATP synthase membrane subunit c locus 1, ATP5G1
- External IDs: OMIM: 603192; MGI: 107653; GeneCards: ATP5MC1

Gene location (Human)
Chr.	Chromosome 17 (human)
Band	17q21.32	Start	48,892,765 bp
Band	17q21.32	End	48,895,871 bp

Gene location (Mouse)
Chr.	Chromosome 11 (mouse)
Band	11|11 D	Start	95,959,678 bp
Band	11|11 D	End	95,966,496 bp
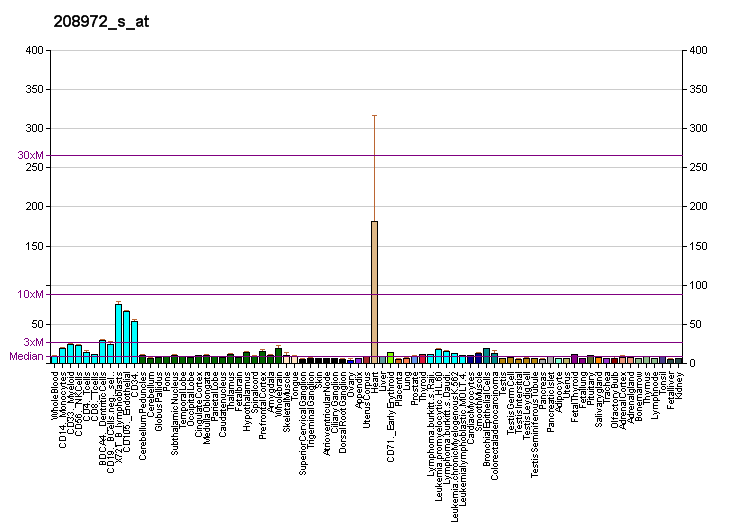
RNA expression pattern
Bgee	Human / Mouse (ortholog); Top expressed in: apex of heart; mucosa of transverse colon; right auricle of heart; rectum; left ventricle; muscle of thigh; gastrocnemius muscle; body of stomach; right frontal lobe; prefrontal cortex / Top expressed in: right kidney; muscle of thigh; blastocyst; morula; lip; superior frontal gyrus; yolk sac; primary visual cortex; dentate gyrus of hippocampal formation granule cell; embryo; More reference expression data
BioGPS	More reference expression data
Gene ontology
Molecular function	lipid binding; transporter activity; proton transmembrane transporter activity; protein binding; proton-transporting ATP synthase activity, rotational mechanism
Cellular component	proton-transporting ATP synthase complex, coupling factor F(o); membrane; integral component of membrane; mitochondrion; mitochondrial membranes; proton-transporting two-sector ATPase complex, proton-transporting domain; mitochondrial proton-transporting ATP synthase complex; mitochondrial proton-transporting ATP synthase complex, coupling factor F(o); mitochondrial inner membrane
Biological process	ion transport; ATP biosynthetic process; ATP synthesis coupled proton transport; cristae formation; mitochondrial ATP synthesis coupled proton transport
Sources:Amigo / QuickGO
Orthologs
Databases	NCBI: entry; OMA: entry
Species	Human	Mouse
Entrez	516	11951
Ensembl	ENSG00000159199	ENSMUSG00000006057
UniProt	P05496	Q9CR84
RefSeq (mRNA)	NM_005175; NM_001002027	NM_001161419; NM_007506
RefSeq (protein)	NP_001002027; NP_005166	NP_001154891; NP_031532
Location (UCSC)	Chr 17: 48.89 – 48.9 Mb	Chr 11: 95.96 – 95.97 Mb
PubMed search
- Wikidata
View/Edit Human	View/Edit Mouse

The ATP5MC1 gene is one of three human paralogs that encode membrane subunit c of the mitochondrial ATP synthase.

== Function ==
This gene encodes a subunit of mitochondrial ATP synthase. Mitochondrial ATP synthase catalyzes ATP synthesis, utilizing an electrochemical gradient of protons across the inner membrane during oxidative phosphorylation. ATP synthase is composed of two linked multi-subunit complexes: the soluble catalytic core, F1, and the membrane-spanning component, Fo, comprising the proton channel. The catalytic portion of mitochondrial ATP synthase consists of 5 different subunits (alpha, beta, gamma, delta, and epsilon) assembled with a stoichiometry of 3 alpha, 3 beta, and a single representative of the other 3. The proton channel seems to have nine subunits (a, b, c, d, e, f, g, F6 and 8). This gene is one of three genes that encode subunit c of the proton channel. Each of the three genes have distinct mitochondrial import sequences but encode the identical mature protein. Alternatively spliced transcript variants encoding the same protein have been identified.
