= MT-ATP6 =

Mitochondrial protein-coding gene whose product is involved in ATP synthesis

ATP6
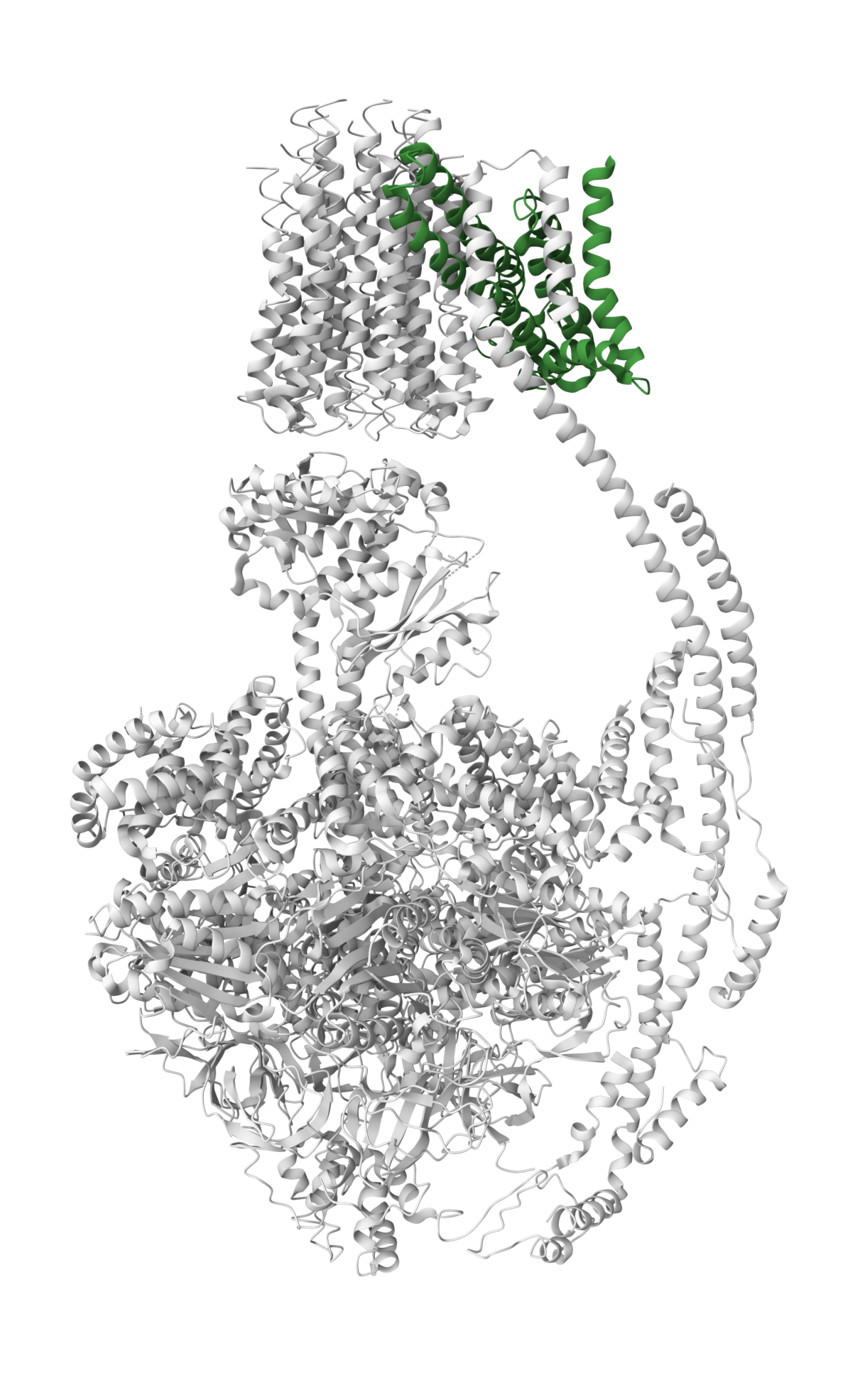

Identifiers
- Aliases: ATP6, ATPase6, MTATP synthase Fo subunit 6
- External IDs: OMIM: 516060; MGI: 99927; GeneCards: ATP6
Gene location (Human)
Chr.	Mitochondrial DNA (human)
Band	n/a	Start	8,527 bp
Band	n/a	End	9,207 bp
Gene location (Mouse)
Chr.	Mitochondrial DNA (mouse)
Band	n/a	Start	7,927 bp
Band	n/a	End	8,607 bp
RNA expression pattern
Bgee	Human / Mouse (ortholog); Top expressed in: left uterine tube; gastric mucosa; Descending thoracic aorta; right hemisphere of cerebellum; body of uterus; mucosa of transverse colon; prostate; right ovary; right lung; muscle layer of sigmoid colon / Top expressed in: epiblast; primary visual cortex; superior frontal gyrus; cerebellar cortex; muscle of thigh; renal cortex; proximal tubule; ventricular zone; ganglionic eminence; right kidney; More reference expression data
BioGPS	n/a
Gene ontology
Molecular function	ATPase activity; transmembrane transporter activity; proton transmembrane transporter activity; protein binding; proton-transporting ATP synthase activity, rotational mechanism
Cellular component	integral component of membrane; mitochondrial inner membrane; mitochondrial proton-transporting ATP synthase complex; mitochondrion; membrane; proton-transporting ATP synthase complex, coupling factor F(o); proton-transporting ATP synthase complex
Biological process	response to hyperoxia; mitochondrial ATP synthesis coupled proton transport; ageing; ATP synthesis coupled proton transport; ion transport; ATP biosynthetic process; cristae formation
Sources:Amigo / QuickGO
Orthologs
Databases	NCBI: entry; OMA: entry
Species	Human	Mouse
Entrez	4508	17705
Ensembl	ENSG00000198899	ENSMUSG00000064357
UniProt	P00846	P00848
RefSeq (mRNA)	n/a	n/a
RefSeq (protein)	n/a	NP_904333
Location (UCSC)	Chr M: 0.01 – 0.01 Mb	Chr M: 0.01 – 0.01 Mb
PubMed search
- Wikidata
View/Edit Human	View/Edit Mouse

The 46-nucleotide overlap in the reading frames of the human mitochondrial genes MT-ATP6 and MT-ATP8. For each nucleotide triplet (square brackets), the corresponding amino acid is given (one-letter code), either in the +3 frame for MT-ATP6 (in blue) or in the +1 frame for MT-ATP8 (in red).

MT-ATP6 (or ATP6) is a mitochondrial gene with the full name 'mitochondrially encoded ATP synthase membrane subunit 6' that encodes the ATP synthase F_{o} subunit 6 (or subunit/chain A). This subunit belongs to the F_{o} complex of the large, transmembrane F-type ATP synthase. This enzyme, which is also known as complex V, is responsible for the final step of oxidative phosphorylation in the electron transport chain. Specifically, one segment of ATP synthase allows positively charged ions, called protons, to flow across a specialized membrane inside mitochondria. Another segment of the enzyme uses the energy created by this proton flow to convert a molecule called adenosine diphosphate (ADP) to ATP. Mutations in the MT-ATP6 gene have been found in approximately 10 to 20 percent of people with Leigh syndrome.

== Structure ==
Location of the MT-ATP6 gene on the L strand of the human mitochondrial genome. MT-ATP6 is one of the two ATP synthase mitochondrial genes (red boxes).

The MT-ATP6 gene provides information for making a protein that is essential for normal mitochondrial function. The human MT-ATP6 gene, located in mitochondrial DNA, is 681 base pairs in length. An unusual feature of MT-ATP6 is the 46-nucleotide gene overlap of its first codons with the end of the MT-ATP8 gene. With respect to the MT-ATP6 reading frame (+3), the MT-ATP8 gene ends in the +1 reading frame with a TAG stop codon.

The MT-ATP6 protein weighs 24.8 kDa and is composed of 226 amino acids. The protein is a subunit of the F_{1}F_{o} ATPase, also known as Complex V, which consists of 14 nuclear- and 2 mitochondrial-encoded subunits. As an A subunit, MT-ATP6 is contained within the non-catalytic, transmembrane F_{o} portion of the complex.

The nomenclature of the enzyme has a long history. The F_{1} fraction derives its name from the term "Fraction 1" and F_{o} (written as a subscript letter "o", not "zero") derives its name from being the binding fraction for oligomycin, a type of naturally-derived antibiotic that is able to inhibit the F_{o} unit of ATP synthase. The F_{o} region of ATP synthase is a proton pore that is embedded in the mitochondrial membrane. It consists of three main subunits A, B, and C, and (in humans) six additional subunits, d, e, f, g, F6, and 8 (or A6L). 3D structure of E. coli homologue of this subunit was modeled based on electron microscopy data (chain M of PDB: 1c17). It forms a transmembrane 4-α-bundle.

== Function ==
This subunit is a key component of the proton channel, and may play a direct role in the translocation of protons across the membrane. Catalysis in the F_{1} complex depends upon the rotation of the central stalk and F_{o} c-ring, which in turn is driven by the flux of protons through the membrane via the interface between the F0 c-ring and subunit A. The peripheral stalk links subunit A to the external surface of the F_{1} domain, and is thought to act as a stator to counter the tendency of subunit A and the F_{1}alpha_{3} beta_{3} catalytic portion to rotate with the central rotary element.

== Clinical significance ==
Mutations to MT-ATP6 and other genes affecting oxidative phosphorylation in the mitochondria have been associated with a variety of neurodegenerative and cardiovascular disorders, including mitochondrial complex V deficiency, Leber's hereditary optic neuropathy (LHON), mitochondrial encephalomyopathy with stroke-like episodes (MELAS), Leigh syndrome, and NARP syndrome. Most of the body's cells contain thousands of mitochondria, each with one or more copies of mitochondrial DNA. The severity of some mitochondrial disorders is associated with the percentage of mitochondria in each cell that has a particular genetic change. People with Leigh syndrome due to a MT-ATP6 gene mutation tend to have a very high percentage of mitochondria with the mutation (from more than 90 percent to 95 percent). The less-severe features of NARP result from a lower percentage of mitochondria with the mutation, typically 70 percent to 90 percent. Because these two conditions result from the same genetic changes and can occur in different members of a single family, researchers believe that they may represent a spectrum of overlapping features instead of two distinct syndromes.

=== Mitochondrial complex V deficiency ===
Mitochondrial complex V deficiency is a shortage (deficiency) or loss of function in complex V of the electron transport chain that can cause a wide variety of signs and symptoms affecting many organs and systems of the body, particularly the nervous system and the heart. The disorder can be life-threatening in infancy or early childhood. Affected individuals may have feeding problems, slow growth, low muscle tone (hypotonia), extreme fatigue (lethargy), and developmental delay. They tend to develop elevated levels of lactic acid in the blood (lactic acidosis), which can cause nausea, vomiting, weakness, and rapid breathing. High levels of ammonia in the blood (hyperammonemia) can also occur in affected individuals, and in some cases result in abnormal brain function (encephalopathy) and damage to other organs. Ataxia, microcephaly, developmental delay and intellectual disability have been observed in patients with a frameshift mutation in MT-ATP6. This causes a C insertion at position 8612 that results in a truncated protein only 36 amino acids long, and two T > C single-nucleotide polymorphisms at positions 8610 and 8614 that result in a homopolymeric cytosine stretch.

Another common feature of mitochondrial complex V deficiency is hypertrophic cardiomyopathy. This condition is characterized by thickening (hypertrophy) of the cardiac muscle that can lead to heart failure. The m.8528T>C mutation occurs in the overlapping region of the MT-ATP6 and MT-ATP8 genes and has been described in multiple patients with infantile cardiomyopathy. This mutation changes the initiation codon in MT-ATP6 to threonine as well as a change from tryptophan to arginine at position 55 of MT-ATP8. Individuals with mitochondrial complex V deficiency may also have a characteristic pattern of facial features, including a high forehead, curved eyebrows, outside corners of the eyes that point downward (downslanting palpebral fissures), a prominent bridge of the nose, low-set ears, thin lips, and a small chin (micrognathia).

=== Leigh syndrome ===
Pathogenic variants of the mitochondrial gene MT-ATP6 are known to cause mtDNA-associated Leigh syndrome, a progressive brain disorder that usually appears in infancy or early childhood. Affected children may experience delayed development, muscle weakness, problems with movement, or difficulty breathing. Other variants known to cause mtDNA-associated Leigh syndrome involve MT-TL1, MT-TK, MT-TW, MT-TV, MT-ND1, MT-ND2, MT-ND3, MT-ND4, MT-ND5, MT-ND6 and MT-CO3. Abnormalities in mitochondrial energy generation result in neurodegenerative disorders like Leigh syndrome, which is characterized by an onset of symptoms between 12 months and three years of age. The symptoms frequently present themselves following a viral infection and include movement disorders and peripheral neuropathy, as well as hypotonia, spasticity and cerebellar ataxia. Roughly half of affected patients die of respiratory or cardiac failure by the age of three. Leigh syndrome is a maternally inherited disorder and its diagnosis is established through genetic testing of the aforementioned mitochondrial genes, including MT-ATP6. MT-ATP6 gene mutations associated with Leigh syndrome change one DNA building block (nucleotide) in the MT-ATP6 gene. The most common genetic change replaces the nucleotide thymine with guanine at position 8993 (written as T8993G). The mutations that cause Leigh syndrome impair the function or stability of the ATP synthase complex, inhibiting ATP production and impairing oxidative phosphorylation. Although the exact mechanism is unclear, researchers believe that impaired oxidative phosphorylation can lead to cell death because of decreased energy available in the cell. Certain tissues that require large amounts of energy, such as the brain, muscles, and heart, seem especially sensitive to decreases in cellular energy. Cell death in the brain likely causes the characteristic changes in the brain seen in Leigh syndrome, which contribute to the signs and symptoms of the condition. Cell death in other sensitive tissues may also contribute to the features of Leigh syndrome. A heteroplasmic T→C MT-ATP6 mutation at position 9185 results in the substitution of a highly conserved leucine to proline at codon 220 and a heteroplasmic T→C missense mutation at position 9191 converted a highly conserved leucine to a proline at position 222 of the polypeptide, leading to a Leigh-type phenotype. The T9185C mutation resulted in a mild and reversible phenotype, with 97% of the patient's muscle and blood samples reflecting the mutation. The T9191C mutation presented a much more severe phenotype that resulted in the death of the patient at 2 years of age.

=== NARP syndrome ===
Some of the mutations of the ATP6 gene that cause Leigh syndrome are also responsible for a similar, but less severe, condition called neuropathy, ataxia, and retinitis pigmentosa (NARP). A small number of mutations in the MT-ATP6 gene have been identified in people with NARP. Each of these mutations changes one nucleotide in the MT-ATP6 gene. As in Leigh syndrome, the most common genetic change associated with NARP replaces the nucleotide thymine with guanine at position 8993 (written as T8993G). The mutations that cause NARP alter the structure or function of ATP synthase, reducing the ability of mitochondria to produce ATP. Although the precise effects of these mutations are unclear, researchers continue to investigate how changes in the MT-ATP6 gene interfere with ATP production and lead to muscle weakness, vision loss, and the other features of NARP.

=== Familial bilateral striatal necrosis ===
A condition called familial bilateral striatal necrosis, which is similar to Leigh syndrome, can also result from changes in the MT-ATP6 gene. In the few reported cases with these mutations, affected children have had delayed development, problems with movement and coordination, weak muscle tone (hypotonia), and an unusually small head size (microcephaly). Researchers have not determined why MT-ATP6 mutations result in this combination of signs and symptoms in children with bilateral striatal necrosis.

== Interactions ==
MT-ATP6 has been shown to have 20 binary protein-protein interactions including 17 co-complex interactions. MT-ATP6 appears to interact with SP1.

== Research ==
The SENS Research Foundation have published a paper detailing the successful allotopic expression of replacement DNA for the MT-ATP6 gene in the cell nuclear DNA.
