= MT-ND2 =

Mitochondrial gene coding for a protein involved in the respiratory chain

Identifiers
- Aliases: MT-ND2, complex I ND2 subunit, NAD2, NADH-ubiquinone oxidoreductase chain 2, NADH dehydrogenase subunit 2, ND2
- External IDs: OMIM: 516001; MGI: 102500; GeneCards: MT-ND2
Enzyme activity
EC #	BRENDA	ExPASy	KEGG	MetaCyc
7.1.1.2	↗	↗	↗	↗
Gene location (Human)
Chr.	Mitochondrial DNA (human)
Band	n/a	Start	4,470 bp
Band	n/a	End	5,511 bp
Gene location (Mouse)
Chr.	Mitochondrial DNA (mouse)
Band	n/a	Start	3,914 bp
Band	n/a	End	4,951 bp
RNA expression pattern
Bgee	Human / Mouse (ortholog); Top expressed in: subcutaneous adipose tissue; caudate nucleus; putamen; lactiferous gland; right uterine tube; C1 segment; muscle layer of sigmoid colon; left uterine tube; right hemisphere of cerebellum; substantia nigra / Top expressed in: dentate gyrus of hippocampal formation granule cell; hypothalamus; striatum of neuraxis; primary visual cortex; superior frontal gyrus; cerebellar cortex; adrenal gland; hippocampus proper; neural layer of retina; esophagus; More reference expression data
BioGPS	n/a
Gene ontology
Molecular function	NADH dehydrogenase (ubiquinone) activity; oxidoreductase activity; protein kinase binding; ionotropic glutamate receptor binding
Cellular component	respirasome; membrane; postsynaptic density; integral component of membrane; mitochondrion; mitochondrial respiratory chain complex I; mitochondrial inner membrane
Biological process	mitochondrial respiratory chain complex I assembly; reactive oxygen species metabolic process; mitochondrial electron transport, NADH to ubiquinone
Sources:Amigo / QuickGO
Orthologs
Databases	NCBI: entry; OMA: entry
Species	Human	Mouse
Entrez	4536	17717
Ensembl	ENSG00000198763	ENSMUSG00000064345
UniProt	P03891	P03893
RefSeq (mRNA)	n/a	n/a
RefSeq (protein)	n/a	NP_904329
Location (UCSC)	Chr M: 0 – 0.01 Mb	Chr M: 0 – 0 Mb
PubMed search
- Wikidata
View/Edit Human	View/Edit Mouse

Location of the MT-ND2 gene in the human mitochondrial genome. MT-ND2 is one of the seven NADH dehydrogenase mitochondrial genes (yellow boxes).

MT-ND2 is a gene of the mitochondrial genome coding for the NADH dehydrogenase 2 (ND2) protein. The ND2 protein is a subunit of NADH dehydrogenase (ubiquinone), which is located in the mitochondrial inner membrane and is the largest of the five complexes of the electron transport chain. Variants of human MT-ND2 are associated with mitochondrial encephalomyopathy, lactic acidosis, and stroke-like episodes (MELAS), Leigh's syndrome (LS), Leber's hereditary optic neuropathy (LHON) and increases in adult BMI.

== Structure ==
MT-ND2 is located in mitochondrial DNA from base pair 4,470 to 5,511. The MT-ND2 gene produces a 39 kDa protein composed of 347 amino acids. MT-ND2 is one of seven mitochondrial genes encoding subunits of the enzyme NADH dehydrogenase (ubiquinone), together with MT-ND1, MT-ND3, MT-ND4, MT-ND4L, MT-ND5, and MT-ND6. Also known as Complex I, this enzyme is the largest of the respiratory complexes. The structure is L-shaped with a long, hydrophobic transmembrane domain and a hydrophilic domain for the peripheral arm that includes all the known redox centres and the NADH binding site. The MT-ND2 product and the rest of the mitochondrially encoded subunits are the most hydrophobic of the subunits of Complex I and form the core of the transmembrane region.

== Function ==
The MT-ND2 product is a subunit of the respiratory chain Complex I that is believed to belong to the minimal assembly of core proteins required to catalyze NADH dehydrogenation and electron transfer to ubiquinone (coenzyme Q10). Initially, NADH binds to Complex I and transfers two electrons to the isoalloxazine ring of the flavin mononucleotide (FMN) prosthetic arm to form FMNH_{2}. The electrons are transferred through a series of iron-sulfur (Fe-S) clusters in the prosthetic arm and finally to coenzyme Q10 (CoQ), which is reduced to ubiquinol (CoQH_{2}). The flow of electrons changes the redox state of the protein, resulting in a conformational change and pK shift of the ionizable side chain, which pumps four hydrogen ions out of the mitochondrial matrix.

== Clinical significance ==
Pathogenic variants of the mitochondrial gene MT-ND2 are known to cause mtDNA-associated Leigh syndrome, as are variants of MT-ATP6, MT-TL1, MT-TK, MT-TW, MT-TV, MT-ND1, MT-ND3, MT-ND4, MT-ND5, MT-ND6 and MT-CO3. Abnormalities in mitochondrial energy generation result in neurodegenerative disorders like Leigh syndrome, which is characterized by an onset of symptoms between 12 months and three years of age. The symptoms frequently present themselves following a viral infection and include movement disorders and peripheral neuropathy, as well as hypotonia, spasticity and cerebellar ataxia. Roughly half of affected patients die of respiratory or cardiac failure by the age of three. Leigh syndrome is a maternally inherited disorder and its diagnosis is established through genetic testing of the aforementioned mitochondrial genes, including MT-ND2. These complex I genes have been associated with a variety of neurodegenerative disorders, including Leber's hereditary optic neuropathy (LHON), mitochondrial encephalomyopathy with stroke-like episodes (MELAS) and the previously mentioned Leigh syndrome.

Mitochondrial dysfunction resulting from variants of MT-ND2, MT-ND1 and MT-ND4L have been linked to BMI in adults and implicated in metabolic disorders including obesity, diabetes and hypertension.
