= MT-ND3 =

Mitochondrial protein-coding gene whose product is involved in the respiratory chain

Identifiers
- Aliases: MT-ND3, NADH dehydrogenase, subunit 3 (complex I), NADH dehydrogenase subunit 3, ND3
- External IDs: OMIM: 516002; MGI: 102499; GeneCards: MT-ND3
Enzyme activity
EC #	BRENDA	ExPASy	KEGG	MetaCyc
7.1.1.2	↗	↗	↗	↗
Gene location (Human)
Chr.	Mitochondrial DNA (human)
Band	n/a	Start	10,059 bp
Band	n/a	End	10,404 bp
Gene location (Mouse)
Chr.	Mitochondrial DNA (mouse)
Band	n/a	Start	9,459 bp
Band	n/a	End	9,806 bp
RNA expression pattern
Bgee	Human / Mouse (ortholog); Top expressed in: right uterine tube; right auricle of heart; granulocyte; Brodmann area 9; muscle layer of sigmoid colon; lactiferous gland; subcutaneous adipose tissue; right adrenal gland; left adrenal cortex; prostate / Top expressed in: hypothalamus; hippocampus proper; olfactory bulb; lip; quadriceps femoris muscle; islet of Langerhans; superior frontal gyrus; duodenum; neural layer of retina; muscle of thigh; More reference expression data
BioGPS	n/a
Gene ontology
Molecular function	oxidoreductase activity; protein binding; NADH dehydrogenase (ubiquinone) activity
Cellular component	integral component of membrane; mitochondrial inner membrane; mitochondrial respiratory chain complex I; respirasome; membrane; mitochondrion; mitochondrial membranes; NADH dehydrogenase complex
Biological process	response to hormone; response to light intensity; cellular response to glucocorticoid stimulus; response to oxidative stress; mitochondrial respiratory chain complex I assembly; mitochondrial electron transport, NADH to ubiquinone
Sources:Amigo / QuickGO
Orthologs
Databases	NCBI: entry; OMA: entry
Species	Human	Mouse
Entrez	4537	17718
Ensembl	ENSG00000198840	ENSMUSG00000064360
UniProt	P03897	P03899
RefSeq (mRNA)	n/a	n/a
RefSeq (protein)	n/a	NP_904335
Location (UCSC)	Chr M: 0.01 – 0.01 Mb	Chr M: 0.01 – 0.01 Mb
PubMed search
- Wikidata
View/Edit Human	View/Edit Mouse

Location of the MT-ND3 gene in the human mitochondrial genome. MT-ND3 is one of the seven NADH dehydrogenase mitochondrial genes (yellow boxes).

MT-ND3 is a gene of the mitochondrial genome coding for the NADH dehydrogenase 3 (ND3) protein. The ND3 protein is a subunit of NADH dehydrogenase (ubiquinone), which is located in the mitochondrial inner membrane and is the largest of the five complexes of the electron transport chain. Variants of MT-ND3 are associated with Mitochondrial encephalomyopathy, lactic acidosis, and stroke-like episodes (MELAS), Leigh's syndrome (LS) and Leber's hereditary optic neuropathy (LHON).

== Structure ==
=== General features ===
MT-ND3 is located in human mitochondrial DNA from base pair 10,059 to 10,404. The MT-ND3 gene produces a 13 kDa protein composed of 115 amino acids. MT-ND3 is one of seven mitochondrial genes encoding subunits of the enzyme NADH dehydrogenase (ubiquinone), together with MT-ND1, MT-ND2, MT-ND4, MT-ND4L, MT-ND5, and MT-ND6. Also known as Complex I, this enzyme is the largest of the respiratory complexes. The structure is L-shaped with a long, hydrophobic transmembrane domain and a hydrophilic domain for the peripheral arm that includes all the known redox centres and the NADH binding site. The MT-ND3 product and the rest of the mitochondrially encoded subunits are the most hydrophobic of the subunits of Complex I and form the core of the transmembrane region.

=== Untranslated extra nucleotide ===
In the MT-ND3 gene from many species of birds and turtles there is an extra nucleotide that is not translated to protein. Translational frameshifting or RNA editing are alternative explanations for the maintenance of the functionality of the ND3 reading frame in birds possessing the one-nucleotide insertion. This extra nucleotide feature suggests that turtles might be related to Archosauria, as evidenced by molecular phylogeny studies. The absence of the extra nucleotide in crocodilians and some birds and turtles might also indicate that the corresponding taxa have lost this feature.

== Function ==
The MT-ND3 product is a subunit of the respiratory chain Complex I that is believed to belong to the minimal assembly of core proteins required to catalyze NADH dehydrogenation and electron transfer to ubiquinone (coenzyme Q10). Initially, NADH binds to Complex I and transfers two electrons to the isoalloxazine ring of the flavin mononucleotide (FMN) prosthetic arm to form FMNH_{2}. The electrons are transferred through a series of iron-sulfur (Fe-S) clusters in the prosthetic arm and finally to coenzyme Q10 (CoQ), which is reduced to ubiquinol (CoQH_{2}). The flow of electrons changes the redox state of the protein, resulting in a conformational change and pK shift of the ionizable side chain, which pumps four hydrogen ions out of the mitochondrial matrix.

== Clinical significance ==
Pathogenic variants of the mitochondrial gene MT-ND3 are known to cause mtDNA-associated Leigh syndrome, as are variants of MT-ATP6, MT-TL1, MT-TK, MT-TW, MT-TV, MT-ND1, MT-ND2, MT-ND4, MT-ND5, MT-ND6 and MT-CO3. Abnormalities in mitochondrial energy generation result in neurodegenerative disorders like Leigh syndrome, which is characterized by an onset of symptoms between 12 months and three years of age. The symptoms frequently present themselves following a viral infection and include movement disorders and peripheral neuropathy, as well as hypotonia, spasticity and cerebellar ataxia. Roughly half of affected patients die of respiratory or cardiac failure by the age of three. Leigh syndrome is a maternally inherited disorder and its diagnosis is established through genetic testing of the aforementioned mitochondrial genes, including MT-ND3. These complex I genes have been associated with a variety of neurodegenerative disorders, including Leber's hereditary optic neuropathy (LHON), mitochondrial encephalomyopathy with stroke-like episodes (MELAS) and the previously mentioned Leigh syndrome.

== Interactions ==
MT-ND3 has been shown to have 5 binary protein-protein interactions including 2 co-complex interactions. MT-ND3 appears to interact with APP and NDUFA9.
