= NDUFS7 =

Protein-coding gene in the species Homo sapiens

Identifiers
- Aliases: NDUFS7, CI-20, CI-20KD, MY017, PSST, NADH:ubiquinone oxidoreductase core subunit S7, MC1DN3
- External IDs: OMIM: 601825; MGI: 1922656; GeneCards: NDUFS7
Enzyme activity
EC #	BRENDA	ExPASy	KEGG	MetaCyc
7.1.1.2	↗	↗	↗	↗

Gene location (Human)
Chr.	Chromosome 19 (human)
Band	19p13.3	Start	1,383,527 bp
Band	19p13.3	End	1,395,589 bp

Gene location (Mouse)
Chr.	Chromosome 10 (mouse)
Band	10 C1|10 39.72 cM	Start	80,084,955 bp
Band	10 C1|10 39.72 cM	End	80,092,628 bp
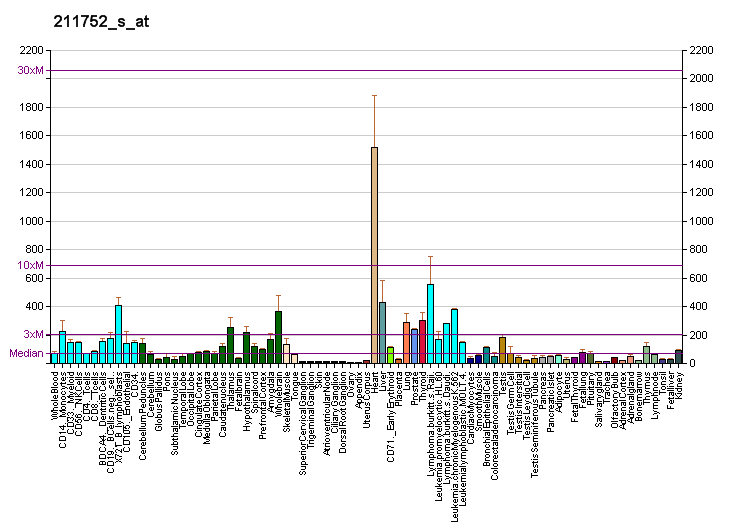
RNA expression pattern
Bgee	Human / Mouse (ortholog); Top expressed in: muscle of thigh; apex of heart; gastrocnemius muscle; mucosa of transverse colon; right auricle of heart; C1 segment; left ventricle; right hemisphere of cerebellum; left testis; right testis / Top expressed in: interventricular septum; facial motor nucleus; myocardium of ventricle; digastric muscle; extraocular muscle; soleus muscle; thoracic diaphragm; cardiac muscles; right ventricle; masseter muscle; More reference expression data
BioGPS	More reference expression data
Gene ontology
Molecular function	4 iron, 4 sulfur cluster binding; quinone binding; iron-sulfur cluster binding; metal ion binding; oxidoreductase activity, acting on NAD(P)H, quinone or similar compound as acceptor; protein binding; oxidoreductase activity; NADH dehydrogenase activity; NADH dehydrogenase (ubiquinone) activity; protease binding
Cellular component	synaptic membrane; soma; mitochondrial matrix; mitochondrion; neuron projection; respirasome; mitochondrial respiratory chain complex I
Biological process	mitochondrial respiratory chain complex I assembly; mitochondrial electron transport, NADH to ubiquinone; aerobic dissimilation; electron transport coupled proton transport
Sources:Amigo / QuickGO
Orthologs
Databases	NCBI: entry; OMA: entry
Species	Human	Mouse
Entrez	374291	75406
Ensembl	ENSG00000115286	ENSMUSG00000020153
UniProt	O75251	Q9DC70
RefSeq (mRNA)	NM_024407; NM_001363602	NM_029272; NM_001364694
RefSeq (protein)	NP_077718; NP_001350531	NP_083548; NP_001351623
Location (UCSC)	Chr 19: 1.38 – 1.4 Mb	Chr 10: 80.08 – 80.09 Mb
PubMed search
- Wikidata
View/Edit Human	View/Edit Mouse

NADH dehydrogenase [ubiquinone] iron-sulfur protein 7, mitochondrial, also knowns as NADH-ubiquinone oxidoreductase 20 kDa subunit, Complex I-20kD (CI-20kD), or PSST subunit is an enzyme that in humans is encoded by the NDUFS7 gene. The NDUFS7 protein is a subunit of NADH dehydrogenase (ubiquinone) also known as Complex I, which is located in the mitochondrial inner membrane and is the largest of the five complexes of the electron transport chain.

== Structure ==
The NDUFS7 gene is located on the p arm of chromosome 19 in position 13.3. The NDUFS7 gene produces a 25 kDa protein composed of 238 amino acids. The PSST subunit is highly conserved across evolutionary distances. Crystal structures and mutational studies indicate that it is one of the ubiquinone binding sites of Complex I, together with the TYKY (NDUFS8) subunit. It has been proposed that PSST, along with TYKY, 49 kDa, ND1 and ND5 subunits interact with iron-sulfur clusters as part of the catalytic core of NADH dehydrogenase (ubiquinone).

== Function ==
The PSST subunit encoded by the NDUSF7 gene is one of over 40 subunits involved in the transfer of electrons from NADH to ubiquinone. Specifically, it is thought that the PSST subunit directly couples electron transfer between the iron-sulfur cluster N2 and ubiquinone, along with ubiquinone-binding ND1. Functional evidence for the importance of PSST has been garnered from mutational studies in the obligate aerobic yeast, Yarrowia lipolytica, which elucidated a central role in proton translocation that was reduced in mutant forms of the subunit.

== Clinical significance ==
Mitochondrial complex I deficiency (MT-C1D) is caused by mutations affecting the NDUFS7 gene. Complex I deficiency is a disorder of the mitochondrial respiratory chain that causes a wide range of clinical manifestations, from lethal neonatal disease to adult-onset neurodegenerative disorders. Phenotypes include macrocephaly with progressive leukodystrophy, non-specific encephalopathy, cardiomyopathy, myopathy, liver disease, Leigh syndrome, Leber's hereditary optic neuropathy, and some forms of Parkinson's disease. Leigh syndrome is an early-onset progressive neurodegenerative disorder characterized by the presence of focal, bilateral lesions in one or more areas of the central nervous system including the brainstem, thalamus, basal ganglia, cerebellum and spinal cord, and is the most common mitochondrial encephalomyopathy. Clinical features depend on which areas of the central nervous system are involved and include subacute onset of psychomotor retardation, hypotonia, ataxia, weakness, vision loss, eye movement abnormalities, seizures, dysphagia, and lactic acidosis.

== Interactions ==
In addition to co-subunits for complex I, NDUFS7 has protein-protein interactions with ENO2 and ARRB2.
