= ND4 =

ND4 can mean several things:

- Neutral density filter (ND) with an attenuation factor of 4, or simply ND4
- MT-ND4, NADH dehydrogenase subunit 4, or simply ND4
