= NDUFAF2 =

Protein-coding gene in the species Homo sapiens

Identifiers
- Aliases: NDUFAF2, B17.2L, MMTN, NDUFA12L, mimitin, NADH:ubiquinone oxidoreductase complex assembly factor 2, MC1DN10
- External IDs: OMIM: 609653; MGI: 1922847; GeneCards: NDUFAF2

Gene location (Human)
| Chr. | Chromosome 5 (human) |
| Band | 5q12.1 | Start | 60,945,177 bp |
| Band | 5q12.1 | End | 61,154,531 bp |

Gene location (Mouse)
| Chr. | Chromosome 13 (mouse) |
| Band | 13|13 D2.1 | Start | 108,139,249 bp |
| Band | 13|13 D2.1 | End | 108,295,157 bp |
RNA expression pattern
| Bgee | Human / Mouse (ortholog); Top expressed in: Achilles tendon; gastrocnemius muscle; tibial arteries; islet of Langerhans; left coronary artery; left ventricle; muscle layer of sigmoid colon; right auricle of heart; nucleus accumbens; ascending aorta / Top expressed in: hand; facial motor nucleus; yolk sac; maxillary prominence; mandibular prominence; medial vestibular nucleus; deep cerebellar nuclei; zygote; seminiferous tubule; supraoptic nucleus; More reference expression data |
| BioGPS | n/a |
Gene ontology
| Molecular function | electron transfer activity; NADH dehydrogenase (ubiquinone) activity |
| Cellular component | mitochondrial inner membrane; membrane; mitochondrion |
| Biological process | cellular respiration; negative regulation of insulin secretion involved in cellular response to glucose stimulus; reactive oxygen species metabolic process; mitochondrial respiratory chain complex I assembly; respiratory electron transport chain |
Sources:Amigo / QuickGO
Orthologs
| Databases | NCBI: entry; OMA: entry |
| Species | Human | Mouse |
| Entrez | 91942 | 75597 |
| Ensembl | ENSG00000164182 | ENSMUSG00000068184 |
| UniProt | Q8N183 | Q59J78 |
| RefSeq (mRNA) | NM_174889 | NM_001127346; NM_001360140 |
| RefSeq (protein) | NP_777549 | NP_001120818; NP_001347069 |
| Location (UCSC) | Chr 5: 60.95 – 61.15 Mb | Chr 13: 108.14 – 108.3 Mb |
| PubMed search |
- Wikidata
| View/Edit Human | View/Edit Mouse |

NADH:ubiquinone oxidoreductase complex assembly factor 2 (NDUFAF2), also known as B17.2L or NDUFA12L, is a protein that in humans is encoded by the NDUFAF2, or B17.2L, gene. The NDUFAF2 protein is a chaperone involved in the assembly of NADH dehydrogenase (ubiquinone) also known as complex I, which is located in the mitochondrial inner membrane and is the largest of the five complexes of the electron transport chain. Mutations in this gene have been associated with progressive encephalopathy and Leigh disease resulting from mitochondrial complex I deficiency.

== Structure ==
NDUFAF2 is located on the q arm of chromosome 5 in position 12.1. The NDUFAF2 gene produces a 20 kDa protein composed of 169 amino acids. The protein is a chaperone of the complex I NDUFA12 subunit family.

== Function ==
NADH:ubiquinone oxidoreductase (complex I) catalyzes the transfer of electrons from NADH to ubiquinone (coenzyme Q) in the first step of the mitochondrial respiratory chain, resulting in the translocation of protons across the inner mitochondrial membrane. The NDUFAF2 gene encodes a complex I assembly factor, B17.2L, that is important for the correct function of the mitochondrial respiratory chain. Specifically, B17.2L acts as a molecular chaperone, associating with an 830 kDa subassembly in the late stages of complex I assembly.

== Clinical significance ==
Mutations in NDUFAF2 have been associated with complex I deficiency and mitochondrial diseases. These disorders are a result of the dysfunction of the mitochondrial respiratory chain and can cause a wide range of clinical manifestations from lethal neonatal disease to adult-onset neurodegenerative disorders. Phenotypes include macrocephaly with progressive leukodystrophy, non-specific encephalopathy, cardiomyopathy, myopathy, liver disease, Leigh syndrome, Leber hereditary optic neuropathy, and some forms of Parkinson disease. Clinically, NDUFAF2 mutations have been associated with progressive encephalopathy and Leigh disease.

== Interactions ==
In addition to co-complexes, NDUFAF2 has protein-protein interactions with CYB5B SEC22B, TMEM97, TMEM201, SPG21, LPAR3, STX8, OPTN.
