= Allotopic expression =

Type of gene expression

Allotopic expression (AE) refers to expression of genes in the cell nucleus that normally are expressed only from the mitochondrial genome. Biomedically engineered AE has been suggested as a possible future tool in gene therapy of certain mitochondria-related diseases, however this view is controversial. While this type of expression has been successfully carried out in yeast, the results in mammals have been conflicting.

== Evolution ==
In the cells of extant organisms, the vast majority of the proteins present in the mitochondria are coded for by nuclear DNA. Those genes are thought to have transferred to the eukaryotic nucleus during evolution, suggesting that genes transferred not only survived but are expressed in the cell nucleus.

== Use in therapy ==
In 2014, Gensight Biologics began a clinical program of allotopic expressing the MT-ND4 gene in the nucleus as therapies for Leber's hereditary optic neuropathy. In 2020, Gensight released Phase III clinical trial results, which showed a notable improvements against the normal progression of the disease but statistical insignificance in all areas. The company suspected the outcome was due to the transferral of viral vector DNA from the treated eye to the untreated eye of each patient, and thus a full control group trial in which the control group have no exposure to the drug may be needed if requested by the Food and Drug Administration.

Gensight plans to initiate pre-clinical studies of allotopic expressing the MT-ND1 gene after the GS010 phase 3 trial.

== Research ==
The SENS Research Foundation has reported success in expressing the ATP6 gene allotopically in vitro.

As of 6 September 2016 and as a result of funds raised at Lifespan.io, the SENS Research Foundation showed ATP6 and ATP8 could be successfully expressed with their published research appearing in Nucleic Acids Research providing proof of concept for the MitoSENS repair approach for repairing age related damage.
