= LRPPRC =

Protein-coding gene in the species Homo sapiens

Identifiers
- Aliases: LRPPRC, CLONE-23970, GP130, LRP130, LSFC, leucine rich pentatricopeptide repeat containing, MC4DN5
- External IDs: OMIM: 607544; MGI: 1919666; GeneCards: LRPPRC

Gene location (Human)
Chr.	Chromosome 2 (human)
Band	2p21	Start	43,886,224 bp
Band	2p21	End	43,996,226 bp

Gene location (Mouse)
Chr.	Chromosome 17 (mouse)
Band	17|17 E4	Start	85,012,675 bp
Band	17|17 E4	End	85,098,217 bp
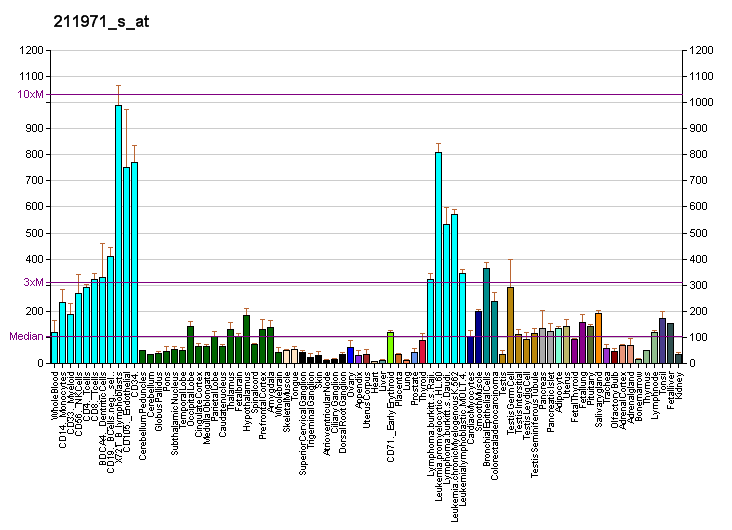

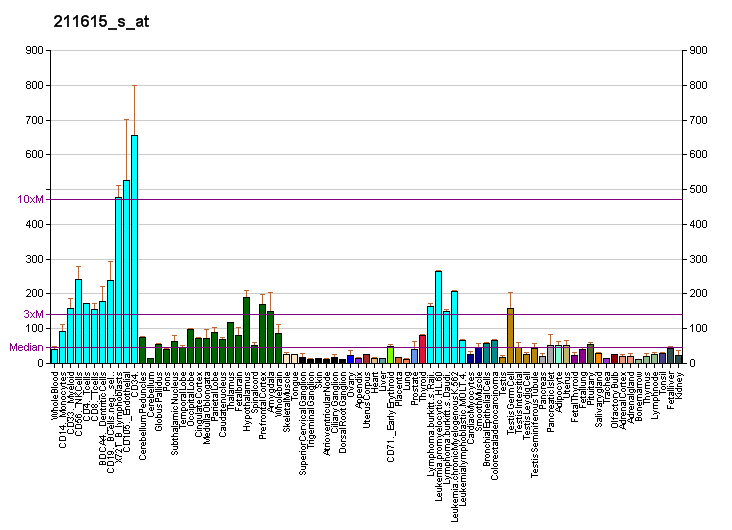
RNA expression pattern
Bgee	Human / Mouse (ortholog); Top expressed in: Skeletal muscle tissue of rectus abdominis; biceps brachii; mucosa of sigmoid colon; body of tongue; kidney tubule; Skeletal muscle tissue of biceps brachii; gonad; jejunum; mucosa of transverse colon; skin of thigh / Top expressed in: cardiac muscle tissue of left ventricle; interventricular septum; choroid plexus of fourth ventricle; plantaris muscle; extensor digitorum longus muscle; epiblast; extraocular muscle; right ventricle; soleus muscle; thoracic diaphragm; More reference expression data
BioGPS	More reference expression data
Gene ontology
Molecular function	protein binding; single-stranded DNA binding; microtubule binding; ubiquitin protein ligase binding; beta-tubulin binding; actin filament binding; DNA binding; endonuclease activity; RNA binding
Cellular component	condensed nuclear chromosome; nuclear inner membrane; mitochondrial nucleoid; perinuclear region of cytoplasm; cytoplasm; cytoskeleton; nucleoplasm; microtubule; nuclear outer membrane; membrane; mitochondrion; nucleus; ribonucleoprotein complex
Biological process	regulation of transcription, DNA-templated; mRNA transport; mitochondrion transport along microtubule; transcription, DNA-templated; negative regulation of mitochondrial RNA catabolic process; regulation of mitochondrial translation; RNA modification; nucleic acid phosphodiester bond hydrolysis; transport
Sources:Amigo / QuickGO
Orthologs
Databases	NCBI: entry; OMA: entry
Species	Human	Mouse
Entrez	10128	72416
Ensembl	ENSG00000138095	ENSMUSG00000024120
UniProt	P42704	Q6PB66
RefSeq (mRNA)	NM_133259	NM_028233
RefSeq (protein)	NP_573566	NP_082509
Location (UCSC)	Chr 2: 43.89 – 44 Mb	Chr 17: 85.01 – 85.1 Mb
PubMed search
- Wikidata
View/Edit Human	View/Edit Mouse

Leucine-rich PPR motif-containing protein, mitochondrial is a protein that in humans is encoded by the LRPPRC gene. Transcripts ranging in size from 4.8 to 7.0 kb which result from alternative polyadenylation have been reported for this gene.

== Function ==
This gene encodes a protein that is leucine-rich and is thought to play a role in regulating the interaction of the cytoskeleton with a variety of cellular processes.

== Clinical significance ==
An integrative genomics strategy led to the discovery that mutations in LRPPRC cause the French-Canadian variant of Leigh syndrome. Furthermore, mutation in the LRPPRC gene causes lowered expression of MT-CO1 (cytochrome c oxidase I) and MT-CO3.
