= NDUFAF6 =

Protein-coding gene in the species Homo sapiens

Identifiers
- Aliases: NDUFAF6, C8orf38, NADH:ubiquinone oxidoreductase complex assembly factor 6
- External IDs: OMIM: 612392; MGI: 1924197; GeneCards: NDUFAF6

Gene location (Mouse)
Chr.	Chromosome 4 (mouse)
Band	4|4 A1	Start	11,051,045 bp
Band	4|4 A1	End	11,076,205 bp
Gene ontology
Molecular function	transferase activity
Cellular component	nucleus; membrane; cytoplasm; mitochondrion; mitochondrial inner membrane
Biological process	mitochondrial respiratory chain complex I assembly; biosynthesis
Sources:Amigo / QuickGO
Orthologs
Databases	NCBI: entry; OMA: entry
Species	Human	Mouse
Entrez	137682	76947
Ensembl	ENSG00000156170	ENSMUSG00000050323
UniProt	Q330K2	A2AIL4
RefSeq (mRNA)	NM_152416; NM_001330582	NM_001085493
RefSeq (protein)	NP_001317511; NP_689629; NP_001341443; NP_001341444; NP_001341445 NP_001341446; NP_001341447; NP_001341448; NP_001341450; NP_001341451; NP_001341453; NP_001341456; NP_001341457; NP_001341458; NP_001341460; NP_001341461; NP_001341462; NP_001341463; NP_001341454; NP_001341459	NP_001078962
Location (UCSC)	n/a	Chr 4: 11.05 – 11.08 Mb
PubMed search
- Wikidata
View/Edit Human	View/Edit Mouse

NADH:ubiquinone oxidoreductase complex assembly factor 6 is a protein that in humans is encoded by the NDUFAF6 gene. The protein is involved in the assembly of complex I in the mitochondrial electron transport chain. Mutations in the NDUFAF6 gene have been shown to cause Complex I deficiency, Leigh syndrome, and Acadian variant Fanconi Syndrome.

== Structure ==
The NDUFAF6 gene is located on the q arm of chromosome 8 in position 22.1 and spans 222,728 base pairs. The gene produces a 38.2 kDa protein composed of 333 amino acids. The protein contains a predicted phytoene synthase domain.

== Function ==
The NDUFAF6 gene encodes a protein that localizes to mitochondria. The encoded protein plays an important role in the assembly of complex I (NADH-ubiquinone oxidoreductase) of the mitochondrial respiratory chain through regulation of subunit ND1 biogenesis.

== Clinical significance ==
Mutations in the NDUFAF6 gene are associated with complex I enzymatic deficiency and lead to Leigh syndrome, which is characterized by lesions in the central nervous system and rapid deterioration of cognitive and motor functions. In Acadians, a non-coding mutation in NDUFAF6 has been shown to cause Acadian variant Fanconi Syndrome, symptoms of which include pulmonary interstitial fibrosis and proximal tubular dysfunction accompanied by slowly progressive kidney disease. Inheritance of mutations in the NDUFAF6 gene is autosomal recessive.

== Interactions ==
The protein encoded by NDUFAF6 interacts with RHOXF2, OTX1, GUCD1, and GALNT6 proteins.
