= FASTK =

Protein-coding gene in the species Homo sapiens

Identifiers
- Aliases: FASTK, Fastk, 0610011K02Rik, 610011K02Rik, FAST, Fas activated serine/threonine kinase
- External IDs: OMIM: 606965; MGI: 1913837; HomoloGene: 4884; GeneCards: FASTK; OMA:FASTK - orthologs

Gene location (Human)
| Chr. | Chromosome 7 (human) |
| Band | 7q36.1 | Start | 151,076,624 bp |
| Band | 7q36.1 | End | 151,080,866 bp |

Gene location (Mouse)
| Chr. | Chromosome 5 (mouse) |
| Band | 5|5 A3 | Start | 24,643,438 bp |
| Band | 5|5 A3 | End | 24,650,285 bp |
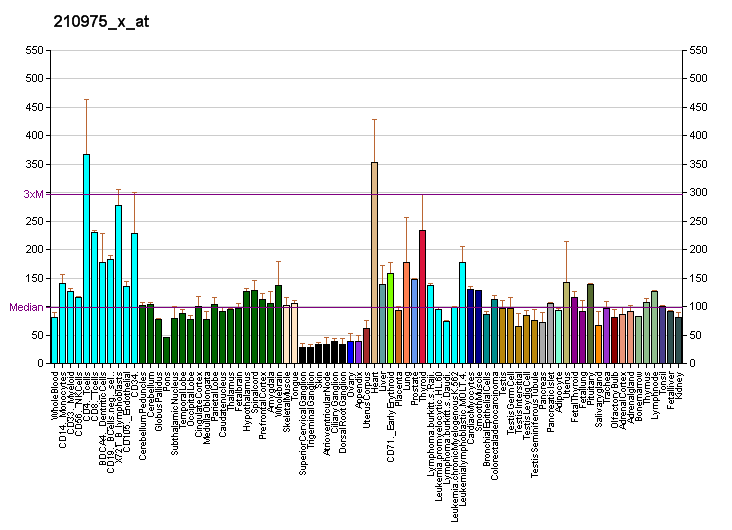

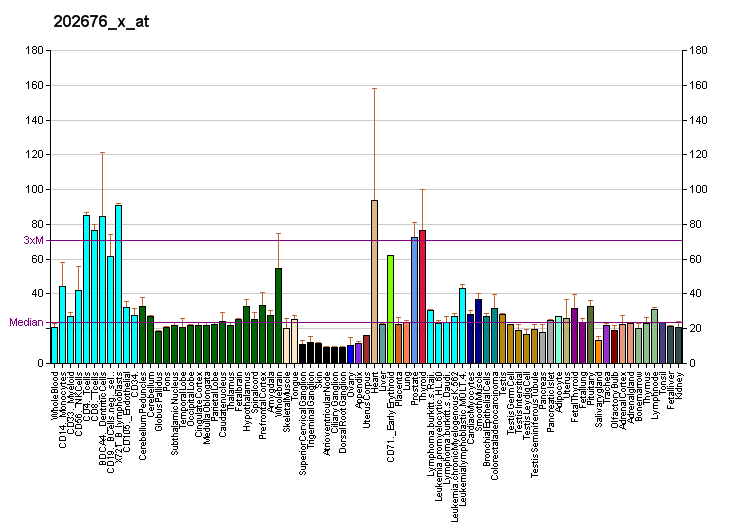

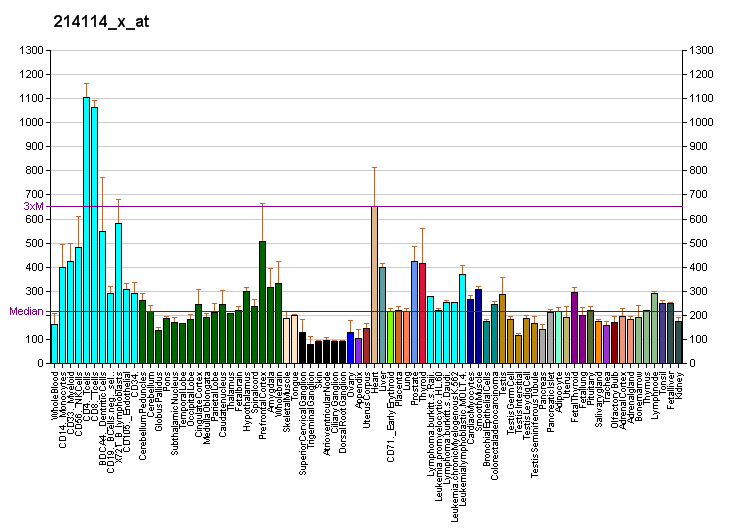
RNA expression pattern
| Bgee | Human / Mouse (ortholog); Top expressed in: apex of heart; muscle of thigh; right hemisphere of cerebellum; mucosa of transverse colon; anterior pituitary; gastrocnemius muscle; right lobe of thyroid gland; right uterine tube; right lobe of liver; left lobe of thyroid gland / Top expressed in: muscle of thigh; extensor digitorum longus muscle; superior frontal gyrus; myocardium of ventricle; cardiac muscles; interventricular septum; medial head of gastrocnemius muscle; primary visual cortex; thoracic diaphragm; lip; More reference expression data |
| BioGPS | More reference expression data |
Gene ontology
| Molecular function | kinase activity; transferase activity; nucleotide binding; protein serine/threonine kinase activity; protein kinase activity; protein binding; Fas-activated serine/threonine kinase activity; ATP binding; RNA binding |
| Cellular component | mitochondrion; mitochondrial matrix |
| Biological process | apoptotic signaling pathway; protein phosphorylation; regulation of RNA splicing; phosphorylation; apoptotic process |
Sources:Amigo / QuickGO
Orthologs
| Species | Human | Mouse |
| Entrez | 10922 | 66587 |
| Ensembl | ENSG00000164896 | ENSMUSG00000028959 |
| UniProt | Q14296 | Q9JIX9 |
| RefSeq (mRNA) | NM_001258461; NM_006712; NM_033015 | NM_023229 |
| RefSeq (protein) | NP_001245390; NP_006703; NP_148936 | n/a |
| Location (UCSC) | Chr 7: 151.08 – 151.08 Mb | Chr 5: 24.64 – 24.65 Mb |
| PubMed search |
- Wikidata
| View/Edit Human | View/Edit Mouse |

Fas-activated serine/threonine kinase is an enzyme that in humans is encoded by the FASTK gene.

The protein encoded by this gene is a member of the serine/threonine protein kinase family. This kinase was shown to be activated rapidly during Fas-mediated apoptosis in Jurkat cells. In response to Fas receptor ligation, it phosphorylates the apoptosis-promoting nuclear RNA-binding protein TIA1. The encoded protein is a strong inducer of lymphocyte apoptosis.

Two transcript variants encoding different isoforms have been found for this gene. The longer one is located in the cell nucleus and cytoplasm, and the shorter one is 34 amino acids at the N-terminus, which is transported to the mitochondrion.

The mitochondrial FASTK isoform localizes in the mitochondrial granules, where it interacts with the GRSF1 protein and binds to mt-mRNA ND6, the template of the only protein encoded on the light strand of the mitochondrial genome. In the case of FASTK deletion, it was observed loss of ND6 mt-mRNA and a 50-60% decrease in the activity of complex I of the respiratory chain. However, overexpression of this protein resulted in the stabilization of ND6 mt-mRNA

Other variants exist, but their full-length natures have not yet been determined.
