= MT-ND1 =

Mitochondrial gene coding for a protein involved in the respiratory chain

Identifiers
- Aliases: MT-ND1, NADH dehydrogenase, subunit 1 (complex I), NADH dehydrogenase subunit 1, ND1
- External IDs: OMIM: 516000; MGI: 101787; GeneCards: MT-ND1
Enzyme activity
EC #	BRENDA	ExPASy	KEGG	MetaCyc
7.1.1.2	↗	↗	↗	↗
Gene location (Human)
Chr.	Mitochondrial DNA (human)
Band	n/a	Start	3,307 bp
Band	n/a	End	4,262 bp
Gene location (Mouse)
Chr.	Mitochondrial DNA (mouse)
Band	n/a	Start	2,751 bp
Band	n/a	End	3,707 bp
RNA expression pattern
Bgee	Human / Mouse (ortholog); Top expressed in: subcutaneous adipose tissue; right hemisphere of cerebellum; right testis; right frontal lobe; left testis; gastrocnemius muscle; superior frontal gyrus; primary visual cortex; olfactory zone of nasal mucosa; prefrontal cortex / Top expressed in: tail of embryo; striatum of neuraxis; olfactory bulb; yolk sac; cerebellum; primary visual cortex; hypothalamus; genital tubercle; superior frontal gyrus; right kidney; More reference expression data
BioGPS	n/a
Gene ontology
Molecular function	NADH dehydrogenase (ubiquinone) activity; oxidoreductase activity; protein binding; NADH dehydrogenase activity
Cellular component	integral component of membrane; mitochondrial inner membrane; mitochondrial respiratory chain complex I; soma; dendrite; respirasome; mitochondrial membranes; mitochondrion; membrane
Biological process	response to hydroperoxide; response to organic cyclic compound; mitochondrial respiratory chain complex I assembly; mitochondrial electron transport, NADH to ubiquinone; cellular respiration; aerobic dissimilation
Sources:Amigo / QuickGO
Orthologs
Databases	NCBI: entry; OMA: entry
Species	Human	Mouse
Entrez	4535	17716
Ensembl	ENSG00000198888	ENSMUSG00000064341
UniProt	P03886	P03888
RefSeq (mRNA)	n/a	n/a
RefSeq (protein)	n/a	NP_904328
Location (UCSC)	Chr M: 0 – 0 Mb	Chr M: 0 – 0 Mb
PubMed search
- Wikidata
View/Edit Human	View/Edit Mouse

Location of the MT-ND1 gene in the human mitochondrial genome. MT-ND1 is one of the seven NADH dehydrogenase mitochondrial genes (yellow boxes).

MT-ND1 is a gene of the mitochondrial genome coding for the NADH-ubiquinone oxidoreductase chain 1 (ND1) protein. The ND1 protein is a subunit of NADH dehydrogenase, which is located in the mitochondrial inner membrane and is the largest of the five complexes of the electron transport chain. Variants of the human MT-ND1 gene are associated with mitochondrial encephalomyopathy, lactic acidosis, and stroke-like episodes (MELAS), Leigh's syndrome (LS), Leber's hereditary optic neuropathy (LHON) and increases in adult BMI.

== Structure ==
MT-ND1 is located in mitochondrial DNA from base pair 3,307 to 4,262. The MT-ND1 gene produces a 36 kDa protein composed of 318 amino acids. MT-ND1 is one of seven mitochondrial genes encoding subunits of the enzyme NADH dehydrogenase (ubiquinone), together with MT-ND2, MT-ND3, MT-ND4, MT-ND4L, MT-ND5, and MT-ND6. Also known as Complex I, this enzyme is the largest of the respiratory complexes. The structure is L-shaped with a long, hydrophobic transmembrane domain and a hydrophilic domain for the peripheral arm that includes all the known redox centres and the NADH binding site. The MT-ND1 product and the rest of the mitochondrially encoded subunits are the most hydrophobic of the subunits of Complex I and form the core of the transmembrane region.

== Function ==
MT-ND1-encoded NADH-ubiquinone oxidoreductase chain 1 is a subunit of the respiratory chain Complex I that is supposed to belong to the minimal assembly of core proteins required to catalyze NADH dehydrogenation and electron transfer to ubiquinone (coenzyme Q10). Initially, NADH binds to Complex I and transfers two electrons to the isoalloxazine ring of the flavin mononucleotide (FMN) prosthetic arm to form FMNH_{2}. The electrons are transferred through a series of iron-sulfur (Fe-S) clusters in the prosthetic arm and finally to coenzyme Q10 (CoQ), which is reduced to ubiquinol (CoQH_{2}). The flow of electrons changes the redox state of the protein, resulting in a conformational change and pK shift of the ionizable side chain, which pumps four hydrogen ions out of the mitochondrial matrix.

== Clinical significance ==
Pathogenic variants of the mitochondrial gene MT-ND1 are known to cause mtDNA-associated Leigh syndrome, as are variants of MT-ATP6, MT-TL1, MT-TK, MT-TW, MT-TV, MT-ND2, MT-ND3, MT-ND4, MT-ND5, MT-ND6 and MT-CO3. Abnormalities in mitochondrial energy generation result in neurodegenerative disorders like Leigh syndrome, which is characterized by an onset of symptoms between 12 months and three years of age. The symptoms frequently present themselves following a viral infection and include movement disorders and peripheral neuropathy, as well as hypotonia, spasticity and cerebellar ataxia. Roughly half of affected individuals die of respiratory or cardiac failure by the age of three. Leigh syndrome is a maternally inherited disorder and its diagnosis is established through genetic testing of the aforementioned mitochondrial genes, including MT-ND1. The m.4171C>A/MT-ND1 mutation also leads to a Leigh-like phenotype as well as bilateral brainstem lesions affecting the vestibular nuclei, resulting in vision loss, vomiting and vertigo. These complex I genes have been associated with a variety of neurodegenerative disorders, including Leber's hereditary optic neuropathy (LHON), mitochondrial encephalomyopathy with stroke-like episodes (MELAS), overlap between LHON and MELAS, and the previously mentioned Leigh syndrome.

Mitochondrial dysfunction resulting from variants of MT-ND1, MT-ND2 and MT-ND4L have been linked to BMI in adults and implicated in metabolic disorders including obesity, diabetes and hypertension.
