= MT-ND5 =

Mitochondrial gene coding for a protein involved in the respiratory chain

Identifiers
- Aliases: MT-ND5, mitochondrially encoded NADH dehydrogenase 5, NADH dehydrogenase, subunit 5 (complex I), NADH dehydrogenase subunit 5, ND5
- External IDs: OMIM: 516005; MGI: 102496; GeneCards: MT-ND5
Enzyme activity
EC #	BRENDA	ExPASy	KEGG	MetaCyc
7.1.1.2	↗	↗	↗	↗
Gene location (Human)
Chr.	Mitochondrial DNA (human)
Band	n/a	Start	12,337 bp
Band	n/a	End	14,148 bp
Gene location (Mouse)
Chr.	Mitochondrial DNA (mouse)
Band	n/a	Start	11,742 bp
Band	n/a	End	13,565 bp
RNA expression pattern
Bgee	Human / Mouse (ortholog); Top expressed in: nasal epithelium; postcentral gyrus; right ventricle; lateral nuclear group of thalamus; external globus pallidus; ventral tegmental area; renal medulla; pons; cardia; pars compacta / Top expressed in: central gray substance of midbrain; globus pallidus; olfactory tubercle; temporal lobe; paraventricular nucleus of hypothalamus; amygdala; body of femur; nucleus accumbens; right ventricle; subiculum; More reference expression data
BioGPS	n/a
Gene ontology
Molecular function	NADH dehydrogenase (ubiquinone) activity; oxidoreductase activity; NADH dehydrogenase activity
Cellular component	integral component of membrane; mitochondrial inner membrane; neuron projection; mitochondrial respiratory chain complex I; respirasome; membrane; mitochondrion
Biological process	ATP synthesis coupled electron transport; response to hypoxia; response to hydrogen peroxide; response to organonitrogen compound; mitochondrial respiratory chain complex I assembly; mitochondrial electron transport, NADH to ubiquinone
Sources:Amigo / QuickGO
Orthologs
Databases	NCBI: entry; OMA: entry
Species	Human	Mouse
Entrez	4540	17721
Ensembl	ENSG00000198786	ENSMUSG00000064367
UniProt	P03915	P03921
RefSeq (mRNA)	n/a	n/a
RefSeq (protein)	n/a	NP_904338
Location (UCSC)	Chr M: 0.01 – 0.01 Mb	Chr M: 0.01 – 0.01 Mb
PubMed search
- Wikidata
View/Edit Human	View/Edit Mouse

Location of the MT-ND5 gene in the human mitochondrial genome. MT-ND5 is one of the seven NADH dehydrogenase mitochondrial genes (yellow boxes).

MT-ND5 is a gene of the mitochondrial genome coding for the NADH-ubiquinone oxidoreductase chain 5 protein (ND5). The ND5 protein is a subunit of NADH dehydrogenase (ubiquinone), which is located in the mitochondrial inner membrane and is the largest of the five complexes of the electron transport chain. Variations in human MT-ND5 are associated with mitochondrial encephalomyopathy, lactic acidosis, and stroke-like episodes (MELAS) as well as some symptoms of Leigh's syndrome and Leber's hereditary optic neuropathy (LHON).

== Structure ==
MT-ND5 is located in mitochondrial DNA from base pair 12,337 to 14,148. The MT-ND5 gene produces a 67 kDa protein composed of 603 amino acids. MT-ND5 is one of seven mitochondrial genes encoding subunits of the enzyme NADH dehydrogenase (ubiquinone), together with MT-ND1, MT-ND2, MT-ND3, MT-ND4, MT-ND4L, and MT-ND6. Also known as Complex I, this enzyme is the largest of the respiratory complexes. The structure is L-shaped with a long, hydrophobic transmembrane domain and a hydrophilic domain for the peripheral arm that includes all the known redox centres and the NADH binding site. MT-ND5 and the rest of the mitochondrially encoded subunits are the most hydrophobic of the subunits of Complex I and form the core of the transmembrane region.

== Function ==
The MT-ND5 product is a subunit of the respiratory chain Complex I that is supposed to belong to the minimal assembly of core proteins required to catalyze NADH dehydrogenation and electron transfer to ubiquinone (coenzyme Q10). Initially, NADH binds to Complex I and transfers two electrons to the isoalloxazine ring of the flavin mononucleotide (FMN) prosthetic arm to form FMNH_{2}. The electrons are transferred through a series of iron-sulfur (Fe-S) clusters in the prosthetic arm and finally to coenzyme Q10 (CoQ), which is reduced to ubiquinol (CoQH_{2}). The flow of electrons changes the redox state of the protein, resulting in a conformational change and pK shift of the ionizable side chain, which pumps four hydrogen ions out of the mitochondrial matrix.

== Clinical Significance ==
A small percentage of mitochondrial encephalomyopathy, lactic acidosis, and stroke-like episodes (MELAS) are caused by a G>A mutation at base pair 13513 in the MT-ND5 gene. Mutations in the MT-ND5 gene cause impaired Complex I function of the mitochondrial electron transport system, impairing those tissues that require significant energy input, such as the brain and muscles. Cardiac and renal involvement as well as symptoms such as myopathy and lactic acidosis can also be observed. Those with MT-ND5 mutations can display the major features of MELAS and MERRF in some patients, as well as symptoms of Leigh's syndrome and/or Leber's hereditary optic neuropathy (LHON) in others.

== Interactions ==
MT-ND5 interacts with Glutamine synthetase (GLUL), LIG4 and YME1L1.
