= MT-ND4L =

Mitochondrial gene coding for a protein involved in the respiratory chain

Identifiers
- Aliases: MT-ND4L, NADH dehydrogenase, subunit 4L (complex I), NADH dehydrogenase subunit 4L, ND4L
- External IDs: OMIM: 516004; MGI: 102497; GeneCards: MT-ND4L
Enzyme activity
EC #	BRENDA	ExPASy	KEGG	MetaCyc
7.1.1.2	↗	↗	↗	↗
Gene location (Human)
Chr.	Mitochondrial DNA (human)
Band	n/a	Start	10,470 bp
Band	n/a	End	10,766 bp
Gene location (Mouse)
Chr.	Mitochondrial DNA (mouse)
Band	n/a	Start	9,877 bp
Band	n/a	End	10,173 bp
RNA expression pattern
Bgee	Human / Mouse (ortholog); Top expressed in: primary visual cortex; superior frontal gyrus; rectum; apex of heart; renal cortex; muscle of thigh; right uterine tube; right lobe of thyroid gland; left adrenal cortex; olfactory zone of nasal mucosa / Top expressed in: cerebellar cortex; superior frontal gyrus; neural layer of retina; adrenal gland; primary visual cortex; hypothalamus; muscle of thigh; striatum of neuraxis; hippocampus proper; zone of skin; More reference expression data
BioGPS	n/a
Gene ontology
Molecular function	oxidoreductase activity, acting on NAD(P)H; oxidoreductase activity; NADH dehydrogenase (ubiquinone) activity
Cellular component	integral component of membrane; respirasome; membrane; mitochondrion; mitochondrial membranes; mitochondrial respiratory chain complex I; NADH dehydrogenase complex
Biological process	ATP synthesis coupled electron transport; mitochondrial electron transport, NADH to ubiquinone
Sources:Amigo / QuickGO
Orthologs
Databases	NCBI: entry; OMA: entry
Species	Human	Mouse
Entrez	4539	17720
Ensembl	ENSG00000212907	ENSMUSG00000065947
UniProt	P03901	P03903
RefSeq (mRNA)	n/a	n/a
RefSeq (protein)	n/a	NP_904336
Location (UCSC)	Chr M: 0.01 – 0.01 Mb	Chr M: 0.01 – 0.01 Mb
PubMed search
- Wikidata
View/Edit Human	View/Edit Mouse

Location of the MT-ND4L gene in the human mitochondrial genome. MT-ND4L is one of the seven NADH dehydrogenase mitochondrial genes (yellow boxes).

MT-ND4L is a gene of the mitochondrial genome coding for the NADH-ubiquinone oxidoreductase chain 4L (ND4L) protein. The ND4L protein is a subunit of NADH dehydrogenase (ubiquinone), which is located in the mitochondrial inner membrane and is the largest of the five complexes of the electron transport chain. Variants of human MT-ND4L are associated with increased BMI in adults and Leber's Hereditary Optic Neuropathy (LHON).

== Structure ==
The MT-ND4L gene is located in human mitochondrial DNA from base pair 10,469 to 10,765. The MT-ND4L gene produces an 11 kDa protein composed of 98 amino acids. MT-ND4L is one of seven mitochondrial genes encoding subunits of the enzyme NADH dehydrogenase (ubiquinone), together with MT-ND1, MT-ND2, MT-ND3, MT-ND4, MT-ND5, and MT-ND6. Also known as Complex I, this enzyme is the largest of the respiratory complexes. The structure is L-shaped with a long, hydrophobic transmembrane domain and a hydrophilic domain for the peripheral arm that includes all the known redox centres and the NADH binding site. MT-ND4L and the rest of the mitochondrially encoded subunits are the most hydrophobic of the subunits of Complex I and form the core of the transmembrane region.

An unusual feature of the human MT-ND4L gene is the 7-nucleotide gene overlap of its last three codons (5'-CAA TGC TAA-3' coding for Gln, Cys and Stop) with the first three codons of the MT-ND4 gene (5'-ATG CTA AAA-3' coding for amino acids Met-Leu-Lys). With respect to the MT-ND4L reading frame (+1), the MT-ND4 gene starts in the +3 reading frame: [CAA][TGC][TAA]AA versus CA[ATG][CTA][AAA].

== Function ==
The MT-ND4L product is a subunit of the respiratory chain Complex I that is believed to belong to the minimal assembly of core proteins required to catalyze NADH dehydrogenation and electron transfer to ubiquinone (coenzyme Q10). Initially, NADH binds to Complex I and transfers two electrons to the isoalloxazine ring of the flavin mononucleotide (FMN) prosthetic arm to form FMNH_{2}. The electrons are transferred through a series of iron-sulfur (Fe-S) clusters in the prosthetic arm and finally to coenzyme Q10 (CoQ), which is reduced to ubiquinol (CoQH_{2}). The flow of electrons changes the redox state of the protein, resulting in a conformational change and pK shift of the ionizable side chain, which pumps four hydrogen ions out of the mitochondrial matrix.

== Clinical significance ==
Mitochondrial dysfunction resulting from variants of MT-ND4L, MT-ND1 and MT-ND2 have been linked to BMI in adults and implicated in metabolic disorders including obesity, diabetes and hypertension.

A T>C mutation at position 10,663 in the mitochondrial gene MT-ND4L is known to cause Leber's Hereditary Optic Neuropathy (LHON). This mutation results in the replacement of the amino acid valine with alanine at position 65 of the protein ND4L, disrupting function of Complex I in the electron transport chain. It is unknown how this mutation leads to the loss of vision in LHON patients, but it may interrupt ATP production due to the impaired activity of Complex I. Mutations in other genes encoding subunits of Complex I, including MT-ND1, MT-ND2, MT-ND4, MT-ND5, and MT-ND6 are also known to cause LHON.
