= Neuropathy, ataxia, and retinitis pigmentosa =

- Other names: Neurogenic muscle weakness-ataxia-retinitis pigmentosa syndrome
- This condition is inherited via a mitochondrial inheritance manner
- Specialty: Neurology

Neuropathy, ataxia, and retinitis pigmentosa, also known as NARP syndrome, is a rare disease with mitochondrial inheritance that causes a variety of signs and symptoms chiefly affecting the nervous system Beginning in childhood or early adulthood, most people with NARP experience numbness, tingling, or pain in the arms and legs (sensory neuropathy); muscle weakness; and problems with balance and coordination (ataxia). Many affected individuals also have vision loss caused by changes in the light-sensitive tissue that lines the back of the eye (the retina). In some cases, the vision loss results from a condition called retinitis pigmentosa. This eye disease causes the light-sensing cells of the retina gradually to deteriorate.

== Presentation ==
Learning disabilities and developmental delays are often seen in children with NARP, and older individuals with this condition may experience a loss of intellectual function (dementia). Other features of NARP include seizures, hearing loss, and abnormalities of the electrical signals that control the heartbeat (cardiac conduction defects). These signs and symptoms vary among affected individuals.

== Genetics ==
Neuropathy, ataxia, and retinitis pigmentosa is a condition related to changes in mitochondrial DNA. Mutations in the MT-ATP6 gene cause neuropathy, ataxia, and retinitis pigmentosa. The MT-ATP6 gene provides instructions for making a protein that is essential for normal mitochondrial function. Through a series of chemical reactions, mitochondria use oxygen and simple sugars to create adenosine triphosphate (ATP), the cell's main energy source. The MT-ATP6 protein forms one part (subunit) of an enzyme called ATP synthase, which is responsible for the last step in ATP production. Mutations in the MT-ATP6 gene alter the structure or function of ATP synthase, reducing the ability of mitochondria to make ATP. It remains unclear how this disruption in mitochondrial energy production leads to muscle weakness, vision loss, and the other specific features of NARP.

This condition is inherited in a pattern reflecting its location in mitochondrial DNA, which is also known as maternal inheritance. This pattern of inheritance applies to genes contained in mitochondrial DNA. Because egg cells, but not sperm cells, contribute mitochondria to the developing embryo, only females pass mitochondrial conditions to their children. Mitochondrial disorders can appear in every generation of a family and can affect both males and females, but fathers do not pass mitochondrial traits to their children. Most of the body's cells contain thousands of mitochondria, each with one or more copies of mitochondrial DNA. The severity of some mitochondrial disorders is associated with the percentage of mitochondria in each cell that has a particular genetic change. Most individuals with NARP have a specific MT-ATP6 mutation in 70 percent to 90 percent of their mitochondria. When this mutation is present in a higher percentage of a person's mitochondria—greater than 90 percent to 95 percent—it causes a more severe condition known as maternally inherited Leigh syndrome. Because these two conditions result from the same genetic changes and can occur in different members of a single family, researchers believe that they may represent a spectrum of overlapping features instead of two distinct syndromes.

== Diagnosis ==
The clinical diagnosis is backed up by investigative findings. Citrulline level in blood is decreased. Mitochondrial studies or NARP mtDNA evaluation plays a role in genetic diagnosis which can also be done prenatally.

== Treatment ==
There is currently no known cure for NARP syndrome. Symptomatic relief is targeted. Antioxidants play a role in improving the oxidative phosphorylation that is otherwise impaired.

== Prognosis ==
The severity and prognosis vary with the type of mutation involved.

== See also ==
- Leigh's disease
