= MT-TW =

Transfer RNA

mitochondrially encoded tRNA tryptophan

Identifiers
- Symbol: MT-TW
- Alt. symbols: MTTW
- NCBI gene: 4578
- HGNC: 7501
- RefSeq: NC_001807

Other data
- Locus: Chr. MT

Mitochondrially encoded tRNA tryptophan also known as MT-TW is a transfer RNA which in humans is encoded by the mitochondrial MT-TW gene.

== Structure ==
The MT-TW gene is located on the p arm of the non-nuclear mitochondrial DNA at position 12 and it spans 68 base pairs. The structure of a tRNA molecule is a distinctive folded structure which contains three hairpin loops and resembles a three-leafed clover.

== Function ==
MT-TW is a small 68 nucleotide RNA (human mitochondrial map position 5512-5579) that transfers the amino acid tryptophan to a growing polypeptide chain at the ribosome site of protein synthesis during translation.

== Clinical significance ==
Mutations in MT-TW have been associated with Leigh's syndrome. Leigh's syndrome is a severe neurological disorder that usually becomes apparent in the first year of life. This condition is characterized by progressive loss of mental and movement abilities (psychomotor regression) and typically results in death within two to three years, usually due to respiratory failure. A small number of individuals do not develop symptoms until adulthood or have symptoms that worsen more slowly. A patient with the syndrome associated with a mutation of 5537insT in the MT-TW gene exhibited symptoms of hypotonia, nystagmus, optic atrophy and seizures.

Changes in MT-TW which impair oxidate phosphorylation also cause mitochondrial encephalomyopathy, lactic acidosis, and stroke-like episodes (MELAS). MELAS is a rare mitochondrial disorder known to affect many parts of the body, especially the nervous system and the brain. Symptoms of MELAS include recurrent severe headaches, muscle weakness (myopathy), hearing loss, stroke-like episodes with a loss of consciousness, seizures, and other problems affecting the nervous system. Variants of the gene which cause the disease have included 5556G-A, 5545C-T, and 5521G-A.
