= MT-ND6 =

Mitochondrial gene coding for a protein involved in the respiratory chain

Identifiers
- Aliases: MT-ND6, NADH dehydrogenase, subunit 6 (complex I), NADH dehydrogenase subunit 6, ND6
- External IDs: OMIM: 516006; MGI: 102495; GeneCards: MT-ND6
Enzyme activity
EC #	BRENDA	ExPASy	KEGG	MetaCyc
7.1.1.2	↗	↗	↗	↗
Gene location (Human)
Chr.	Mitochondrial DNA (human)
Band	n/a	Start	14,149 bp
Band	n/a	End	14,673 bp
Gene location (Mouse)
Chr.	Mitochondrial DNA (mouse)
Band	n/a	Start	13,552 bp
Band	n/a	End	14,070 bp
RNA expression pattern
Bgee	Human / Mouse (ortholog); Top expressed in: gastric mucosa; left uterine tube; right uterine tube; right auricle of heart; granulocyte; nucleus accumbens; putamen; caudate nucleus; amygdala; fundus / Top expressed in: neural layer of retina; adrenal gland; hypothalamus; striatum of neuraxis; bone marrow; hippocampus proper; superior frontal gyrus; human kidney; cerebellar cortex; primary visual cortex; More reference expression data
BioGPS	n/a
Gene ontology
Molecular function	NADH dehydrogenase (ubiquinone) activity; oxidoreductase activity
Cellular component	integral component of membrane; mitochondrial inner membrane; respirasome; membrane; mitochondrial membranes; mitochondrion
Biological process	response to cocaine; response to nicotine; response to hydrogen peroxide; mitochondrial respiratory chain complex I assembly; mitochondrial electron transport, NADH to ubiquinone
Sources:Amigo / QuickGO
Orthologs
Databases	NCBI: entry; OMA: entry
Species	Human	Mouse
Entrez	4541	17722
Ensembl	ENSG00000198695	ENSMUSG00000064368
UniProt	P03923	P03925
RefSeq (mRNA)	n/a	n/a
RefSeq (protein)	n/a	NP_904339
Location (UCSC)	Chr M: 0.01 – 0.01 Mb	Chr M: 0.01 – 0.01 Mb
PubMed search
- Wikidata
View/Edit Human	View/Edit Mouse

Location of the MT-ND6 gene on the L strand of the human mitochondrial genome. MT-ND6 is one of the seven NADH dehydrogenase mitochondrial genes (yellow boxes).

MT-ND6 is a gene of the mitochondrial genome coding for the NADH-ubiquinone oxidoreductase chain 6 protein (ND6). The ND6 protein is a subunit of NADH dehydrogenase (ubiquinone), which is located in the mitochondrial inner membrane and is the largest of the five complexes of the electron transport chain. Variations in the human MT-ND6 gene are associated with Leigh's syndrome, Leber's hereditary optic neuropathy (LHON) and dystonia.

== Structure ==
The MT-ND6 gene is located in human mitochondrial DNA from base pair 14,149 to 14,673. MT-ND6 is the only protein-coding gene located on the L-strand of the human mitogenome.

The encoded protein is 18 kDa and composed of 172 amino acids. MT-ND6 is one of seven mitochondrial genes encoding subunits of the enzyme NADH dehydrogenase (ubiquinone), together with MT-ND1, MT-ND2, MT-ND3, MT-ND4, MT-ND4L, and MT-ND5. Also known as Complex I, this enzyme is the largest of the respiratory complexes. The structure is L-shaped with a long, hydrophobic transmembrane domain and a hydrophilic domain for the peripheral arm that includes all the known redox centres and the NADH binding site. MT-ND6 and the rest of the mitochondrially encoded subunits are the most hydrophobic of the subunits of Complex I and form the core of the transmembrane region.

== Function ==
The MT-ND6 product is a subunit of the respiratory chain Complex I that is believed to belong to the minimal assembly of core proteins required to catalyze NADH dehydrogenation and electron transfer to ubiquinone (coenzyme Q10). Initially, NADH binds to Complex I and transfers two electrons to the isoalloxazine ring of the flavin mononucleotide (FMN) prosthetic arm to form FMNH_{2}. The electrons are transferred through a series of iron-sulfur (Fe-S) clusters in the prosthetic arm and finally to coenzyme Q10 (CoQ), which is reduced to ubiquinol (CoQH_{2}). The flow of electrons changes the redox state of the protein, resulting in a conformational change and pK shift of the ionizable side chain, which pumps four hydrogen ions out of the mitochondrial matrix.

== Clinical significance ==
A T → C mutation at the 14484 base pair in the MT-ND6 gene has been identified in people with Leber's hereditary optic neuropathy (LHON). This common MT-ND6 mutation is responsible for about 14 percent of all cases of LHON, and it is the most common cause of this disorder among people of French Canadian descent. This mutation changes a single amino acid in the NADH dehydrogenase 6 protein at position 64, from methionine to valine. The T14484C mutation is associated with a good long-term prognosis; affected people with this genetic change have a 37 percent to 65 percent chance of some visual recovery. Researchers are investigating how mutations in the MT-ND6 gene lead to Leber's hereditary optic neuropathy. These genetic changes appear to prevent Complex I from interacting normally with ubiquinone, which may affect the generation of ATP and may also increase the production within mitochondria of potentially harmful molecules called reactive oxygen species (ROS). It remains unclear, however, why the effects of these mutations are often limited to the nerve that relays visual information from the eye to the brain (the optic nerve). Additional genetic and environmental factors probably contribute to the vision loss and other medical problems associated with Leber hereditary optic neuropathy.

A G → A mutation at the 14459 base pair in the MT-ND6 gene also has been identified in a small number of people with Leigh's syndrome, a progressive brain disorder that typically appears in infancy or early childhood. Affected children may experience vomiting, seizures, delayed development, muscle weakness, and problems with movement. Heart disease, kidney problems, and difficulty breathing can also occur in people with this disorder. This MT-ND6 G14459A mutation replaces the amino acid alanine with the amino acid valine at protein position 72 in the NADH-ubiquinone oxidoreductase chain 6 protein. This genetic change also has been found in people with LHON and a movement disorder called dystonia, which involves involuntary muscle contractions, tremors, and other uncontrolled movements. This mutation appears to disrupt the normal assembly or activity of complex I in mitochondria. It is not known, however, how this MT-ND6 gene alteration is related to the specific features of Leigh syndrome, LHON, or dystonia. It also remains unclear why a single mutation can cause such varied signs and symptoms in different people.

== Interactions ==
MT-ND6 interacts with the NADH dehydrogenase [ubiquinone] iron-sulfur protein 3 (NDUFS3) and the ATP-dependent metalloprotease YME1L1.
