= Cytochrome c oxidase subunit III =

Enzyme of the respiratory chain encoded by the mitochondrial genome

COX3

Identifiers
- Aliases: COX3, COIII, MTCO3, Cytochrome c oxidase subunit III, cytochrome c oxidase III
- External IDs: OMIM: 516050; MGI: 102502; GeneCards: COX3
Enzyme activity
EC #	BRENDA	ExPASy	KEGG	MetaCyc
7.1.1.9	↗	↗	↗	↗
Gene location (Human)
Chr.	Mitochondrial DNA (human)
Band	n/a	Start	9,207 bp
Band	n/a	End	9,990 bp
Gene location (Mouse)
Chr.	Mitochondrial DNA (mouse)
Band	n/a	Start	8,607 bp
Band	n/a	End	9,390 bp
RNA expression pattern
Bgee	Human / Mouse (ortholog); Top expressed in: gastric mucosa; skin of abdomen; skin of leg; left testis; right testis; mucosa of transverse colon; apex of heart; olfactory zone of nasal mucosa; amygdala; hippocampus proper / Top expressed in: quadriceps femoris muscle; right kidney; proximal tubule; duodenum; epiblast; ventricular zone; ganglionic eminence; zone of skin; jejunum; bone marrow; More reference expression data
BioGPS	n/a
Gene ontology
Molecular function	cytochrome-c oxidase activity; protein binding; electron transfer activity; oxidoreduction-driven active transmembrane transporter activity
Cellular component	integral component of membrane; mitochondrial inner membrane; respiratory chain complex IV; membrane; mitochondrion; mitochondrial respiratory chain complex IV
Biological process	proton transmembrane transport; aerobic electron transport chain; respiratory chain complex IV assembly; respiratory electron transport chain; mitochondrial electron transport, cytochrome c to oxygen; aerobic dissimilation; transmembrane transport
Sources:Amigo / QuickGO
Orthologs
Databases	NCBI: entry; OMA: entry
Species	Human	Mouse
Entrez	4514	17710
Ensembl	ENSG00000198938	ENSMUSG00000064358
UniProt	P00414	P00416
RefSeq (mRNA)	n/a	n/a
RefSeq (protein)	n/a	NP_904334
Location (UCSC)	Chr M: 0.01 – 0.01 Mb	Chr M: 0.01 – 0.01 Mb
PubMed search
- Wikidata
View/Edit Human	View/Edit Mouse

Location of the MT-CO3 gene in the human mitochondrial genome. MT-CO3 is one of the three cytochrome c oxidase subunit mitochondrial genes (orange boxes).

Cytochrome c oxidase subunit III
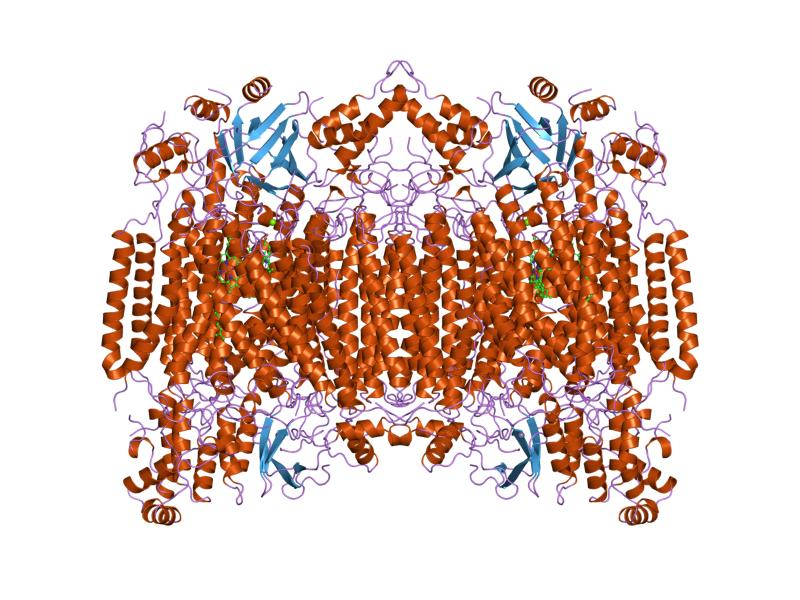
- Structure of the 13-subunit oxidized cytochrome c oxidase.

Identifiers
- Symbol: COX3
- Pfam: PF00510
- InterPro: IPR000298
- PROSITE: PDOC50253
- SCOP2: 1occ / SCOPe / SUPFAM
- TCDB: 3.D.4
- OPM superfamily: 4
- OPM protein: 1v55
- CDD: cd01665
Available protein structures:
- PDB: IPR000298 PF00510 (ECOD; PDBsum)
- AlphaFold: IPR000298; PF00510

Cytochrome c oxidase subunit III (COX3) is an enzyme that in humans is encoded by the MT-CO3 gene. It is one of main transmembrane subunits of cytochrome c oxidase. It is also one of the three mitochondrial DNA (mtDNA) encoded subunits (MT-CO1, MT-CO2, MT-CO3) of respiratory complex IV. Variants of it have been associated with isolated myopathy, severe encephalomyopathy, Leber hereditary optic neuropathy, mitochondrial complex IV deficiency, and recurrent myoglobinuria .

== Structure ==
The MT-CO3 gene produces a 30 kDa protein composed of 261 amino acids. COX3, the protein encoded by this gene, is a member of the cytochrome c oxidase subunit 3 family. This protein is located on the inner mitochondrial membrane. COX3 is a multi-pass transmembrane protein: in human, it contains 7 transmembrane domains at positions 15–35, 42–59, 81–101, 127–147, 159–179, 197–217, and 239–259.

== Function ==
Cytochrome c oxidase (EC 1.9.3.1) is the terminal enzyme of the respiratory chain of mitochondria and many aerobic bacteria. It catalyzes the transfer of electrons from reduced cytochrome c to molecular oxygen:

4 cytochrome c^{+2} + 4 H^{+} + O_{2} $\rightleftharpoons$ 4 cytochrome c^{+3} + 2 H_{2}O

This reaction is coupled to the pumping of four additional protons across the mitochondrial or bacterial membrane.

Cytochrome c oxidase is an oligomeric enzymatic complex that is located in the mitochondrial inner membrane of eukaryotes and in the plasma membrane of aerobic prokaryotes. The core structure of prokaryotic and eukaryotic cytochrome c oxidase contains three common subunits, I, II and III. In prokaryotes, subunits I and III can be fused and a fourth subunit is sometimes found, whereas in eukaryotes there are a variable number of additional small subunits.

As the bacterial respiratory systems are branched, they have a number of distinct terminal oxidases, rather than the single cytochrome c oxidase present in the eukaryotic mitochondrial systems. Although the cytochrome o oxidases do not catalyze the cytochrome c but the quinol (ubiquinol) oxidation they belong to the same haem-copper oxidase superfamily as cytochrome c oxidases. Members of this family share sequence similarities in all three core subunits: subunit I is the most conserved subunit, whereas subunit II is the least conserved.

== Clinical significance ==
Mutations in mtDNA-encoded cytochrome c oxidase subunit genes have been observed to be associated with isolated myopathy, severe encephalomyopathy, Leber hereditary optic neuropathy, mitochondrial complex IV deficiency, and recurrent myoglobinuria .

=== Leber hereditary optic neuropathy (LHON) ===
LHON is a maternally inherited disease resulting in acute or subacute loss of central vision, due to optic nerve dysfunction. Cardiac conduction defects and neurological defects have also been described in some patients. LHON results from primary mitochondrial DNA mutations affecting the respiratory chain complexes. Mutations at positions 9438 and 9804, which result in glycine-78 to serine and alanine-200 to threonine amino acid changes, have been associated with this disease.

=== Mitochondrial complex IV deficiency (MT-C4D) ===
Complex IV deficiency (COX deficiency) is a disorder of the mitochondrial respiratory chain with heterogeneous clinical manifestations, ranging from isolated myopathy to severe multisystem disease affecting several tissues and organs. Features include hypertrophic cardiomyopathy, hepatomegaly and liver dysfunction, hypotonia, muscle weakness, exercise intolerance, developmental delay, delayed motor development, mental retardation, lactic acidemia, encephalopathy, ataxia, and cardiac arrhythmia. Some affected individuals manifest a fatal hypertrophic cardiomyopathy resulting in neonatal death and a subset of patients manifest Leigh syndrome. The mutations G7970T and G9952A have been associated with this disease.

=== Recurrent myoglobinuria mitochondrial (RM-MT) ===
Recurrent myoglobinuria is characterized by recurrent attacks of rhabdomyolysis (necrosis or disintegration of skeletal muscle) associated with muscle pain and weakness, and followed by excretion of myoglobin in the urine. It has been associated with mitochondrial complex IV deficiency.

== Subfamilies ==
- Cytochrome o ubiquinol oxidase, subunit III InterPro: IPR014206
- Cytochrome aa3 quinol oxidase, subunit III InterPro: IPR014246

== Interactions ==
COX3 has been shown to have 15 binary protein-protein interactions including 8 co-complex interactions. COX3 appears to interact with SNCA, KRAS, RAC1, and HSPB2.
