= MT-TV (gene) =

Transfer RNA

mitochondrially encoded tRNA valine

Identifiers
- Symbol: MT-TV
- Alt. symbols: MTTV
- NCBI gene: 4577
- HGNC: 7500
- OMIM: 590105
- RefSeq: NC_001807

Other data
- Locus: Chr. MT

Mitochondrially encoded tRNA valine also known as MT-TV is a transfer RNA which in humans is encoded by the mitochondrial MT-TV gene.

== Structure ==
The MT-TV gene is located in the mitochondrial genome at position 1602 and it spans 69 base pairs. The structure of a tRNA molecule is a distinctive folded structure which contains three hairpin loops and resembles a three-leafed clover.

== Function ==
MT-TV is a small 69 nucleotide RNA (human mitochondrial map position 1602-1670) that transfers the amino acid valine to a growing polypeptide chain at the ribosome site of protein synthesis during translation.

In animals, more specifically vertebrates, MT-tRNA^{Val} performs an integral structural role for the mitoribosome by filling in the position of a missing 5S mitoribosomal RNA.

== Clinical significance ==
Mutations in MT-TV which impair oxidate phosphorylation result in mitochondrial encephalomyopathy, lactic acidosis, and stroke-like episodes (MELAS). MELAS is a rare mitochondrial disorder known to affect many parts of the body, especially the nervous system and the brain. Symptoms of MELAS include recurrent severe headaches, muscle weakness (myopathy), hearing loss, stroke-like episodes with a loss of consciousness, seizures, and other problems affecting the nervous system. Two specific mutations of 1642G>A and 1644G>A have been found to result in the disease.

Changes in the gene have also been associated with Leigh's syndrome, a progressive brain disorder characterized by vomiting, seizures, delayed development, muscle weakness, problems with movement, heart disease, kidney problems, and difficulty breathing. Symptoms typically appear in infancy or early childhood. A 1624C>T mutation has been linked to this disease.

Other clinical manifestations associated with MT-TV mutations have included recurrent migraine headaches, muscle weakness and poor coordination, hearing loss, learning disabilities, dementia, and more. It has not been found why such mutations cause symptoms of these diseases. A 1606A>G mutation resulted in ataxia accompanied by progressive seizures, mental deterioration, and hearing loss. Cardiomyopathy, which weakens and enlarges the heart muscle, has also been reported in a small number of affected individuals.
