= MT-ND4 =

Mitochondrial gene coding for a protein involved in the respiratory chain

Identifiers
- Aliases: MT-ND4, NADH dehydrogenase, subunit 4 (complex I), NADH dehydrogenase subunit 4, ND4
- External IDs: OMIM: 516003; MGI: 102498; GeneCards: MT-ND4
Enzyme activity
EC #	BRENDA	ExPASy	KEGG	MetaCyc
7.1.1.2	↗	↗	↗	↗
Gene location (Human)
Chr.	Mitochondrial DNA (human)
Band	n/a	Start	10,760 bp
Band	n/a	End	12,137 bp
Gene location (Mouse)
Chr.	Mitochondrial DNA (mouse)
Band	n/a	Start	10,167 bp
Band	n/a	End	11,544 bp
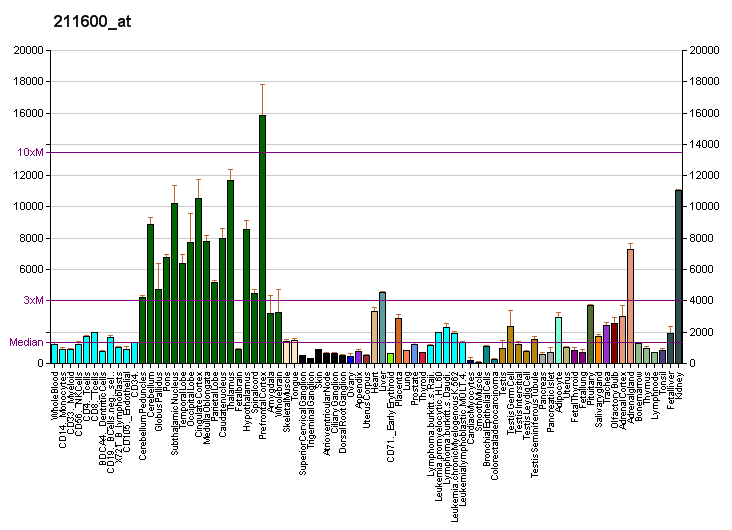
RNA expression pattern
Bgee	Human / Mouse (ortholog); Top expressed in: right uterine tube; apex of heart; right adrenal gland; right lung; left uterine tube; right adrenal cortex; left adrenal cortex; right testis; canal of the cervix; right ovary / Top expressed in: hypothalamus; dentate gyrus of hippocampal formation granule cell; primary visual cortex; superior frontal gyrus; cerebellar cortex; adrenal gland; hippocampus proper; zone of skin; striatum of neuraxis; human kidney; More reference expression data
BioGPS	More reference expression data
Gene ontology
Molecular function	NADH dehydrogenase (ubiquinone) activity; oxidoreductase activity; NADH dehydrogenase activity; ubiquinone binding
Cellular component	integral component of membrane; membrane; mitochondrial membranes; mitochondrial respiratory chain complex I; mitochondrion; mitochondrial inner membrane; respirasome
Biological process	response to hypoxia; response to nicotine; ageing; ATP synthesis coupled electron transport; in utero embryonic development; cerebellum development; mitochondrial respiratory chain complex I assembly; response to ethanol; mitochondrial electron transport, NADH to ubiquinone; aerobic dissimilation; electron transport coupled proton transport
Sources:Amigo / QuickGO
Orthologs
Databases	NCBI: entry; OMA: entry
Species	Human	Mouse
Entrez	4538	17719
Ensembl	ENSG00000198886	ENSMUSG00000064363
UniProt	P03905	P03911
RefSeq (mRNA)	n/a	n/a
RefSeq (protein)	n/a	NP_904337
Location (UCSC)	Chr M: 0.01 – 0.01 Mb	Chr M: 0.01 – 0.01 Mb
PubMed search
- Wikidata
View/Edit Human	View/Edit Mouse

Location of the MT-ND4 gene in the human mitochondrial genome. MT-ND4 is one of the seven NADH dehydrogenase mitochondrial genes (yellow boxes).

MT-ND4 is a gene of the mitochondrial genome coding for the NADH-ubiquinone oxidoreductase chain 4 (ND4) protein. The ND4 protein is a subunit of NADH dehydrogenase (ubiquinone), which is located in the mitochondrial inner membrane and is the largest of the five complexes of the electron transport chain. Variations in the MT-ND4 gene are associated with age-related macular degeneration (AMD), Leber's hereditary optic neuropathy (LHON), mesial temporal lobe epilepsy (MTLE) and cystic fibrosis.

== Structure ==
The MT-ND4 gene is located in human mitochondrial DNA from base pair 10,760 to 12,137. The MT-ND4 gene produces a 52 kDa protein composed of 459 amino acids. MT-ND4 is one of seven mitochondrial genes encoding subunits of the enzyme NADH dehydrogenase (ubiquinone), together with MT-ND1, MT-ND2, MT-ND3, MT-ND4L, MT-ND5, and MT-ND6. Also known as Complex I, this enzyme is the largest of the respiratory complexes. The structure is L-shaped with a long, hydrophobic transmembrane domain and a hydrophilic domain for the peripheral arm that includes all the known redox centres and the NADH binding site. MT-ND4 and the rest of the mitochondrially encoded subunits are the most hydrophobic of the subunits of Complex I and form the core of the transmembrane region.

An unusual feature of the human MT-ND4 gene is the 7-nucleotide gene overlap of its first three codons (5'-ATG CTA AAA-3' coding for amino acids Met-Leu-Lys) with the last three codons of the MT-ND4L gene (5'-CAA TGC TAA-3' coding for Gln, Cys and Stop). With respect to the MT-ND4L reading frame (+1), the MT-ND4 gene starts in the +3 reading frame: [CAA][TGC][TAA]AA versus CA[ATG][CTA][AAA].

== Function ==
MT-ND4 is a subunit of the respiratory chain Complex I that is believed to belong to the minimal assembly of core proteins required to catalyze NADH dehydrogenation and electron transfer to ubiquinone (coenzyme Q10). Initially, NADH binds to Complex I and transfers two electrons to the isoalloxazine ring of the flavin mononucleotide (FMN) prosthetic arm to form FMNH_{2}. The electrons are transferred through a series of iron-sulfur (Fe-S) clusters in the prosthetic arm and finally to coenzyme Q10 (CoQ), which is reduced to ubiquinol (CoQH_{2}). The flow of electrons changes the redox state of the protein, resulting in a conformational change and pK shift of the ionizable side chain, which pumps four hydrogen ions out of the mitochondrial matrix.

Studies in cystic fibrosis cases suggest that MT-ND4 expression is indirectly upregulated by the cystic fibrosis transmembrane conductance regulator (CFTR) channel chloride transport activity. Channel flow double-electrode (CFDE) cells ectopically expressing wild-type CFTR channels were used to test the effect of CFTR chloride transport inhibitors glibenclamide and CFTR(inh)172 and demonstrated a reduction in MT-ND4 expression.

== Clinical significance ==
MT-ND4 contains one of five mitochondrial single-nucleotide polymorphisms (SNPs) associated with age-related macular degeneration (AMD) in Mexican Americans, mt12007.

Leber's hereditary optic neuropathy (LHON) correlates with a mutation in the MT-ND4 gene in multiple families. The mutation at codon 340 results in the elimination of an Sfa NI site by the conversion of a highly conserved arginine to a histidine. This provides a simple diagnostic test by which to identify LHON, a maternally inherited disease that results in optic nerve degeneration and cardiac dysrythmia.

Amino acid changes in MT-ND4, MT-ND5 and MT-ATP8 resulting from mutations at the 11994, 8502 and 13,231 bp of mtDNA are significantly correlated in mesial temporal lobe epilepsy (MTLE) patients with hippocampal sclerosis. The 11994 C>T mutation to the MT-ND4 gene results in a Thr to Ile shift at the 412 position. Genome analysis has never been used in MTLE cases and could provide another diagnostic method in the disease.

MT-ND4 is downregulated in cystic fibrosis, a disease that results from mutations in the cystic fibrosis transmembrane conductance regulator (CFTR) channel.

== Interactions ==
MT-ND4 has been shown to have 21 binary protein-protein interactions including 15 co-complex interactions. MT-ND4 appears to interact with SP1, ZNF16, CTCF, GRB2, and ATM.
