= MELAS syndrome =

Mitochondrial disease

Mitochondrial myopathy, encephalomyopathy, lactic acidosis, and stroke-like episodes
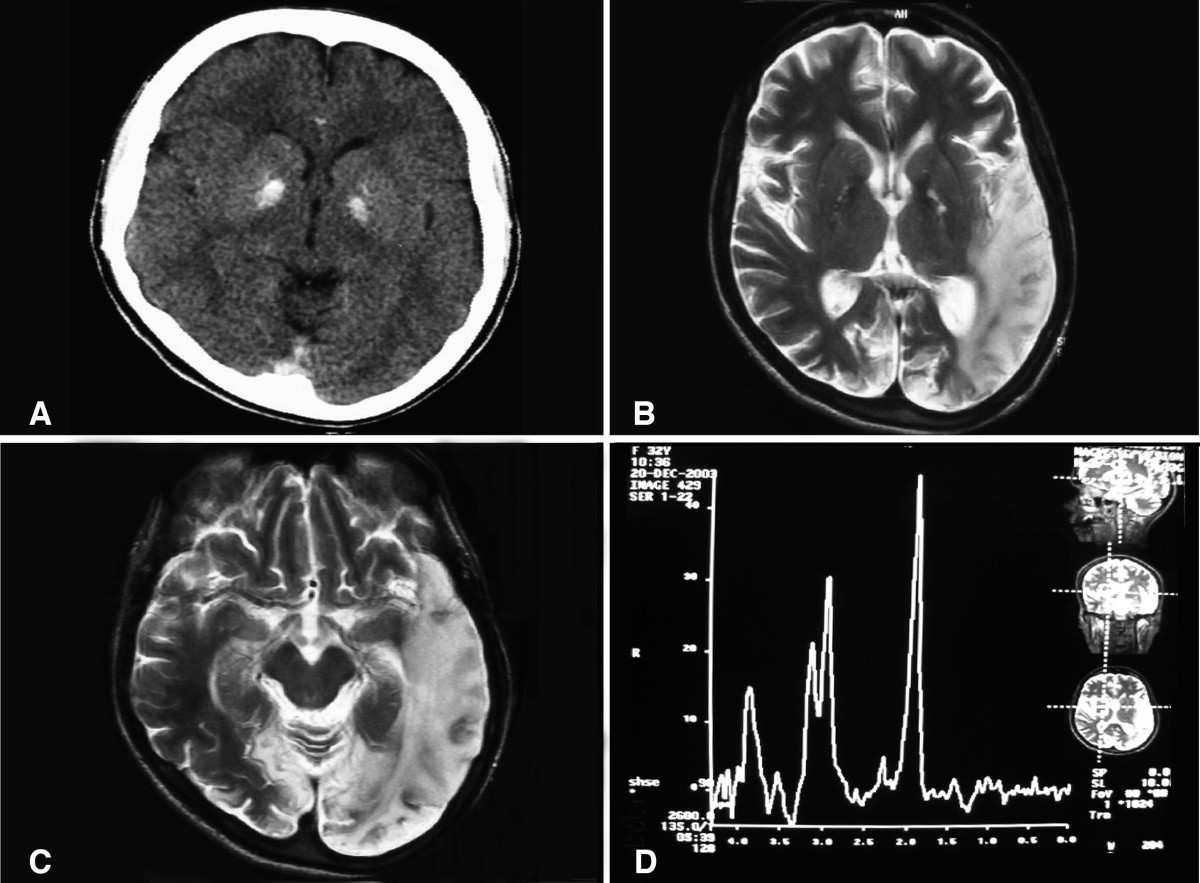
- Basal ganglia calcification, cerebellar atrophy, increased lactate; a CT image of a person diagnosed with MELAS
- Specialty: Neurology
- Frequency: 1 in 4000

MELAS (Mitochondrial Encephalomyopathy, Lactic Acidosis, and Stroke-like episodes) is one of the family of mitochondrial diseases, which also include MIDD (maternally inherited diabetes and deafness), MERRF syndrome, and Leber's hereditary optic neuropathy. It was first characterized under this name in 1984. A feature of these diseases is that they are caused by defects in the mitochondrial genome which is inherited purely from the female parent. The most common MELAS mutation is one in mitochondrial DNA (mtDNA) referred to as m.3243A>G.

== Signs and symptoms ==
MELAS is a condition that affects many of the body's systems, particularly the brain and nervous system (encephalo-) and muscles (myopathy). As such, it is commonly referred to as a mitochondrial encephalomyopathy, due to the co-occurrence of these pathologies. In most cases, the signs and symptoms of this disorder appear in childhood following a period of normal development. Children with MELAS often have normal early psychomotor development until the onset of symptoms between 2 and 10 years old. Though less common, infantile onset may occur and may present as failure to thrive, growth retardation and progressive deafness. Onset in older children typically presents as recurrent attacks of a migraine-like headache, anorexia, vomiting, and seizures. Children with MELAS are also frequently found to have short stature.

Most people with MELAS have a buildup of lactic acid in their bodies, a condition called lactic acidemia. Increased acidity in the blood can lead to vomiting, abdominal pain, extreme tiredness (fatigue), muscle weakness, loss of bowel control, and difficulty breathing. Less commonly, people with MELAS may experience involuntary muscle spasms (myoclonus), impaired muscle coordination (ataxia), hearing loss, heart and kidney problems, diabetes, epilepsy, and hormonal imbalances. Lactic acidemia also promotes mitochondrial dysfunction, one of the hallmarks of MELAS pathophysiology.

== Differential diagnosis ==
The presentation of some cases is similar to that of Kearns–Sayre syndrome.

Myoclonus epilepsy associated with ragged red fibers (MERRF) may be confused with MELAS as they both involve seizures, mental deterioration, and myopathy with ragged red fibers on biopsy. MERRF patients may also have hearing loss, visual disturbance secondary to optic atrophy, and short stature. The characteristic myoclonic seizure in MERRF may help to narrow diagnosis, but genetic testing should be considered to distinguish the two conditions.

Leigh syndrome may also present with progressive neurological deterioration, seizures, and vomiting, mainly in young children.

== Genetics ==
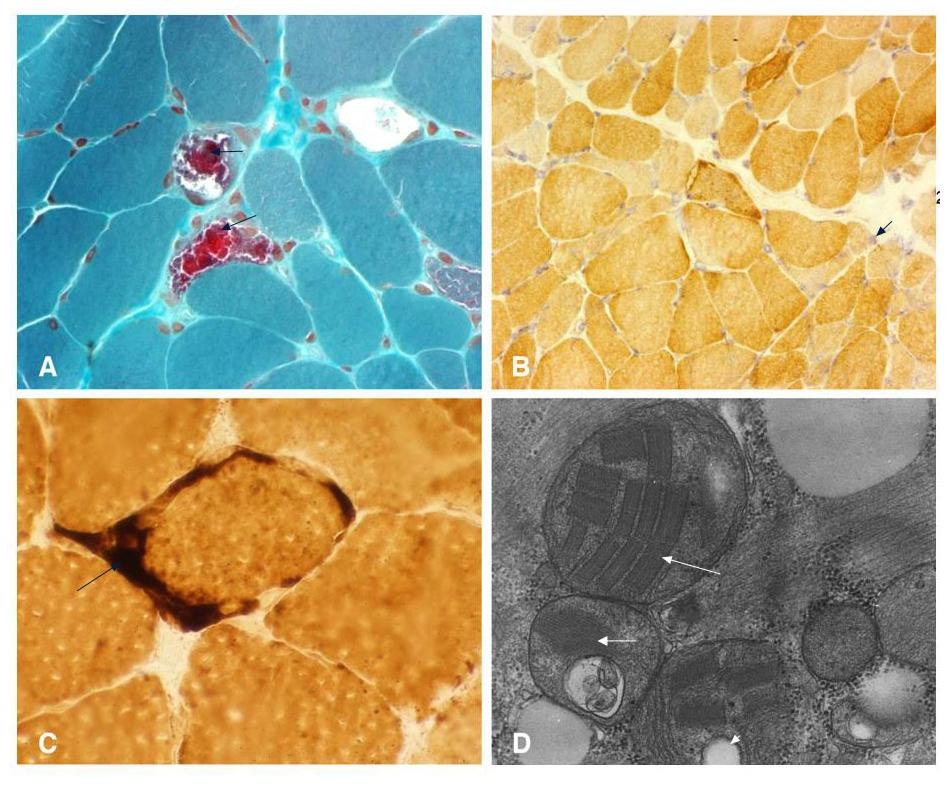
Muscle biopsy of a person diagnosed with MELAS but carrying no known mutation. (a) Modified Gomori trichrome stain showing several ragged red fibers (arrowhead). (b) Cytochrome c oxidase stain showing Type-1 lightly stained and Type II fibers, darker fibers, and a few fibers with abnormal collections of mitochondria (arrowhead). Note cytochrome c oxidase negative fibers as usually seen in mitochondrial encephalopathy, lactic acidosis and stroke-like episodes (MELAS). (c) Succinate dehydrogenase staining showing a few ragged blue fibers and intense staining in the mitochondria of the blood vessels (arrow). (d) Electron microscopy showing abnormal collection of mitochondria with paracrystalline inclusions (arrowhead), osmiophilic inclusions (large arrowhead) and mitochondrial vacuoles (small arrowhead).

MELAS is mostly caused by mutations in the genes in mitochondrial DNA, but it can also be caused by mutations in the nuclear DNA.

=== NADH dehydrogenase ===
Some of the genes (MT-ND1, MT-ND5) affected in MELAS encode proteins that are part of NADH dehydrogenase (also called complex I) in mitochondria, that helps convert oxygen and simple sugars to energy.

=== Transfer RNAs ===
Other genes (MT-TH, MT-TL1, and MT-TV) encode mitochondrial specific transfer RNAs (tRNAs).

Mutations in the mitochondrial MT-TL1 gene cause more than 80 percent of all cases of MELAS. This gene encodes a tRNA specific to the amino acid Leucine. These mutations impair the ability of mitochondria to make proteins, use oxygen, and produce energy. Researchers have not determined how changes in mitochondrial DNA lead to the specific signs and symptoms of MELAS. They continue to investigate the effects of mitochondrial gene mutations in different tissues, particularly in the brain.

=== Inheritance ===
This condition is inherited in a mitochondrial pattern, which is also known as maternal inheritance and heteroplasmy. This pattern of inheritance applies to genes contained in mitochondrial DNA. Because egg cells, but not sperm cells, contribute mitochondria to the developing embryo, only females pass mitochondrial conditions to their children. Mitochondrial disorders can appear in every generation of a family and can affect both males and females, but fathers do not pass mitochondrial traits to their children. In most cases, people with MELAS inherit an altered mitochondrial gene from their mother. Less commonly, the disorder results from a new mutation in a mitochondrial gene and occurs in people with no family history of MELAS.

Although first recognised and described in 1984 the condition occurred well before that date. Josiah Wedgwood gave detailed description of this illness in his youngest daughter, Mary Ann Wedgwood (1778–1786). Her illness may provide a link to the illnesses that afflicted her elder brother, Thomas Wedgwood, her eldest sister Susannah Darwin, and Susannah's second son, the famous naturalist, Charles Darwin. The illnesses that afflicted the Wedgwood-Darwin families have a well defined matrilineal inheritance pattern.

== Diagnosis ==
Genetic testing for the m.3243A>G mutation in mitochondrial DNA is commonly used to isolate the diagnosis of MELAS syndrome from other mitochondrial disorders. This mutation is an adenine to guanine point mutation at base pair 3,243 in the mitochondrial genome. A minimum amount of mtDNA must be mutated to generate the MELAS phenotype, known as the "threshold effect". Due to mitochondrial heteroplasmy, urine and blood testing is preferable to blood alone. PCR and ARMS-PCR are commonly used, reliable, rapid, and cost-effective techniques for the diagnosis of MELAS.

Magnetic-resonance imaging (MRI) is a common imaging test used to identify the presence of stroke-like lesions. These lesions are multifocal infarct-like areas of cortical edema in different stages of ischemic evolution, yet do not commonly conform to any known vascular territory, distinguishing them from a stroke. Initial lesions often occur in the occipital or parietal lobes with eventual involvement of the cerebellum, cerebral cortex, basal ganglia, and thalamus. The occipital lobe is thought to be a region prone to stroke-like lesions due to the high energy requirements of the visual cortex.

Lactate levels are often elevated in serum and cerebrospinal fluid. Magnetic resonance spectroscopy (MRS) may show an elevated lactate peak in affected and even unaffected brain areas. Muscle biopsy shows ragged red fibers. However, genetic evaluation should be done first, which eliminates the need for muscle biopsy in most cases. Diagnosis may be molecular or clinical:

- Stroke-like episodes before or after 40 years old
- Encephalopathy with seizures or dementia
- Blood lactic acidosis* or ragged red fibers on muscle biopsy

Sensorineural hearing loss and mitochondrial diabetes are common features. Eyes may have a distinctive speckled pigment in the retina, referred to as a maculopathy. Family members may present differently.

== Treatment ==
There is no curative treatment. The disease remains progressive and fatal. Current treatment focuses on managing stroke-like episodes, seizures, or other complications, and is aimed towards improving mitochondrial function through both pharmacological and non-pharmacological methods.

Multiple case studies have suggested that implementation of the Ketogenic diet may help reduce the incidence of stroke-like episodes associated with MELAS, one of the most common clinical features. Ketogenic diet therapy helps with the clearance of reactive-oxygen species (ROS), which commonly accumulate and harm the mitochondria in MELAS. However, there is not enough data to consider it an established treatment.

Other supplementation treatments have been studied:

- Combination therapy with creatine monohydrate, CoQ10, and lipoic acid was shown to improve "surrogate markers of cellular energy dysfunction" in some patients with different forms of mitochondrial cytopathies, including MELAS patients.
- The administration of L-arginine during acute stroke-like episodes has been shown to "[decrease] severity of stroke-like symptoms in MELAS, [enhance] dynamics of the microcirculation, and also [reduce] tissue injury from ischemia."
- High-dose taurine supplementation was used in a phase III clinical trial in which therapy was shown to "reduce the annual relapse rate of stroke-like episodes from 2.22 to 0.72". Taurine supplementation promotes resurgence of normal metabolic activity through the modulation of calcium homeostasis in dysfunctional mitochondria.

== Epidemiology ==
The exact incidence of MELAS is unknown. It is one of the more common conditions in a group known as mitochondrial diseases. Nation-wide studies from Japan and Finland have suggested a prevalence of 1 in 500,000 people and 16 in 100,000 people, respectively. Together, mitochondrial diseases occur in about 1 in 4,000 people.

== See also ==
- Mitochondrial myopathy
