= Leigh syndrome =

Metabolic disease

- Other names: Juvenile subacute necrotizing encephalomyelopathy, Leigh disease, infantile subacute necrotizing encephalomyelopathy, subacute necrotizing encephalomyelopathy (SNEM)
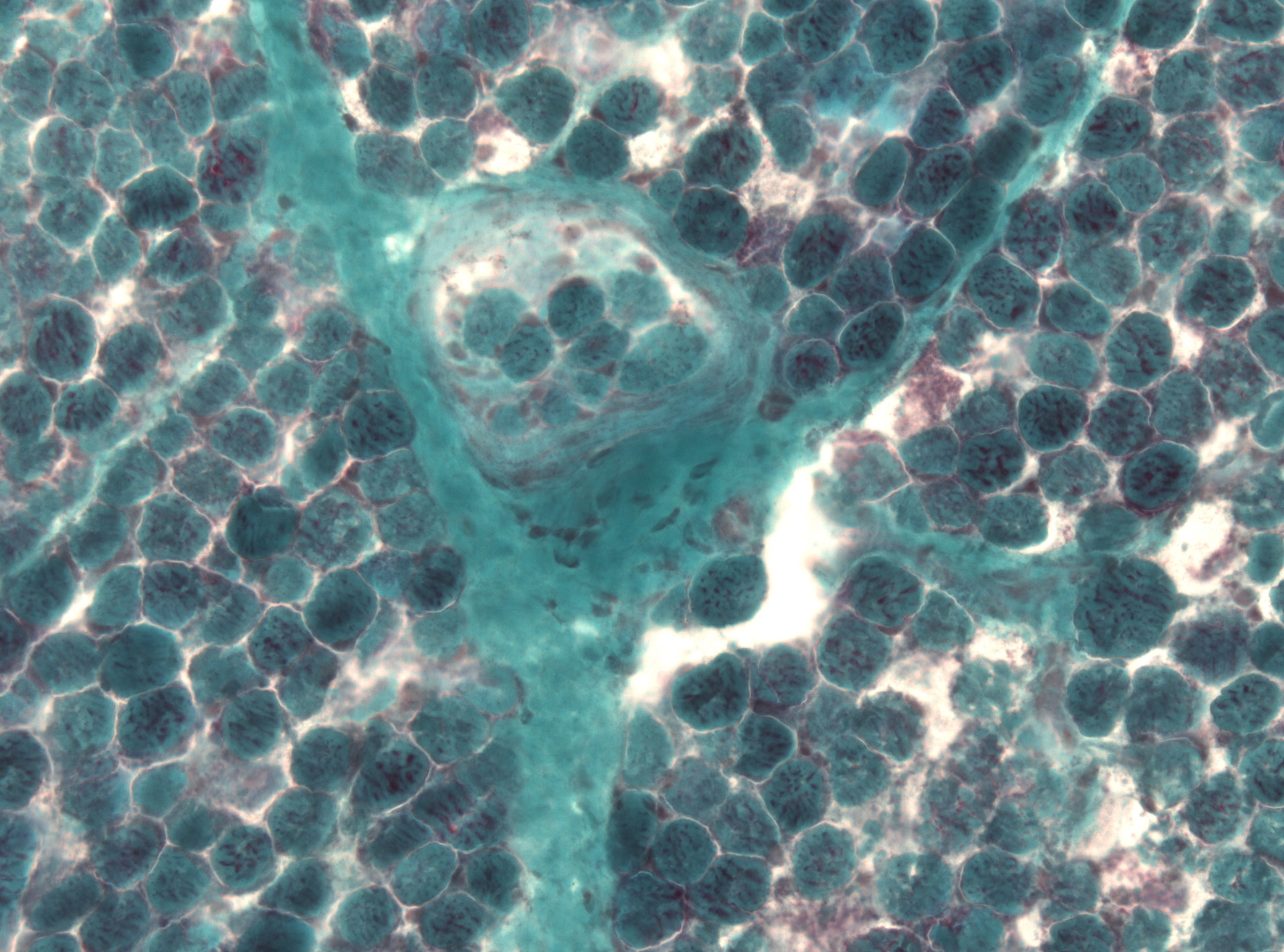
- Detection of numerous ragged red fibers in a muscle biopsy
- Specialty: Neurology

Leigh syndrome (also called Leigh disease and subacute necrotizing encephalomyelopathy) is an inherited neurometabolic disorder that affects the central nervous system. It is named after Archibald Denis Leigh, a British neuropsychiatrist who first described the condition in 1951. Normal levels of thiamine, thiamine monophosphate, and thiamine diphosphate are commonly found, but there is a reduced or absent level of thiamine triphosphate. This is thought to be caused by a blockage in the enzyme thiamine-diphosphate kinase, and therefore treatment in some patients would be to take thiamine triphosphate daily. While the majority of patients typically exhibit symptoms between the ages of 3 and 12 months, instances of adult onset have also been documented.

== Signs and symptoms ==
The symptoms of Leigh syndrome were classically described as beginning in infancy and leading to death within a span of several years; however, as more cases are recognized, it is apparent that symptoms can emerge at any age—including adolescence or adulthood—and patients can survive for many years following diagnosis. Symptoms are often first seen after a triggering event that taxes the body's energy production, such as an infection or surgery. The general course of Leigh syndrome is one of episodic developmental regression during times of metabolic stress. Some patients have long periods without disease progression while others develop progressive decline.

Infants with the syndrome have symptoms that include diarrhea, vomiting, and dysphagia (trouble swallowing or sucking), leading to a failure to thrive. Children with early Leigh disease also may appear irritable and cry much more than healthy babies. Seizures are often seen, with reported prevalence of seizures in Leigh syndrome that ranges from 40% to 79%. Excess lactate may be seen in the urine, cerebrospinal fluid, and blood of a person with Leigh syndrome.

As the disease progresses, the muscular system is debilitated throughout the body, as the brain cannot control the contraction of muscles. Hypotonia (low muscle tone and strength), dystonia (involuntary, sustained muscle contraction), and ataxia (lack of control over movement) are often seen in people with Leigh disease. The eyes are particularly affected; the muscles that control the eyes become weak, paralyzed, or uncontrollable in conditions called ophthalmoparesis (weakness or paralysis) and nystagmus (involuntary eye movements). Slow saccades are also sometimes seen. The heart and lungs can also fail as a result of Leigh disease. Hypertrophic cardiomyopathy (thickening of part of the heart muscle) is also sometimes found and can cause death; asymmetric septal hypertrophy has also been associated with Leigh syndrome. In children with Leigh-syndrome associated ventricular septal defects, caused by pyruvate dehydrogenase deficiency, high forehead and large ears are seen; facial abnormalities are not typical of Leigh syndrome.

However, respiratory failure is the most common cause of death in people with Leigh syndrome. Other neurological symptoms include peripheral neuropathy, loss of sensation in extremities caused by damage to the peripheral nervous system.

Hypertrichosis is seen in Leigh syndrome caused by mutations in the nuclear gene SURF1.

== Genomics ==
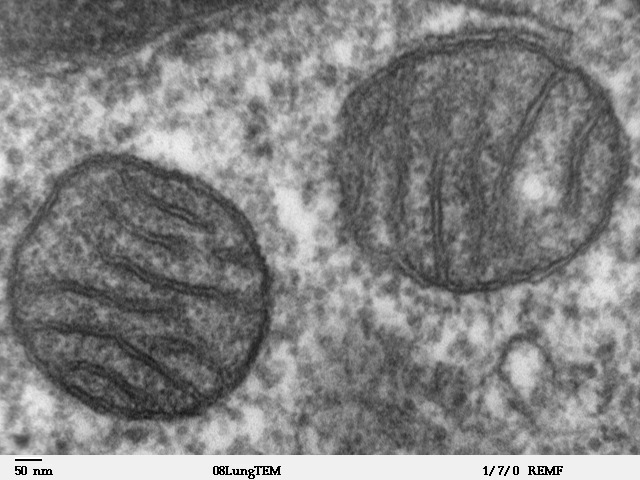
Two healthy mitochondria from mammalian lung tissue as shown by electron microscopy

Mutations in mitochondrial DNA (mtDNA) and over 30 genes in nuclear DNA (gene SURF1 and some COX assembly factors) have been implicated in Leigh disease.

Disorders of oxidative phosphorylation, the process by which cells produce their main energy source of adenosine triphosphate (ATP), may be caused by mutations in either mtDNA or in nuclear encoded genes. The latter account for the majority of Leigh disease, although it is not always possible to identify the specific mutation responsible for the condition in a particular individual. Four out of the five protein complexes involved in oxidative phosphorylation are most commonly disrupted in Leigh syndrome, either because of malformed protein or because of an error in the assembly of these complexes. Regardless of the genetic basis, it results in an inability of the complexes affected by the mutation to perform their role in oxidative phosphorylation. In the case of Leigh disease, crucial cells in the brain stem and basal ganglia are affected. This causes a chronic lack of energy in the cells, which leads to cell death and in turn, affects the central nervous system and inhibits motor functions. The heart and other muscles also require a significant amount of energy and are affected by cell death caused by chronic energy deficiencies in Leigh syndrome.

=== Mitochondrial DNA mutations ===
Mitochondria are essential organelles in eukaryotic cells. Their function is to convert the potential energy of glucose, amino acids, and fatty acids into adenosine triphosphate (ATP) in a process called oxidative phosphorylation. Mitochondria carry their own DNA, called mitochondrial DNA (mtDNA). The information stored in the mtDNA is used to produce several of the enzymes essential to the production of ATP.

Between 20 and 25 percent of Leigh syndrome cases are caused by mutations in mitochondrial DNA. The most common of these mutations is found in 10 to 20 percent of Leigh syndrome and occurs in MT-ATP6, a gene that codes for a protein in the last complex of the oxidative phosphorylation chain, ATP synthase, an enzyme that directly generates ATP. Without ATP synthase, the electron transport chain will not produce any ATP. The most common MT-ATP6 mutation found with Leigh syndrome is a point mutation at nucleotide 8993 that changes a thymine to a guanine. This and other point mutations associated with Leigh syndrome destabilize or malform the protein complex and keep energy production down in affected cells. Several mitochondrial genes involved in creating the first complex of the oxidative phosphorylation chain can be implicated in a case of Leigh syndrome, including genes MT-ND2, MT-ND3, MT-ND5, MT-ND6 and MT-CO1.

Mitochondrial DNA is passed down matrilineally in a pattern called maternal inheritance—a mother can transmit the genes for Leigh syndrome to both male and female children, but fathers cannot pass down mitochondrial genes.

=== Nuclear DNA mutations ===
The autosomal recessive pattern of inheritance seen in some cases of Leigh syndrome

Nuclear DNA comprises most of the genome of an organism and in sexually reproducing organisms is inherited from both parents, in contrast to mitochondrial DNA's maternal pattern of inheritance. Leigh syndrome caused by nuclear DNA mutations is inherited in an autosomal recessive pattern. This means that two copies of the mutated gene are required to cause the disease, so two unaffected parents, each of whom carries one mutant allele, can have an affected child if that child inherits the mutant allele from both parents.

75 to 80 percent of Leigh syndrome is caused by mutations in nuclear DNA; mutations affecting the function or assembly of the fourth complex involved in oxidative phosphorylation, cytochrome c oxidase (COX), cause most cases of Leigh disease. Mutations in a gene called SURF1 (surfeit1) are the most common cause of this subtype of Leigh syndrome. The protein that SURF1 codes for is terminated early and therefore cannot perform its function, shepherding the subunits of COX together into a functional protein complex. This results in a deficit of COX protein, reducing the amount of energy produced by mitochondria. SURF1 is located on the long arm of chromosome 9. Some types of SURF1 mutations cause a subtype of Leigh syndrome that has a particularly late onset but similarly variable clinical course. Another nuclear DNA mutation that causes Leigh syndrome, gene DLD, affects another protein complex in the mitochondria, the pyruvate dehydrogenase complex.

Other nuclear genes associated with Leigh syndrome are located on chromosome 2 (BCS1L and NDUFA10); chromosome 5 (SDHA, NDUFS4, NDUFAF2, and NDUFA2); chromosome 8 (NDUFAF6), chromosome 10 (COX15); chromosome 11 (NDUFS3, NDUFS8, and FOXRED1); chromosome 12 (NDUFA9 and NDUFA12); and chromosome 19 (NDUFS7). SDHA is the only nuclear-coded protein present in the mitochondrial electron transport chain (as complex II), and Mitochondrial complex II deficiency, in its biallelic form, causes Leigh syndrome. Many of these genes affect the first oxidative phosphorylation complex.

=== X-linked Leigh syndrome ===
The X-linked recessive pattern of inheritance seen occasionally in cases of Leigh syndrome

Leigh syndrome can also be caused by deficiency of the pyruvate dehydrogenase complex (PDHC), the x-linked gene being PDHA1. In general, there are two major presentations of PDH deficiency, metabolic and neurologic, which occur at equal frequency. The metabolic form presents as severe lactic acidosis in the newborn period, and many die as newborns. Patients with the neurologic presentation are hypotonic (low muscle tone), feed poorly, lethargic, and develop seizures, intellectual disability, microcephaly, blindness and spasticity secondary to contractures. "Between these two extremes, there is a continuous spectrum of intermediate forms...A number of patients with primarily neurological symptoms fit into the category of Leigh's syndrome."

X-linked recessive Leigh syndrome affects male children far more often than female children because they only have one copy of the X chromosome. Female children would need two copies of the faulty gene to be affected by X-linked Leigh syndrome.

=== French Canadian Leigh syndrome ===
The type of Leigh syndrome found at a much higher rate in the Saguenay–Lac-Saint-Jean region of Quebec is caused by a mutation in the LRPPRC gene, located on the small ('p') arm of chromosome 2. Both compound heterozygosity and homozygous mutations have been observed in French Canadian Leigh syndrome. This subtype of the disease was first described in 1993 in 34 children from the region, all of whom had a severe deficiency in cytochrome c oxidase (COX), the fourth complex in the mitochondrial electron transport chain. Though the subunits of the protein found in affected cells were functional, they were not properly assembled. The deficiency was found to be almost complete in brain and liver tissues and substantial (approximately 50% of normal enzyme activity) in fibroblasts (connective tissue cells) and skeletal muscle. Kidney and heart tissues were found to not have a COX deficiency.

French Canadian Leigh syndrome has similar symptoms to other types of Leigh syndrome. The age of onset is, on average, 5 months and the median age of death is 1 year and 7 months. Children with the disease are developmentally delayed, have mildly dysmorphic facial features, including hypoplasia of the midface and wide nasal bridge, chronic metabolic acidosis, and hypotonia (decreased muscular strength). Other symptoms include tachypnea (unusually quick breathing rate), poor sucking ability, hypoglycemia (low blood sugar), and tremors. Severe, sudden metabolic acidosis is a common cause of mortality.

Estimates of the rate of genetic carriers in the Saguenay–Lac-Saint-Jean region range from 1 in 23 to 1 in 28; the number of children born with the disease has been estimated at 1 in 2063 to 1 in 2473 live births. Genealogic studies suggest that the responsible mutation was introduced to the region by early European settlers.

== Pathophysiology ==
The characteristic symptoms of Leigh syndrome are at least partially caused by bilateral, focal lesions in the brainstem, basal ganglia, cerebellum, and other regions of the brain. The lesions take on different forms, including areas of demyelination, spongiosis, gliosis, necrosis, and capillary proliferation. Demyelination is the loss of the myelin sheath around the axons of neurons, inhibiting their ability to communicate with other neurons. The brain stem is involved in maintaining basic life functions such as breathing, swallowing, and circulation; the basal ganglia and cerebellum control movement and balance. Damage to these areas therefore results in the major symptoms of Leigh syndrome—loss of control over functions controlled by these areas.

The lactic acidosis sometimes associated with Leigh syndrome is caused by the buildup of pyruvate, which is unable to be processed in individuals with certain types of oxidative phosphorylation deficiencies. The pyruvate is either converted into alanine via alanine aminotransferase or converted into lactic acid by lactate dehydrogenase; both of these substances can then build up in the body.

== Diagnosis ==
Leigh syndrome is suggested by clinical findings and confirmed with laboratory and genetic testing.

=== Clinical findings ===
Dystonia, nystagmus, and problems with the autonomic nervous system suggest damage to the basal ganglia and brain stem potentially caused by Leigh syndrome. Other symptoms are also indicative of brain damage, such as hypertrichosis and neurologically caused deafness. Laboratory findings of lactic acidosis or acidemia and hyperalaninemia (elevated levels of alanine in the blood) can also suggest Leigh syndrome. Assessing the level of organic acids in urine can also indicate a dysfunction in the metabolic pathway.

=== Differential diagnosis ===
Other diseases can have a similar clinical presentation to Leigh syndrome; excluding other causes of similar clinical symptoms is often a first step to diagnosing Leigh syndrome. Conditions that can appear similar to Leigh disease include perinatal asphyxia, kernicterus, carbon monoxide poisoning, methanol toxicity, thiamine deficiency, Wilson's disease, biotin-thiamine-responsive basal ganglia disease (BTBGD), and some forms of encephalitis. Perinatal asphyxia can cause bilateral ganglial lesions and damage to the thalamus, which are similar to the signs seen with Leigh syndrome. When hyperbilirubinemia is not treated with phototherapy, the bilirubin can accumulate in the basal ganglia and cause lesions similar to those seen in Leigh syndrome. This is not common since the advent of phototherapy.

== Treatment ==
Succinic acid has been studied, and shown effective for both Leigh syndrome, and MELAS syndrome. A high-fat, low-carbohydrate diet may be followed if a gene on the X chromosome is implicated in an individual's Leigh syndrome. Thiamine (vitamin B_{1}) may be given if pyruvate dehydrogenase deficiency is known or suspected. The symptoms of lactic acidosis are treated by supplementing the diet with sodium bicarbonate (baking soda) or sodium citrate, but these substances do not treat the cause of Leigh syndrome. Dichloroacetate may also be effective in treating Leigh syndrome-associated lactic acidosis; research is ongoing on this substance. Coenzyme Q10 supplements have been seen to improve symptoms in some cases.

Clinical trials of the drug EPI-743 for Leigh syndrome are ongoing.

In 2016, John Zhang and his team at New Hope Fertility Center in New York, USA, performed a spindle transfer mitochondrial donation technique on a mother in Mexico who was at risk of producing a baby with Leigh disease. A healthy boy was born on 6 April 2016. However, it is not yet certain if the technique is completely reliable and safe.

== Prognosis ==
Different genetic causes and types of Leigh syndrome have different prognoses, though all are poor. The most severe forms of the disease, caused by a full deficiency in one of the affected proteins, cause death at a few years of age. If the deficiency is not complete, the prognosis is somewhat better and an affected child is expected to survive 6–7 years, and in rare cases, to their teenage years.

== Epidemiology ==
Leigh syndrome occurs in at least 1 of 40,000 live births, though certain populations have much higher rates. In the Saguenay–Lac-Saint-Jean region of central Quebec, Leigh syndrome occurs at a rate of 1 in 2000 newborns.

== History ==
Leigh syndrome was first described by Denis Leigh in 1951 and distinguished from similar Wernicke's encephalopathy in 1954. In 1968, the disease's link with mitochondrial activity was first ascertained, though the mutations in cytochrome c oxidase and other electron transport chain proteins were not discovered until 1977.

== See also ==
- Joseph Maraachli case
- Neuropathy, ataxia, and retinitis pigmentosa
