= Streptomyces libani =

Scientific classification
- Domain: Bacteria
- Kingdom: Bacillati
- Phylum: Actinomycetota
- Class: Actinomycetes
- Order: Streptomycetales
- Family: Streptomycetaceae
- Genus: Streptomyces
- Species: S. libani

Binomial name
- Streptomyces libani Baldacci and Grein 1966 (Approved Lists 1980)

Type strain
- ATCC 23732, Baldacci 2343 FI, Baldacci2343F1, BCRC 15196, CBS 753.72, CCRC 15196, CMI 130777, DSM 40555, DSM 41227, IFO 13452, IPV 1945, ISP 5555, ISP 55555, JCM 4322, JCM 4781, KCC S-0322, KCC S-0781, KCCS- 0322, KCCS-0781, KCTC 9113, NBRC 13452, NCAIM B.01474, NCIB 11012, NCIMB 11012, NRRL B-3446, NRRL-ISP 5555, RIA 1413, VKM Ac-1905

Subspecies
- subsp. libani Baldacci and Grein 1966 (Approved Lists 1980); subsp. "rubropurpureus" Iwami et al. 1986

Synonyms
- Streptomyces libani subsp. rufus Baldacci and Grein 1966 (Approved Lists 1980)

Species of bacterium

Streptomyces libani is a bacterium species from the genus of Streptomyces which was isolated from soil from Byblos in Lebanon. Streptomyces libani produces libanomycin, 4-thiouridine and oligomycin A.

== See also ==
- List of Streptomyces species
