= RegB/RegA two-component system =

Metabolic regulator in some bacteria

The RegB/RegA two-component system, also known as the REG regulon, is a two-component regulatory system found in Rhodobacter capsulatus, Rhodobacter sphaeroides, and many other species of purple photosynthetic bacteria. It functions as a global metabolic regulator and consists of two parts: RegB and RegA. Together, they work to control the synthesis of energy through various processes in the bacteria where they are present. Some of these processes include: photosynthesis, carbon fixation, nitrogen fixation, hydrogen utilization, aerobic and anaerobic respiration, denitrification, electron transport and aerotaxis.

== Discovery ==
Initially, the RegB/RegA two component system was discovered through its ability to regulate gene expression seen in photosynthesis. Now, due to subsequent research, it is believed that this two component system functions, in a more broadly sense, as a regulator of processes involving energy.

== RegB ==
RegB is a histidine sensor kinase whose main purpose is to detect signals released from the respiratory chain to regulate photosystem biosynthesis. It is also involved in the regulation of the cbbI and cbbII CO_{2} fixation operons in the Calvin cycle, and other CO_{2} fixation pathways.

== RegA ==
RegA is a response regulator that controls multiple synthesis and regulation functions in the cell. It helps to control the terminal electron acceptors of cytochrome cbb_{3} and ubiquinol oxidase and regulate cytochrome c_{y}, cytochrome c_{2} and the cytochrome bc_{1} complex expression. It also controls the activation of expression of the operons puf, puh, and puc to reduce the tension of oxygen in the cell.
