= Antimycin A =

Names
- Preferred IUPAC name (2R,3S,6S,7R,8R)-3-(3-Formamido-2-hydroxybenzamido)-8-hexyl-2,6-dimethyl-4,9-dioxo-1,5-dioxonan-7-yl 3-methylbutanoate
- Other names Fintrol

Identifiers
CAS Number	642-15-9 Antimycin A_{1}; 1397-94-0 (Antimycin A), 116095-18-2 (Antimycin A_{1b})
3D model (JSmol)	Interactive image
ChEBI	CHEBI:22584
ChEMBL	ChEMBL211501
ChemSpider	14246
ECHA InfoCard	100.162.279
MeSH	Antimycin+A
PubChem CID	14957
UNII	8771CCP8LT
CompTox Dashboard (EPA)	DTXSID3058668 DTXSID9032325, DTXSID3058668
- InChI: InChI=1S/C28H40N2O9/c1-6-7-8-9-11-20-25(39-22(32)14-16(2)3)18(5)38-28(36)23(17(4)37-27(20)35)30-26(34)19-12-10-13-21(24(19)33)29-15-31/h10,12-13,15-18,20,23,25,33H,6-9,11,14H2,1-5H3,(H,29,31)(H,30,34)/t17-,18+,20-,23+,25+/m1/s1 Key: UIFFUZWRFRDZJC-SBOOETFBSA-N; InChI=1/C28H40N2O9/c1-6-7-8-9-11-20-25(39-22(32)14-16(2)3)18(5)38-28(36)23(17(4)37-27(20)35)30-26(34)19-12-10-13-21(24(19)33)29-15-31/h10,12-13,15-18,20,23,25,33H,6-9,11,14H2,1-5H3,(H,29,31)(H,30,34)/t17-,18+,20-,23+,25+/m1/s1 Key: UIFFUZWRFRDZJC-SBOOETFBBB
- SMILES: O=CNc1cccc(c1O)C(=O)N[C@@H]2C(=O)O[C@H]([C@H](OC(=O)CC(C)C)[C@H](C(=O)O[C@@H]2C)CCCCCC)C

Properties
Chemical formula	C_{28}H_{40}N_{2}O_{9}
Molar mass	548.633 g·mol^{−1}

Hazards
- Occupational safety and health (OHS/OSH)
Main hazards	Acute toxic
- GHS labelling
Pictograms	(GHS06: Toxic)
Signal word	Danger
Hazard statements	H301, H311, H331
Precautionary statements	P261, P264, P270, P271, P280, P301+P310, P302+P352, P304+P340, P311, P312, P321, P322, P330, P361, P363, P403+P233, P405, P501
- Except where otherwise noted, data are given for materials in their standard state (at 25 °C [77 °F], 100 kPa). verify (what is ?) Infobox references

Antimycin A (more exactly antimycin A1b) is a secondary metabolite produced by Streptomyces bacteria and a member of a group of related compounds called antimycins. Antimycin A is classified as an extremely hazardous substance in the United States, as defined in Section 302 of the U.S. Emergency Planning and Community Right-to-Know Act (42 U.S.C. 11002), and is subject to strict reporting requirements by facilities which produce, store, or use it in significant quantities.

== Use ==
Antimycin A is the active ingredient in Fintrol, a chemical piscicide (fish poison) used in fisheries management.

Antimycin A was first discovered in 1945 and registered for use as a fish toxicant in 1960. Fintrol is the only currently registered product containing antimycin A and is classified as a restricted use pesticide because of its aquatic toxicity and requirement for highly specialized training in order to use it. In 1993, several toxicology studies were submitted to the United States Environmental Protection Agency yielding its toxicity.

Fintrol is used primarily by federal and state governments in order to eliminate invasive species in an area where resident species are threatened. Antimycin A is added drop-wise in order to reach a concentration of 25 parts per billion. These drip stations are typically used upstream in an area that is accessible to boats and traffic. In deeper bodies of water, a pump mechanism is used to disperse antimycin A through a perforated hose stretching the length of the water column.

In aquaculture, antimycin A is used as an agent to enhance catfish production via selective killing small and more sensitive species. When antimycin A is added at 25 ppb it provides a complete kill. However at 10 ppb, antimycin A is used as a selective killing agent to kill smaller or more sensitive species that may reduce the yield of commercial farming.

Products containing antimycin A can be registered providing they follow risk mitigation procedures.

Risk of Concern	Mitigation Measures
Exposure from consuming treated water	Flowing water must be treated with potassium permanganate; Drinking water within the treatment areas must be closed during treatment and until all monitoring of samples is below the limit of antimycin A detection, 0.015 parts per billion
Exposure from consuming treated fish	The certified applicator or designee under his/her direct supervision must prohibit consumption of dead fish taken from treatment areas.; The registrant must amend labels to specify maximum treatment concentrations of 10 ppb for use as a 'selective kill' in aquaculture.; When antimycin A is applied as a selective kill in aquaculture, the Certified Applicator must inform the owner/operator of the aquaculture site being treated that surviving fish must not be harvested for food or feed for a minimum of 12 months after treatment.; When antimycin A is applied as a complete kill in aquaculture, the Certified Applicator must inform the owner/operator of the aquaculture site being treated that the water body must not be restocked for a minimum of 7 days after treatment
Exposure from recreational activities in the treated water	The certified applicator or his/her designee must prohibit access to treated area for 7 days following treatment.
Occupational Exposure	The registrant must specify maximum treatment levels of 25 ppb; Anitmycin A must be applied by a certified applicator who attends a certification program for piscicide applications.; The applicator is required to wear long sleeved shirt and long pants, chemical resistant gloves, closed toed shoes and socks, and protective eyeware. Applicators using handheld equipment like a nozzle must wear a dust/mist respirator and coveralls. The applicator should not be wearing contact lenses.
Ecological Risk Quotients for non-target species	Antimycin A is forbidden to be used in marine or estuarine environments; The certified applicator or designee must ensure treatment does not pass beyond the designated treatment area; The certified applicator or designee should collect and bury any dead fish

To date there has been no usage in human medicine, although its possibility as a chemotherapeutic was explored.

== Mechanism of action ==
Antimycin A is an inhibitor of cellular respiration, specifically oxidative phosphorylation. Antimycin A binds to the Qi site of cytochrome c reductase, inhibiting the reduction of ubiquinone to ubiquinol in the Qi site, thereby disrupting the Q-cycle of enzyme turn over. It also will cause the disruption of the entire electron transport chain. Due to this, there can be no production of ATP. Cytochrome c reductase is a central enzyme in the electron transport chain of oxidative phosphorylation. The inhibition of this reaction disrupts the formation of the proton gradient across the inner membrane of the mitochondria. The production of ATP is subsequently inhibited, as protons are unable to flow through the ATP synthase complex in the absence of a proton gradient. This inhibition also results in the formation of the toxic free radical superoxide. In presence of antimycin A the dependence of the superoxide production rate on oxygen level is hyperbolic. In cultured cells at the background of mitochondrial respiration inhibition, the rate of superoxide production exceeds the cellular mechanisms to scavenge it, overwhelming the cell and leading to cell death.

It has also been found to inhibit the cyclic electron flow within photosynthetic systems along the proposed ferredoxin quinone reductase pathway.

Although cyanide acts to block the electron transport chain, antimycin A and cyanide act in different mechanisms. Cyanide binds a site in neighboring protein where iron normally binds, preventing oxygen from binding at all. This prevents cellular respiration completely leading to cell death. Because antimycin A binds to a specific protein in the electron transport chain, its toxicity can be highly species dependent because of subtle species specific differences in ubiquinol. This is why Fintrol can be used a selective killing agent in commercial farming.

Fungus-growing attine ants have been shown to use antimycins - produced by symbiotic Streptomyces bacteria - in their fungiculture, to inhibit non-cultivar (i.e. pathogenic) fungi. One research group studying these symbiotic Streptomyces bacteria recently identified the biosynthetic gene cluster for antimycins, which was unknown despite the compounds themselves being identified 60 years ago. Antimycins are synthesised by a hybrid polyketide synthase (PKS)/non-ribosomal peptide synthase (NRPS).

== Toxicity ==
=== Lethal Doses ===
Lethal doses in fish and amphibian species

Species	LC50/24 hours exposure	LC50/96 hours exposure
Trout	0.07 ppb	0.04 ppb
Black Bullhead Catfish	200 ppb	45 ppb
Channel Catfish	>10 ppb	9 ppb
Goldfish	1 ppb	
Snails	800 ppb	
Tiger salamander	>1080 ppb	
Tadpoles	45 ppb	10 ppb
Leopard Frog	45 ppb	10 ppb

Lethal Doses in Mammals

Animal	LD50 mg/kg ingested
Rat	28
Mouse	25
Lamb	1-5
Dog	>5
Rabbit	10

=== Human Exposure and First Aid ===
Exposure to Treated Water: The effects of chronic, sub-lethal human exposure have estimated and extrapolated from murine (=pertaining to rodents) toxicology studies. Estimates in the literature have been determined using EPA risk assessment protocols. Studies aimed at determining these levels found a concentration in mice where there is "No Observed Adverse Effect Level." From there, the EPA describes methods to determine a reference dose (RfD), the upper limit of the substance that can be consumed daily for the rest of one's life without any observable consequences. The RfD was determined to be 1.7 micrograms/kg/day. For a grown adult, weighing around 70 kg, they can safely consume 2 liters of treated water at 60ppb.

Toxic effects may result from accidental ingestion of the material. Animal toxicology studies suggest that exposure to less than 40 grams of antimycin A can result in serious adverse health effects to the individual.

Route of Exposure	Effect
Eye	Direct contact to the eye may result in discomfort with tearing and redness. There may be slight abrasion, and antimycin has the potential to produce a foreign body sensation in some individuals.
Skin	Open cuts should not be exposed to the material.; It is crucial that good hygiene practices are followed to prevent abrasion from prolonged exposure
Inhaled	Prolonged inhalation can result in airway irritation and potentially respiratory distress.

Treatment is focused on relieving symptoms and monitoring for respiratory distress, pulmonary edema, seizures, and shock. Emesis after ingestion is not recommended for the potential of central nervous system depression. Activated charcoal can be given as 240mL of water with 30g of charcoal. The patient should be monitored for development of systemic symptoms and signs. After inhalation the patient should be moved to fresh air and monitored for bronchospasm, difficulty breathing, and respiratory distress. If needed, provide the patient with oxygen and secure an airway via tracheal intubation. Treat bronchospasm with inhaled beta2-adrenergic agonist and severe bronchospasm can be treated with systemic corticosteroids.
