= VPS9D1 =

Protein-coding gene in the species Homo sapiens

Identifiers
- Aliases: VPS9D1, ATP-BL, C16orf7, VPS9 domain containing 1, ATPBL
- External IDs: MGI: 1914143; GeneCards: VPS9D1

Gene location (Human)
Chr.	Chromosome 16 (human)
Band	16q24.3	Start	89,707,134 bp
Band	16q24.3	End	89,720,898 bp

Gene location (Mouse)
Chr.	Chromosome 8 (mouse)
Band	8|8 E1	Start	123,242,356 bp
Band	8|8 E1	End	123,254,348 bp
RNA expression pattern
Bgee	Human / Mouse (ortholog); Top expressed in: right frontal lobe; right hemisphere of cerebellum; anterior pituitary; granulocyte; apex of heart; anterior cingulate cortex; Brodmann area 9; left adrenal cortex; right lobe of liver; right adrenal gland / Top expressed in: saccule; granulocyte; otic vesicle; interventricular septum; visual cortex; primary visual cortex; superior frontal gyrus; otic placode; zygote; primary oocyte; More reference expression data
BioGPS	n/a
Orthologs
Databases	NCBI: entry; OMA: entry
Species	Human	Mouse
Entrez	9605	72325
Ensembl	ENSG00000075399	ENSMUSG00000001062
UniProt	Q9Y2B5	Q8C190
RefSeq (mRNA)	NM_004913	NM_028200; NM_001310661
RefSeq (protein)	NP_004904	NP_001297590; NP_082476
Location (UCSC)	Chr 16: 89.71 – 89.72 Mb	Chr 8: 123.24 – 123.25 Mb
PubMed search
- Wikidata
View/Edit Human	View/Edit Mouse

VPS9 domain-containing protein 1 is a protein that in humans is encoded by the gene VPS9D1 (previously C16orf7). Not much has been reported about the precise function of this protein, but it is predicted to be involved in oxidative phosphorylation.
