= Chlororespiration =

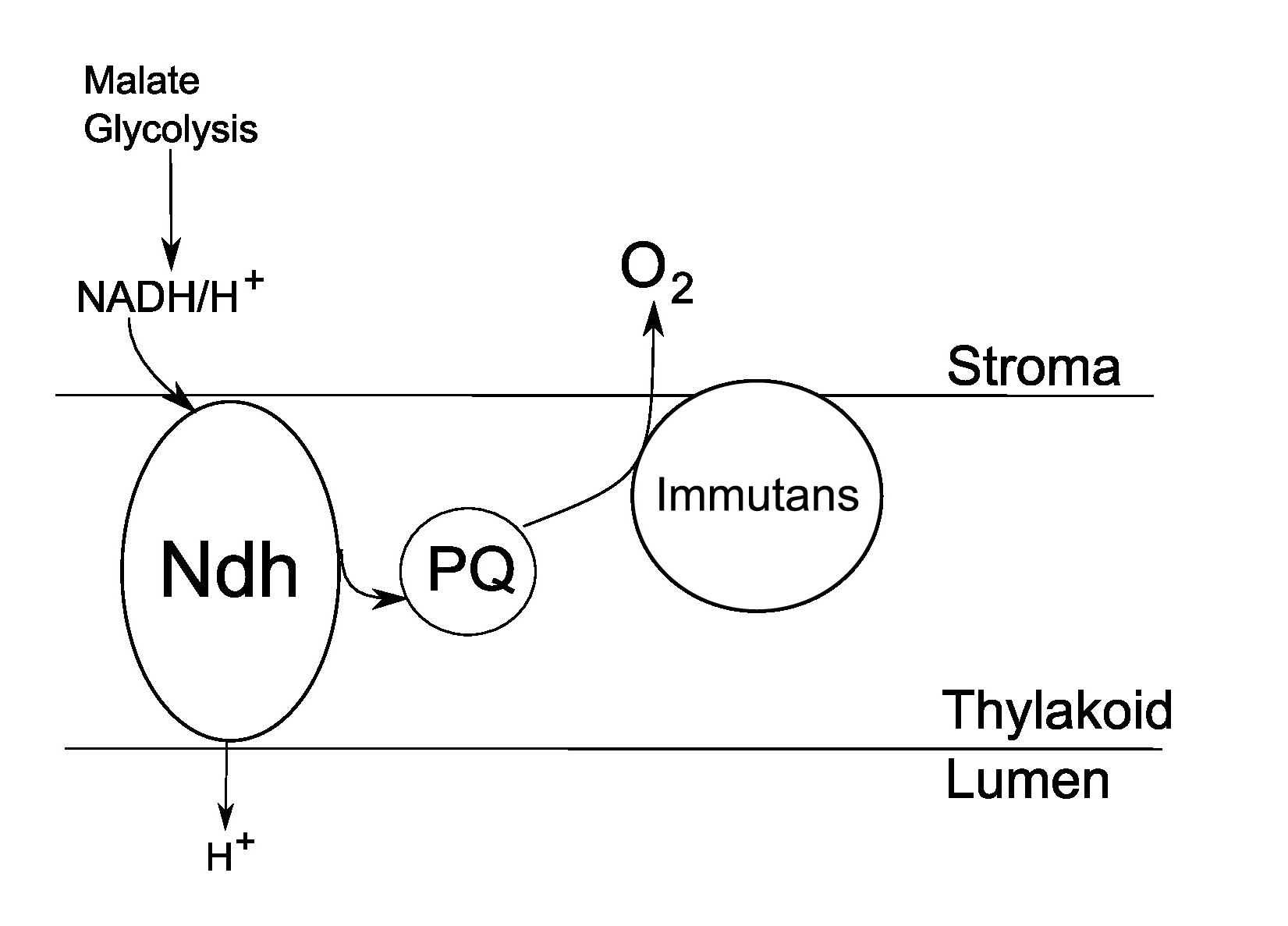
Chlororespiration basics

Chlororespiration is a respiratory process that is thought to occur in plant chloroplasts, involving the electron transport chain (ETC) in the thylakoid membrane. It is thought to involve NAD(P)H dehydrogenase (NDH) and plastid terminal oxidase (PTOX/IMMUTANS), forming an ETC utilizing molecular oxygen as the electron acceptor. This process also interacts with the ETC in the mitochondrion where respiration takes place, as well as with photosynthesis. If photosynthesis is inhibited by environmental stressors like water deficiency, increased heat, and/or increased/decreased light exposure, or even chilling stress, then chlororespiration is one of the crucial ways that plants use to compensate for chemical energy synthesis.

== Chlororespiration – the latest model ==
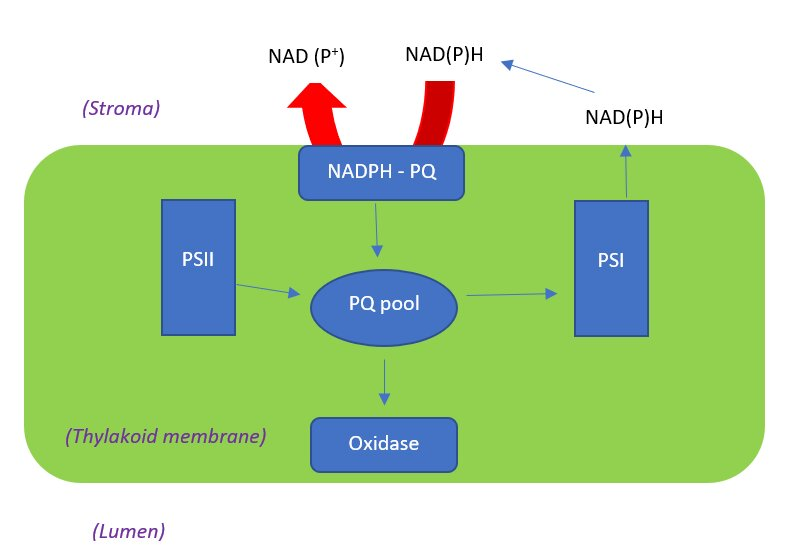
A diagram depicting an early understanding of the process of chlororespiration

Initially, the presence of chlororespiration as a legitimate respiratory process in plants was heavily doubted. However, experimentation on Chlamydomonas reinhardtii discovered plastoquinone (PQ) to be a redox carrier. The role of this redox carrier is to transport electrons from the NAD(P)H enzyme to an oxidase enzyme on the thylakoid membrane. Using this cyclic electron chain around photosystem I (PSI), chlororespiration compensates for the lack of light. This cyclic pathway also allows electrons to re-enter the PQ pool through NDH, which is then used to supply ATP to plant cells.

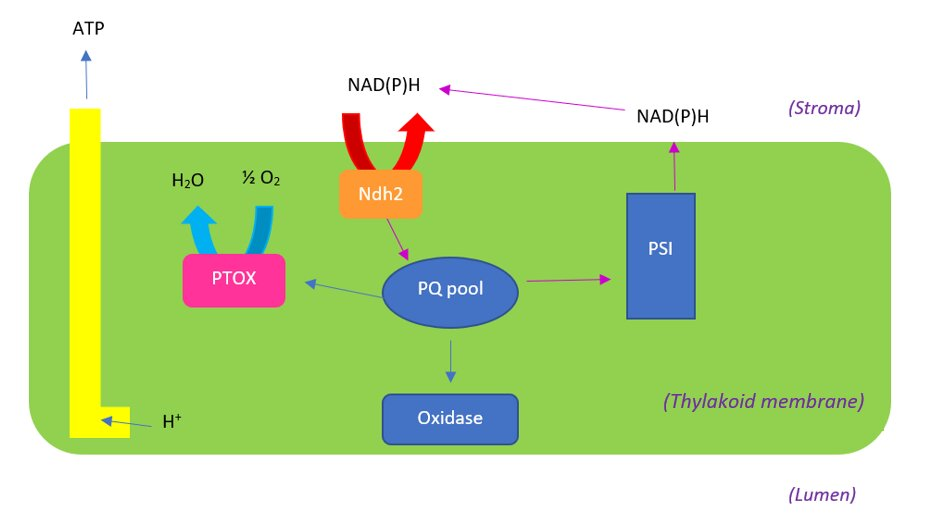
A diagram depicting newly discovered enzymes (PTOX and the NDH complex) as part of the chlororespiratory process in higher plants like Meillandina roses.

In the year 2002, the discovery of the molecules: plastid terminal oxidase (PTOX) and NDH complexes, have revolutionised the concept of chlororespiration. Using evidence from experimentation on a Meillandina rose, this latest model observes the role of PTOX to be an enzyme that prevents the PQ pool from over-reducing, by stimulating its reoxidation. Whereas, the NDH complexes are responsible for providing a gateway for electrons to form an ETC. The presence of such molecules are apparent in the non-appressed thylakoid membranes of higher plants like Meillandina roses.

== The relation between chlororespiration, photosynthesis and respiration ==
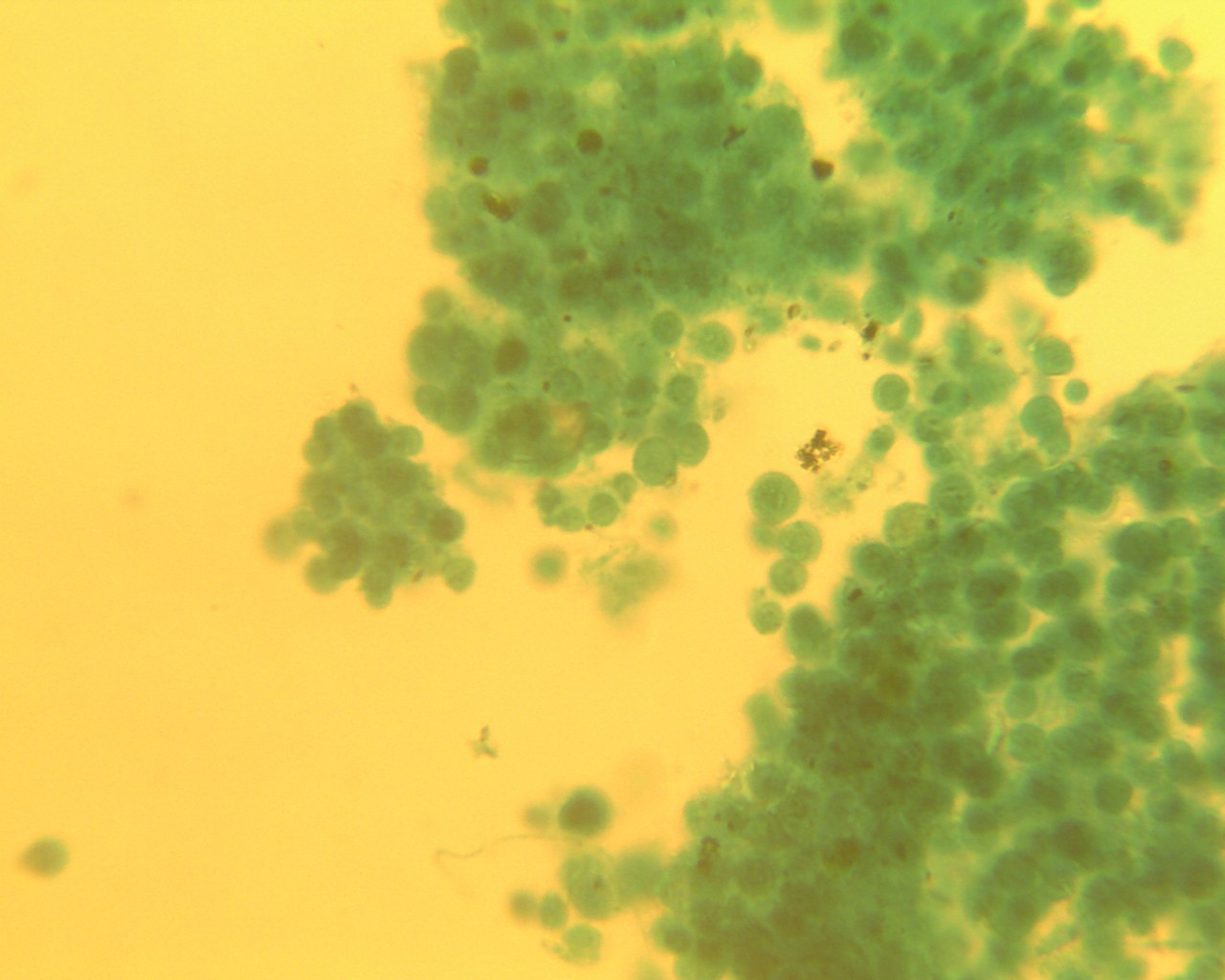
Chlamydomonas reinhardtii – a species in which chlororespiration, photosynthesis and respiration occur

Experimentation with respiratory oxidase inhibitors (for instance, cyanide) on unicellular algae has revealed interactive pathways to be present between chloroplasts and mitochondria. Metabolic pathways responsible for photosynthesis are present in chloroplasts, whereas respiratory metabolic pathways are present in mitochondria. In these pathways, metabolic carriers (like phosphate) exchange NAD(P)H molecules between photosynthetic and respiratory ETCs. Evidence using mass spectrometry on algae and photosynthetic mutants of Chlamydomonas discovered that oxygen molecules were also being exchanged between photosynthetic and chlororespiratory ETCs. The mutant Chlamydomonas alga species lacks photosystems I and II (PSI and PSII), so when the alga underwent flash-induced PSI activity, it resulted in no effect on mitochondrial pathways of respiration. Instead, this flash-induced PSI activity caused an exchange between photosynthetic and chlororespiratory ETCs, which was observed using polarography. This flash of PSI activity is triggered by an over-reduction of the PQ pool and/or lack of the pyridine nucleotide in the thylakoid membrane. A reduction in such molecules then stimulates NAD(P)H dehydrogenase and PTOX to trigger chlororespiratory pathways.

Furthermore, in the absence of light (and thus photosynthesis), chlororespiration plays an integral role in enabling metabolic pathways to compensate for chemical energy synthesis. This is achieved through the oxidation of stromal compounds, which increases the PQ pool and allows for the chlororespiratory ETC to take place.

== Stimulation of chlororespiration ==
=== Heat and light as stimulants ===
==== Quiles' experiment ====
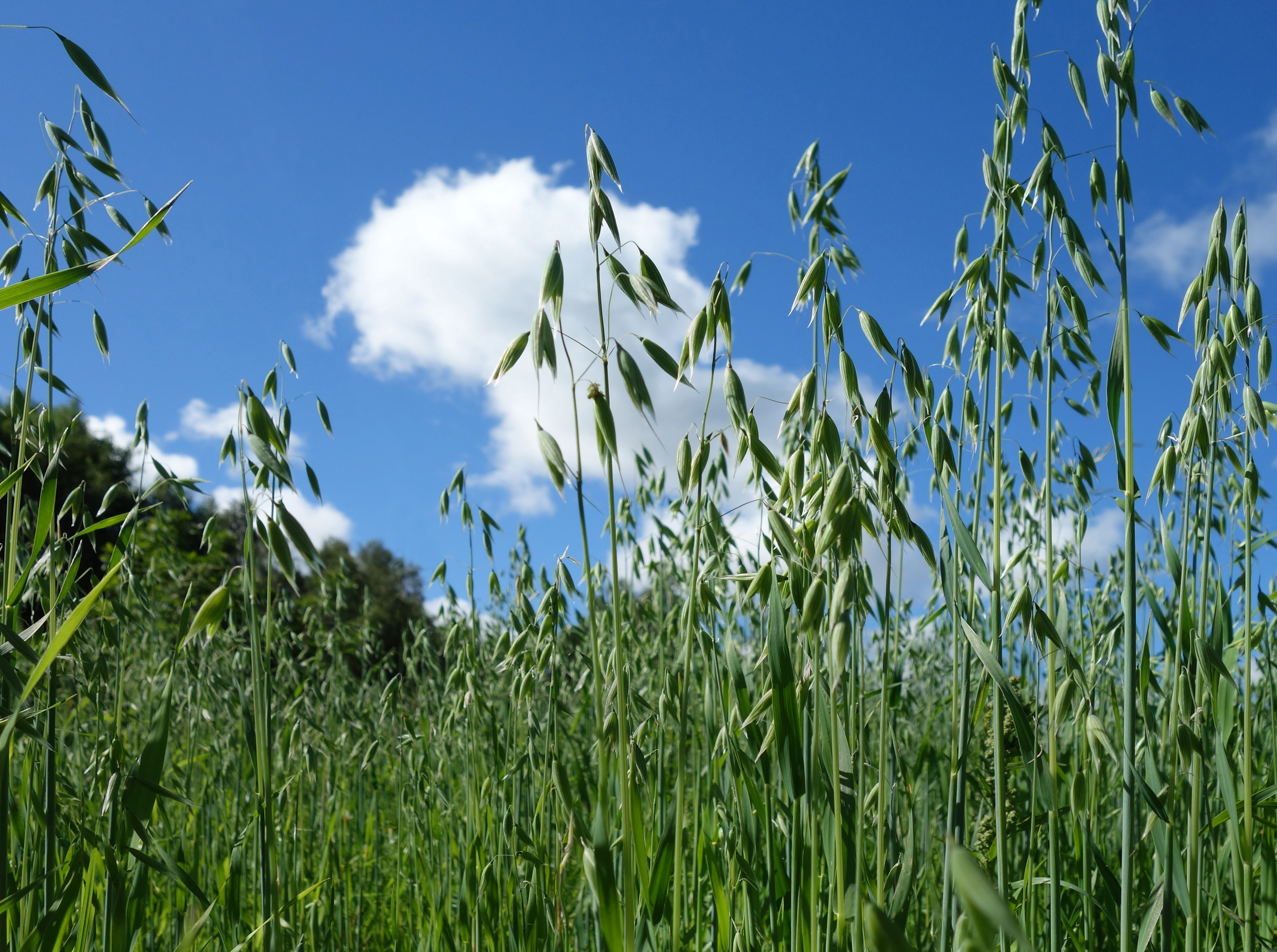
Oat plants

An experiment on oat plants by scientist Maria Quiles, revealed that extreme light intensity can inhibit photosynthesis and result in the lack of PSII activity. This reduction leads to an increase in NDH and PTOX levels which then causes the stimulation of chlororespiration.

Oat leaves were incubated and chlorophyll fluorescence emission was used to examine the effect of extreme light intensity. As the emission of the fluorescence increased, the PQ pool decreased. This stimulated the cyclic electron flow, causing NDH and PTOX levels to ultimately incline and initiate the process of chlororespiration within the thylakoid membrane.

The effect of adding n-propyl gallate to the incubated leaves was also observed. N-propyl gallate is a molecule that helps distinguish between PQ reduction and oxidation activities by inhibiting PTOX. Quiles noted an increase in chlorophyll fluorescence inside the thylakoid membrane after the addition of n-propyl gallate. The result led to the stimulation of the NDH enzyme and its cyclic pathway, causing a continuous increase in chlorophyll fluorescence levelslevels.

==== Quiles' conclusion ====
After comparing the metabolic responses between oat plants under an average light intensity to that of oat plants under extreme light intensity, Quiles noted that the amount of PSII produced was of a lower amount in the leaves that underwent chlororespiration in extreme light. Whereas higher levels of PSII were yielded by those leaves that underwent average light intensity. A higher number of PSII is more efficient for chemical energy synthesis and thus for a plant's survival. Quiles indicates that, although the chlororespiratory pathway is less efficient, it still serves as a back-up response for energy production in plants. Ultimately, Quiles concluded that the intense light on oat plants had caused PSII levels to reduce and thus, initiate an influx of gateway (NDH) proteins to start the process of chlororespiration.

=== Drought as a stimulant ===
==== Paredes' and Quiles' experiment ====
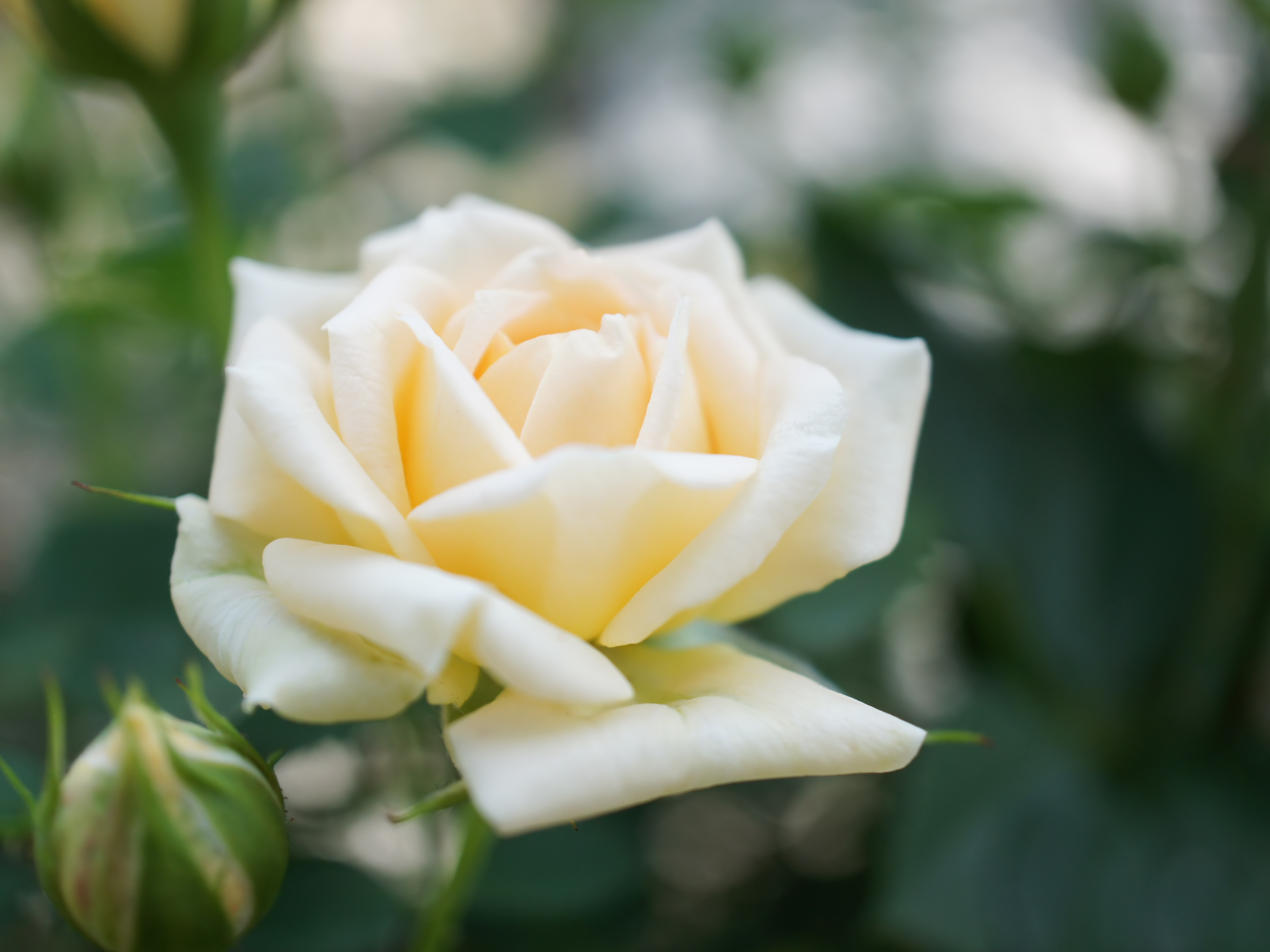
a Meillandina rose

Scientists Miriam Paredes and Maria Quiles led an investigation on Meillandina roses, and their metabolic response to water deficiency. They noted how limited water irrigation can cause a reduction in PSII levels, which then results in the inhibition of photosynthesis. Paredes and Quiles also noticed the increase in chlororespiration activity as a protective mechanism for the lack of photosynthesis.

In the experiment, the plants in drought were analysed with fluorescence imaging technique. This form of analysis detected increased levels of PTOX, and NDH activity within the plant. An increase in these two enzymes led to the initiation of chlororespiration.

N-propyl gallate was also added to these water deficient plants. The effect resulted in increased chlorophyll fluorescence levels. Quiles recorded a similar outcome in the same species of plants that went under intense light. This increase in chlorophyll fluorescence is attributed to the influx of NDH in the thylakoid membrane, which then led to an increase in the by-product, hydrogen peroxide, inside the thylakoid membrane.

==== Paredes' and Quiles' conclusion ====
Paredes and Quiles concluded that chloroplasts under stress from drought rely on processes like the opening of stomata to disperse excess heat accumulated via metabolic processes within plant cells. These metabolic processes are responsible for chemical energy synthesis that can be achieved via chlororespiratory when decreased photosynthesis activity is evident.

=== Darkness as a stimulant ===
==== Gasulla's, Casano's and Guéra's experiment ====
Scientists Francisco Gasulla, Leonardo Casano and Alfredo Guéra, observed lichen's metabolic response when placed in dark conditions. The light harvesting complex (LHC) inside the chloroplasts of Lichen is activated when subjected to darkness. Gasulla, Casano and Guéra, noticed that this increase in LHC activity caused PSII and the PQ pool within lichen to decrease, indicating the initiation of chlororespiration.

Immunodetection analysis was used to determine the amount of LHC molecules inside lichen in a dark environment, and a luminous environment. By determining the amount of LHC within the chloroplast, scientists were able to notice decreased PSII activity. This reduction was caused by a loss in excitation energy in the PSII ETC, which then stimulated an incline in chlororespiratory pathways. Gasulla, Casano and Guéra, gathered this result, when both light-adapted and dark-adapted lichen were placed in darkness. They found that the level of LHC molecules in dark-adapted lichen had doubled compared to light adapted lichen. It was also noted that the chlororespiratory ETCs were triggered at a much earlier time in dark-adapted lichen compared to light-adapted lichen. This resulted in a faster metabolic rate and chemical synthesis response in dark-adapted lichen due to chlororespiration.

==== Gasulla's, Casano's and Guéra's conclusion ====
Gasulla, Casano and Guéra concluded that the longer the lichen are subjected to darkness, the quicker the chlororespiratory pathways can begin. This is due to the fast depletion of PTOX which reduce the PQ pool. These events then stimulate chlororespiratory ETCs into an ongoing loop until the lichen are placed in a luminous environment.

They also derived LHC to be another indicator for chlororespiration. When PSII activity decreased, LHC concentrations inside the chloroplast increased due to loss in ETC activity. This then stimulated chlororespiratory activity to compensate for chemical energy synthesis.

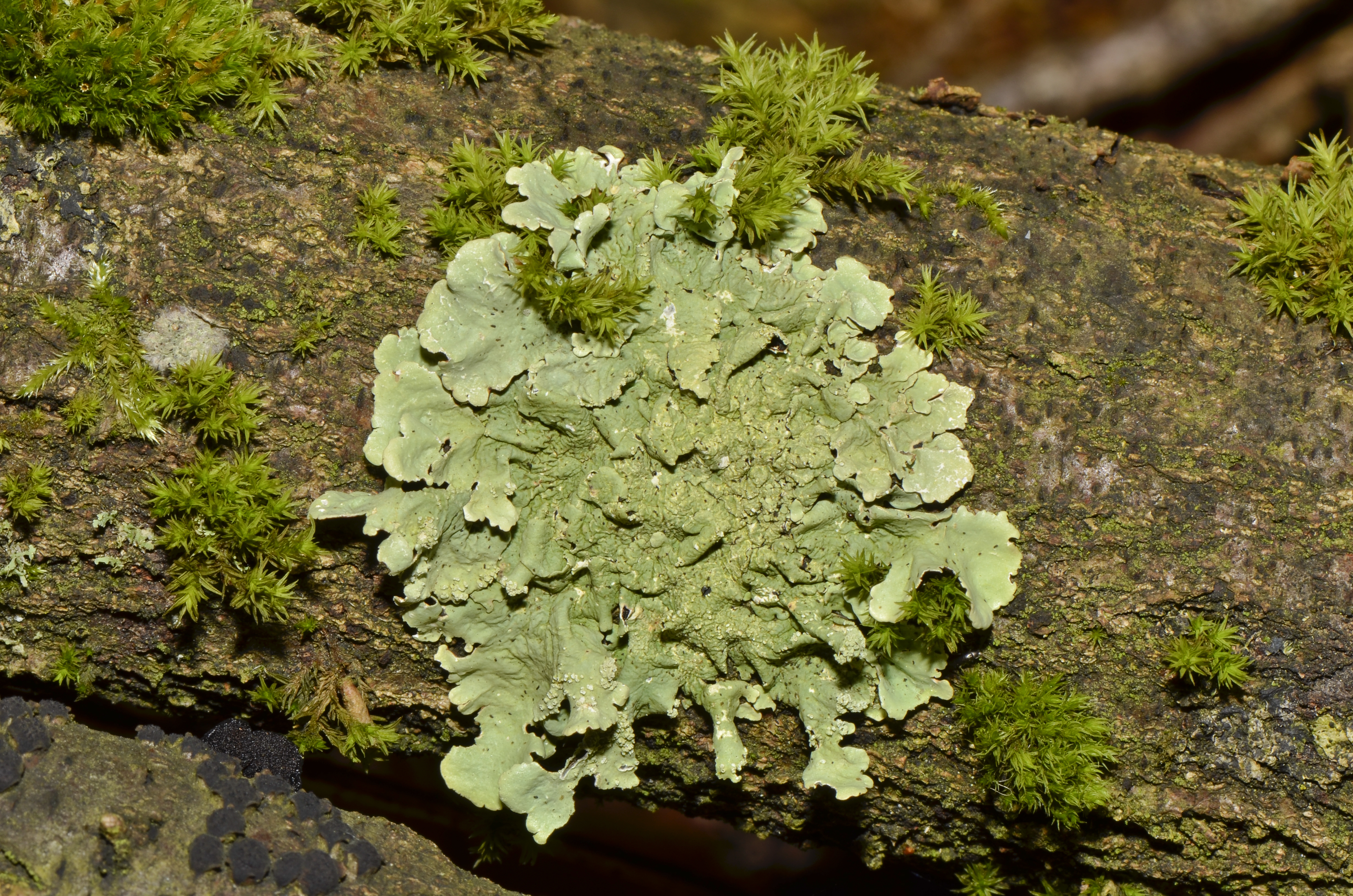
Lichen

=== Chilling stress as a stimulant ===
==== Segura's and Quiles' experiment ====
An experiment observing chilling stress on the tropical plant species, Spathiphyllum wallisii by scientists Maria Segura and Maria Quiles, showcased varying responses by chlororespiratory pathways when different parts of the plant were chilled at 10 degrees Celsius.

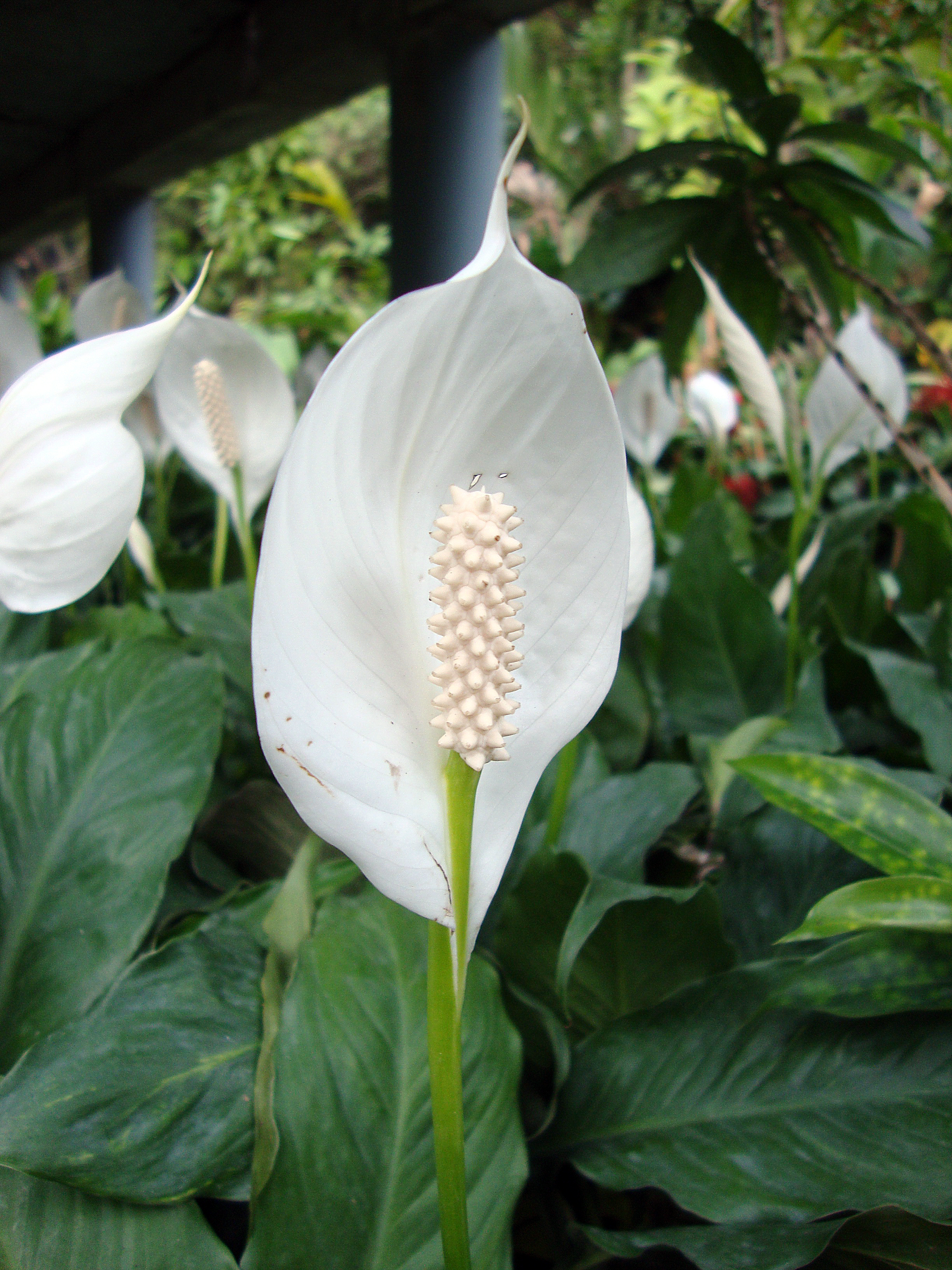
Spathiphyllum wallisii

Segura and Quiles noticed that when the roots of the plant were subjected to low temperatures (10 °C), the level of chlororespiratory molecules (NDH and PTOX) slightly varied when compared to the level of NDH and PTOX within the controlled plant. However, when the stem alone was cooled at 10 °C, the molecules NDH and PTOX increased in amount as a result of reduced PSI activity. Segura and Quiles then compared this result by subjecting only the leaves of the plant to 10 °C. They noticed that this had caused the PSII activity to stop, and thus inhibited the process of photosynthesis. The lack in photosynthetic activity, in combination with the incline in NDH and PTOX, triggered chlororespiratory pathways to begin chemical energy synthesis.

Furthermore, Segura and Quiles also noted that the simultaneous chilling of the leaves and heating of the roots (whilst the plant is under illumination), can cause the slowing and eventual inhibition of PSII. This then led to an over-reduction in the PQ pool, which ultimately stimulated chlororespiration.

Segura and Quiles utilised the imaging technique to determine the level of photosynthetic activity in the leaves of the plants. By discerning the percentage of photosynthesis efficiency, Segura and Quiles were able to determine the likelihood of triggering chlororespiratory pathways. They noticed that the percentage of photosynthesis efficiency remained high in test subjects where:

- only the leaves were chilled
- only the stem was chilled
- only the roots were chilled

This high percentage of photosynthesis efficiency meant that the chances of chlororespiration taking place are slim. However, this was not true for the plant that underwent both stem chilling at 10 °C and root heating at 24 °C. The photosynthesis efficiency of this test subject was significantly lower when compared to the experimental control. This also indicated the inhibition of PSII activity which then caused chlororespiration to begin.

Segura and Quiles also used an immunoblot analysis to deduce the effect of varying temperatures on different parts of the plant. Specifically, the immunoblot measures the amount of PTOX and NDH complex accumulated within the thylakoid membrane of the chloroplast organelle. An increase in NDH complex was evident in the plant where the stem was chilled at 10 degrees Celsius and the root heated at 24 degrees Celsius. Chlororespiration was stimulated in this plant. Dissimilarly, the immunoblot analysis detected no variation in the NDH and PTOX levels in test subjects where:

- only the leaves were chilled
- only the stem was chilled
- only the roots were chilled

These test subjects had similar concentrations of NDH and PTOX when compared to the concentration of NDH and PTOX within the experimental control.

==== Segura's and Quiles' conclusion ====
Segura and Quiles concluded that chilling stress only induces chlororespiration when the stem is significantly cool and the roots are simultaneously warmer, compared to the average Spathiphyllum wallisii in controlled conditions. Segura and Quiles notice that PSII is present in chloroplast, (which is lacking in roots), thus by chilling the stem (which contains chloroplast), PSII ETCs can then be inhibited to trigger a reduction in PQ pool and as a result, chlororespiration.

== Importance of chlororespiration ==
Although chlororespiration is not as efficient as photosynthesis in producing energy, its significance is attributed to its role as a survival adaptation for plants when placed in conditions lacking light and water or if placed in uncomfortable temperatures (note: optimum temperatures vary across different plant species). Additionally, Cournac and Peltier noticed that chlororespiratory ETCs play a role in balancing electron flow across respiratory and photosynthetic ETCs. This helps maintain water balance and regulate the plant's internal temperature.
