= Antimycin =

Group of chemical compounds

Antimycins are produced as secondary metabolites by Streptomyces bacteria, a soil bacteria. These specialized metabolites likely function to kill neighboring organisms in order to provide the streptomyces bacteria with a competitive edge.

== Biosynthesis ==
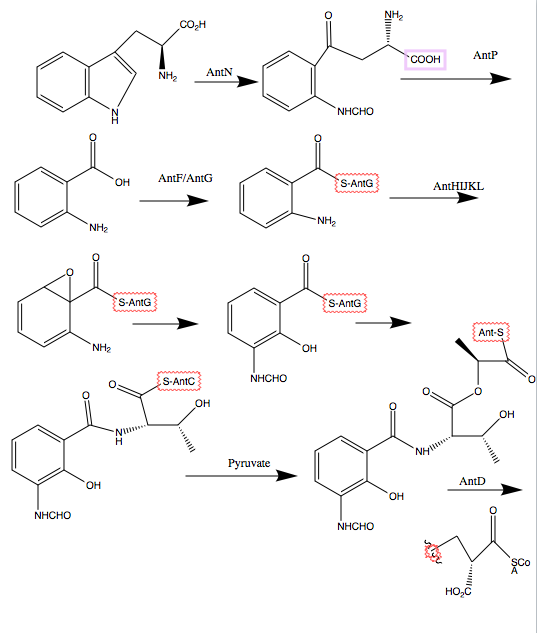
Part 1

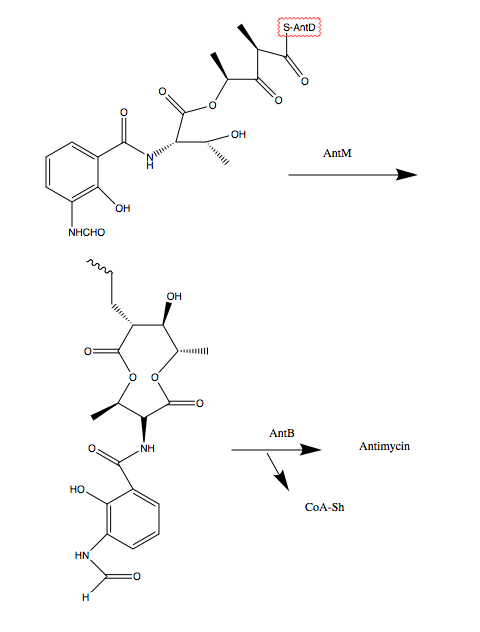
Part 2

Antimycins are produced by a non-ribosomal peptide synthetase (NRPS)/polyketide synthase (PKS) assembly complex which acts as an assembly line for antimycin production. The assembly is genetically coded for by the ant gene family. The assembly requires 14 proteins, AntBCDEFGHIJKLMNO, which shuttle the intermediates along the assembly line through a series of transesterifications, keto reductions, thiolations (addition of a sulfur containing group), condensations, and adenylations. The last two steps involving AntB and AntO are tailoring steps. The following steps describe chemically what the Ant Enzymes do in order to synthesize Antimycin. Synthesis begins with tryptophan, an amino acid.

1. The indole ring of tryptophan, an amino acid, is opened by a pathway-specific tryptophan-2.3-dioxygnease, AntN, to make N-formyl-L-kynurenine.

2. N-formyl-L-kynurenine is converted to anthranilate by the pathway-specific kynureninase, AntP.

3. Anthranilate is activated by the acyl-CoA ligase protein, AntF and loaded onto its cognate carrier protein, AntG, for further processing.

4. Anthranilate is converted to 3-aminosalicylate by a multicomponent oxygenase, AntHIJKL.

5. 3-Aminosalicylate is presented to the NRPS, AntC. AntC has two modules which are organized Condensation1 (C1) -Adenylation1 (A1) -Thiolation1 (T1) -Condensation2 (C2) -Adenylation2 (A2) -Ketoreduction (KR) -Thiolation2 (T2). The A1 domain activates and loads threonine, an amino acid, onto T1, followed by a C1 promoted condensation of 3-aminosalicylate and threonine. The A2 domain activates and loads pyruvate onto T2. Pyruvate is reduced by the KR domain and condensed with threonine by C2

6. The Ketosynthase domain of PKS catalyses the decarboxylative condensation between the aminoacyl thioester attached to AntC T2 domain and the 2-carboxy-acyl moiety attached to AntD Acetyl Carrier Protein domain.

7. AntM catalyses the reduction of the β-keto group, which precedes the AntD TE domain – promoted release of the nine-membered dilactone

8. A lipase homologue, AntO, and acyltransferase homologue, AntB, catalyze the installation of the N-formyl group and the transesterification of the C-8 hydroxyl group, respectively, resulting in the backbone for the Antimycin family.

== See also ==
- Antimycin A
- Urauchimycin
