= Urauchimycin =

Group of chemical compounds

Antimycin congeners

Urauchimycins are antimycin antibiotics isolated from marine actinomycete.
