= Cytochrome c reductase =

Cytochrome c reductase may refer to:

- Coenzyme Q – cytochrome c reductase, an enzyme
- Iron—cytochrome-c reductase
- NADH dehydrogenase, an enzyme
