= Alternative oxidase =

Identifiers
- Symbol: AOX
- Pfam: PF01786
- InterPro: IPR002680
- OPM superfamily: 357
- OPM protein: 3w54
Available protein structures:
- PDB: IPR002680 PF01786 (ECOD; PDBsum)
- AlphaFold: IPR002680; PF01786
- Also matches plastid terminal oxidase and bacterial AOX.

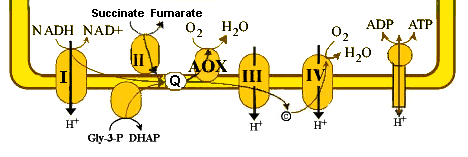
The alternative oxidase shown as part of the complete electron transport chain. UQ is ubiquinol/ubiquinone, C is cytochrome c and AOX is the alternative oxidase.

The alternative oxidase (AOX) is an enzyme that forms part of the electron transport chain in mitochondria of certain organisms. Proteins homologous to the mitochondrial oxidase and the related plastid terminal oxidase have also been identified in bacterial genomes.

The oxidase provides an alternative route for electrons passing through the electron transport chain to reduce oxygen. However, as several proton-pumping steps are bypassed in this alternative pathway, activation of the oxidase reduces ATP generation. This enzyme was first identified as a distinct oxidase pathway from cytochrome c oxidase as the alternative oxidase is resistant to inhibition by the poison cyanide.

== Function ==
The fungicide azoxystrobin.

This metabolic pathway leading to the alternative oxidase diverges from the cytochrome-linked electron transport chain at the ubiquinone pool. Alternative pathway respiration only produces proton translocation at Complex 1 (NADH dehydrogenase) and so has a lower ATP yield than the full pathway. The expression of the alternative oxidase gene AOX is influenced by stresses such as cold, reactive oxygen species and infection by pathogens, as well as other factors that reduce electron flow through the cytochrome pathway of respiration. Although the benefit conferred by this activity remains uncertain, it may enhance an organism's ability to resist these stresses by maintaining the oxidized state of the upstream electron-transport components, thereby reducing the level of oxidative stress induced by overreduced electron carriers.

Unusually, the bloodstream form of the protozoan parasite Trypanosoma brucei, which is the cause of sleeping sickness, depends entirely on the alternative oxidase pathway for cellular respiration through its electron transport chain. This major metabolic difference between the parasite and its human host has made the T. brucei alternative oxidase an attractive target for drug design. Of the known inhibitors of alternative oxidases, the antibiotic ascofuranone inhibits the T. brucei enzyme and cures infection in mice.

In fungi, the ability of the alternative oxidase to bypass inhibition of parts of the electron transport chain can contribute to fungicide resistance. This is seen in the strobilurin fungicides that target complex III, such as azoxystrobin, picoxystrobin and fluoxastrobin. However, because the alternative pathway generates less ATP, these fungicides are still effective in preventing spore germination, as this is an energy-intensive process.

== Structure and mechanism ==
The alternative oxidase is an integral monotopic membrane protein that is tightly bound to the inner mitochondrial membrane from matrix side The enzyme has been predicted to contain a coupled diiron center on the basis of a conserved sequence motif consisting of the proposed iron ligands, four glutamate and two histidine amino acid residues. The electron spin resonance study of Arabidopsis thaliana alternative oxidase AOX1a showed that the enzyme contains a hydroxo-bridged mixed-valent Fe(II)/Fe(III) binuclear iron center. A catalytic cycle has been proposed that involves this di-iron center and at least one transient protein-derived free radical, which is probably formed on a tyrosine residue.

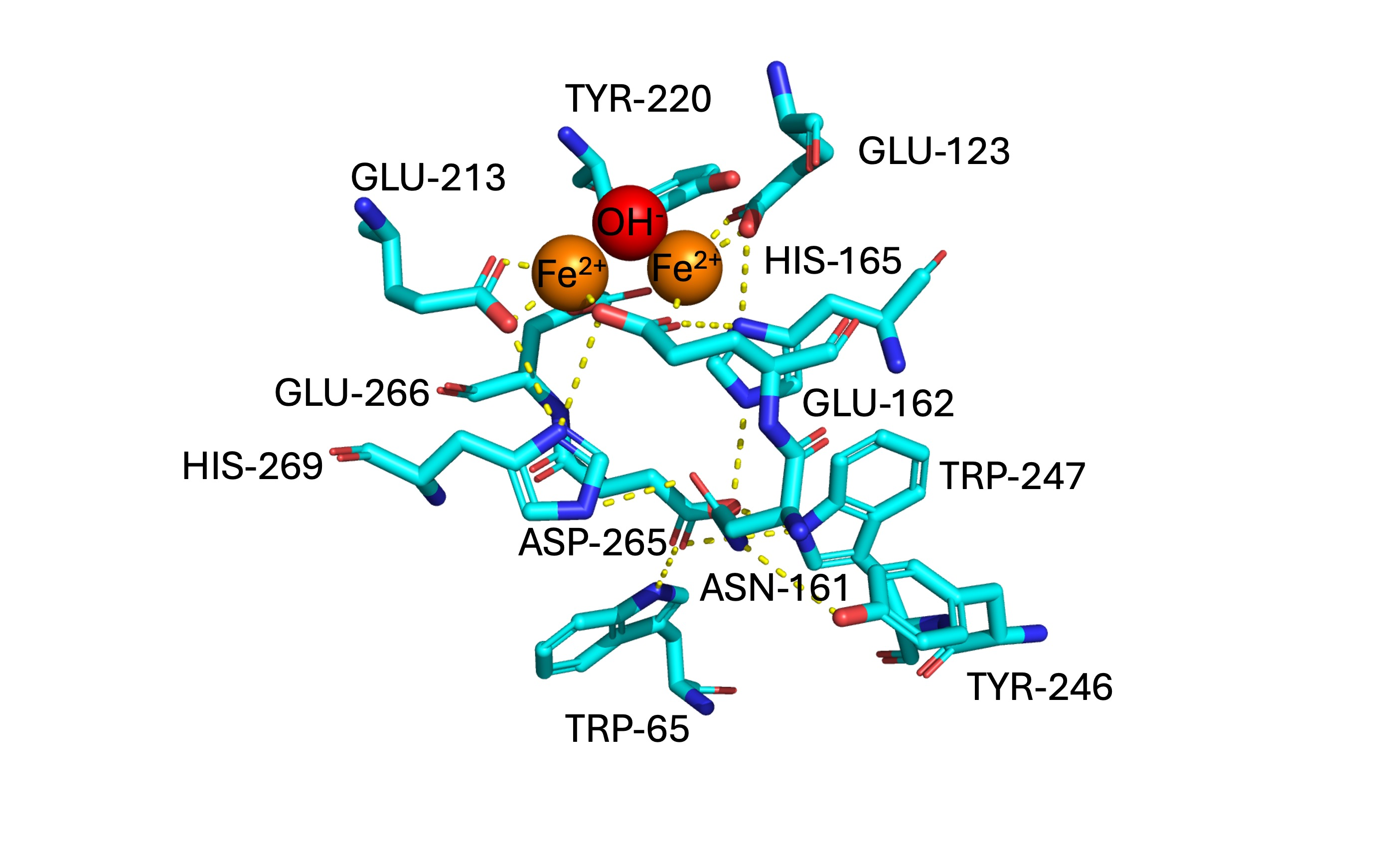
Active Site of Alternative Oxidase. PBD: 3W54.

The active site of alternative oxidase was identified through x-ray crystalography using trypanosomal alternative oxidase. The active site is hydrophobic and within the deep interior of the protein. Tyr220 is within 4 Å of the active site and is critical for catalytic activity. His165, His269, Glu123, Glu162, Glu213, Glu266, Trp65, Trp247, Asp265, Asn161, and Tyr246 are essential active site residues. The active site residues interact with two Fe^{2+} molecules and one OH^{−} molecule. A network of hydrogen bonds stabilizes the active site.

== See also ==
- Plastid terminal oxidase
- Ubiquinol oxidase
- Metalloprotein
- Bioinorganic chemistry
- Cofactor
