= Oxidative phosphorylation =

Metabolic pathway

Oxidative phosphorylation is made up of two closely connected components: the electron transport chain and chemiosmosis. The electron transport chain in the cell is the site of oxidative phosphorylation. The NADH and succinate generated in the citric acid cycle are oxidized, releasing the energy of O_{2} to power the ATP synthase.

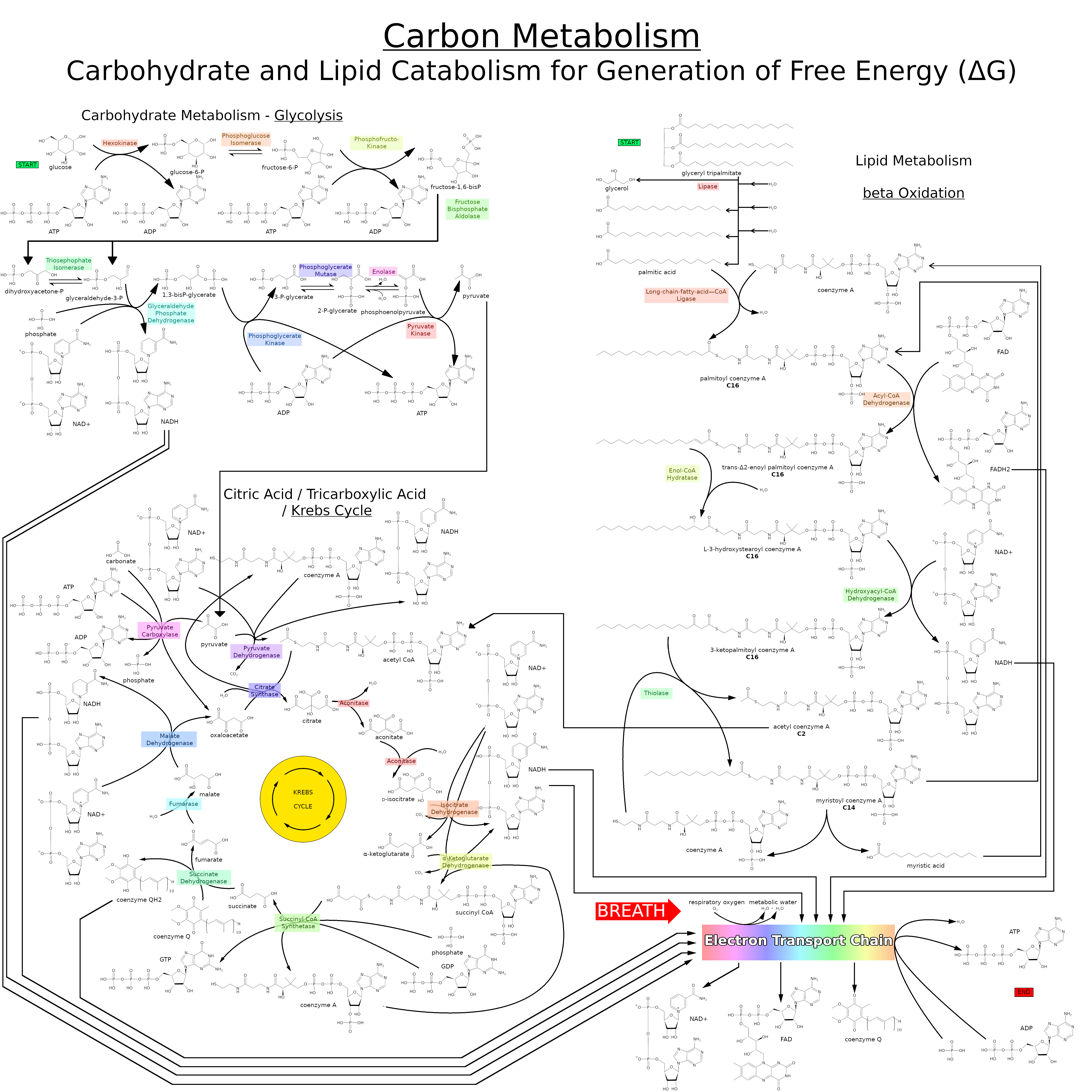
Carbon Catabolism pathway map for free energy including carbohydrate and lipid sources of energy, showing the upstream processes that feed precursors into the electron transport chain, shown here in a rainbow spectrum of colors in the bottom right of the diagram.

Oxidative phosphorylation (Note: (UK /ɒkˈsɪd.ə.tɪv/, US /ˈɑːk.sɪˌdeɪ.tɪv/: "Oxidative". Cambridge Dictionary. Archived from the original on 24 January 2018.) or electron transport-linked phosphorylation or terminal oxidation, is the metabolic pathway in which cells use enzymes to oxidize nutrients, thereby releasing chemical energy in order to produce adenosine triphosphate (ATP). In eukaryotes, this takes place inside mitochondria. Almost all aerobic organisms carry out oxidative phosphorylation. This pathway is so pervasive because it releases more energy than fermentation.

In aerobic respiration, the energy stored in the chemical bonds of glucose is released by the cell in glycolysis and subsequently the citric acid cycle, producing carbon dioxide and the energetic electron donors NADH and FADH₂. Oxidative phosphorylation uses these molecules and O_{2} to produce ATP, which is used throughout the cell whenever energy is needed. During oxidative phosphorylation, electrons are transferred from the electron donors to a series of electron acceptors in a series of redox reactions ending in oxygen, whose reaction releases half of the total energy.

In eukaryotes, these redox reactions are catalyzed by a series of protein complexes within the inner mitochondrial membrane; whereas, in prokaryotes, these proteins are located in the cell's plasma membrane. These linked sets of proteins are called the electron transport chain. In mitochondria, five main protein complexes are involved, whereas prokaryotes have various other enzymes, using a variety of electron donors and acceptors.

The energy transferred by electrons flowing through this electron transport chain is used to transport protons across the inner membrane. This generates potential energy in the form of a pH gradient and the resulting electrical potential across this membrane. This store of energy is tapped when protons flow back across the membrane through ATP synthase in a process called chemiosmosis. The ATP synthase uses the energy to transform adenosine diphosphate (ADP) into adenosine triphosphate, in a phosphorylation reaction. The reaction is driven by the proton flow, which forces the rotation of a part of the enzyme. The ATP synthase is a rotary mechanical motor.

Although oxidative phosphorylation is a vital part of metabolism, it produces reactive oxygen species such as superoxide and hydrogen peroxide, which lead to propagation of free radicals, damaging cells and contributing to disease and, possibly, aging and senescence. The enzymes carrying out this metabolic pathway are also the target of many drugs and poisons that inhibit their activities.

== Chemiosmosis ==
Oxidative phosphorylation works by using energy-releasing chemical reactions to drive energy-requiring reactions. The two sets of reactions are said to be coupled. This means one cannot occur without the other. The chain of redox reactions driving the flow of electrons through the electron transport chain, from electron donors such as NADH to electron acceptors such as oxygen and hydrogen (protons), is an exergonic process – it releases energy, whereas the synthesis of ATP is an endergonic process, which requires an input of energy. Both the electron transport chain and the ATP synthase are embedded in a membrane, and energy is transferred from the electron transport chain to the ATP synthase by movements of protons across this membrane, in a process called chemiosmosis. A current of protons is driven from the negative N-side of the membrane to the positive P-side through the proton-pumping enzymes of the electron transport chain. The movement of protons creates an electrochemical gradient across the membrane, which is called the proton-motive force. It has two components: a difference in proton concentration (a H^{+} gradient, ΔpH) and a difference in electric potential, with the N-side having a negative charge.

ATP synthase releases this stored energy by completing the circuit and allowing protons to flow down the electrochemical gradient, back to the N-side of the membrane. The electrochemical gradient drives the rotation of part of the enzyme's structure and couples this motion to the synthesis of ATP.

The two components of the proton-motive force are thermodynamically equivalent: In mitochondria, the largest part of energy is provided by the potential; in alkaliphile bacteria the electrical energy even has to compensate for a counteracting inverse pH difference. Inversely, chloroplasts operate mainly on ΔpH. However, they also require a small membrane potential for the kinetics of ATP synthesis. In the case of the fusobacterium Propionigenium modestum it drives the counter-rotation of subunits a and c of the F_{O} motor of ATP synthase.

The amount of energy released by oxidative phosphorylation is high, compared with the amount produced by fermentation. Glycolysis produces only 2 ATP molecules, but somewhere between 30 and 36 ATPs are produced by the oxidative phosphorylation of the 10 NADH and 2 succinate molecules made by converting one molecule of glucose to carbon dioxide and water, while each cycle of beta oxidation of a fatty acid yields about 14 ATPs. These ATP yields are theoretical maximum values; in practice, some protons leak across the membrane, lowering the yield of ATP.

== Electron and proton transfer molecules ==
Reduction of coenzyme Q from its ubiquinone form (Q) to the reduced ubiquinol form (QH_{2}).

The electron transport chain carries both protons and electrons, passing electrons from donors to acceptors, and transporting protons across a membrane. These processes use both soluble and protein-bound transfer molecules. In the mitochondria, electrons are transferred within the intermembrane space by the water-soluble electron transfer protein cytochrome c. This carries only electrons, and these are transferred by the reduction and oxidation of an iron atom that the protein holds within a heme group in its structure. Cytochrome c is also found in some bacteria, where it is located within the periplasmic space.

Within the inner mitochondrial membrane, the lipid-soluble electron carrier coenzyme Q10 (Q) carries both electrons and protons by a redox cycle. This small benzoquinone molecule is very hydrophobic, so it diffuses freely within the membrane. When Q accepts two electrons and two protons, it becomes reduced to the ubiquinol form (QH_{2}); when QH_{2} releases two electrons and two protons, it becomes oxidized back to the ubiquinone (Q) form. As a result, if two enzymes are arranged so that Q is reduced on one side of the membrane and QH_{2} oxidized on the other, ubiquinone will couple these reactions and shuttle protons across the membrane. Some bacterial electron transport chains use different quinones, such as menaquinone, in addition to ubiquinone.

Within proteins, electrons are transferred between flavin cofactors, iron–sulfur clusters and cytochromes. There are several types of iron–sulfur cluster. The simplest kind found in the electron transfer chain consists of two iron atoms joined by two atoms of inorganic sulfur; these are called [2Fe–2S] clusters. The second kind, called [4Fe–4S], contains a cube of four iron atoms and four sulfur atoms. Each iron atom in these clusters is coordinated by an additional amino acid, usually by the sulfur atom of cysteine. Metal ion cofactors undergo redox reactions without binding or releasing protons, so in the electron transport chain they serve solely to transport electrons through proteins. Electrons move quite long distances through proteins by hopping along chains of these cofactors. This occurs by quantum tunnelling, which is rapid over distances of less than 1.4×10^{−9} m.

== Eukaryotic electron transport chains ==
Many catabolic biochemical processes, such as glycolysis, the citric acid cycle, and beta oxidation, produce the reduced coenzyme NADH. This coenzyme contains electrons that have a high transfer potential; in other words, they will release a large amount of energy upon oxidation. However, the cell does not release this energy all at once, as this would be an uncontrollable reaction. Instead, the electrons are removed from NADH and passed to oxygen through a series of enzymes that each release a small amount of the energy. This set of enzymes, consisting of complexes I through IV, is called the electron transport chain and is found in the inner membrane of the mitochondrion.

In eukaryotes, the enzymes in this electron transport system use the energy released from O_{2} by NADH to pump protons across the inner membrane of the mitochondrion. This causes protons to build up in the intermembrane space, and generates an electrochemical gradient across the membrane. The energy stored in this potential is then used by ATP synthase to produce ATP. Oxidative phosphorylation in the eukaryotic mitochondrion is the best-understood example of this process. The mitochondrion is present in almost all eukaryotes, with the exception of anaerobic protozoa such as Trichomonas vaginalis that instead reduce protons to hydrogen in a remnant mitochondrion called a hydrogenosome.

Typical respiratory enzymes and substrates in eukaryotes.
Respiratory enzyme	Redox pair	Midpoint potential (Volts)
NADH dehydrogenase	NAD^{+} / NADH	−0.32
Succinate dehydrogenase	FMN or FAD / FMNH_{2} or FADH_{2}	−0.20
Cytochrome bc_{1} complex	Coenzyme Q10_{ox} / Coenzyme Q10_{red}	+0.06
Cytochrome bc_{1} complex	Cytochrome b_{ox} / Cytochrome b_{red}	+0.12
Complex IV	Cytochrome c_{ox} / Cytochrome c_{red}	+0.22
Complex IV	Cytochrome a_{ox} / Cytochrome a_{red}	+0.29
Complex IV	O_{2} / HO^{−}	+0.82
Conditions: pH = 7

=== NADH-coenzyme Q oxidoreductase (complex I) ===
Complex I or NADH-Q oxidoreductase. The abbreviations are discussed in the text.

NADH-coenzyme Q oxidoreductase, also known as NADH dehydrogenase or complex I, is the first protein in the electron transport chain. Complex I is a giant enzyme with the mammalian complex I having 46 subunits and a molecular mass of about 1000 kDa. The structure is known in detail only from a bacterium; in most organisms the complex resembles a boot with a large "ball" poking out from the membrane into the mitochondrion. The genes that encode the individual proteins are contained in both the cell nucleus and the mitochondrial genome, as is the case for many enzymes present in the mitochondrion.

The reaction that is catalyzed by this enzyme is the two electron oxidation of NADH by coenzyme Q10 or ubiquinone (represented as Q in the equation below), a lipid-soluble quinone that is found in the mitochondrion membrane:

$\ce{NADH + Q + 5H+_{matrix} -> NAD+ + QH2 + 4H+_{intermembrane}}$	1

The start of the reaction, and indeed of the entire electron chain, is the binding of a NADH molecule to complex I and the donation of two electrons. The electrons enter complex I via a prosthetic group attached to the complex, flavin mononucleotide (FMN). The addition of electrons to FMN converts it to its reduced form, FMNH_{2}. The electrons are then transferred through a series of iron–sulfur clusters: the second kind of prosthetic group present in the complex. There are both [2Fe–2S] and [4Fe–4S] iron–sulfur clusters in complex I.

As the electrons pass through this complex, four protons are pumped from the matrix into the intermembrane space. Exactly how this occurs is unclear, but it seems to involve conformational changes in complex I that cause the protein to bind protons on the N-side of the membrane and release them on the P-side of the membrane. Finally, the electrons are transferred from the chain of iron–sulfur clusters to a ubiquinone molecule in the membrane. Reduction of ubiquinone also contributes to the generation of a proton gradient, as two protons are taken up from the matrix as it is reduced to ubiquinol (QH_{2}).

=== Succinate-Q oxidoreductase (complex II) ===
Complex II: Succinate-Q oxidoreductase.

Succinate-Q oxidoreductase, also known as complex II or succinate dehydrogenase, is a second entry point to the electron transport chain. It is unusual because it is the only enzyme that is part of both the citric acid cycle and the electron transport chain. Complex II consists of four protein subunits and contains a bound flavin adenine dinucleotide (FAD) cofactor, iron–sulfur clusters, and a heme group that does not participate in electron transfer to coenzyme Q, but is believed to be important in decreasing production of reactive oxygen species. It oxidizes succinate to fumarate and reduces ubiquinone. As this reaction releases less energy than the oxidation of NADH, complex II does not transport protons across the membrane and does not contribute to the proton gradient.

$\ce{{Succinate} + Q -> {Fumarate} + QH2}$	2

In some eukaryotes, such as the parasitic worm Ascaris suum, an enzyme similar to complex II, fumarate reductase (menaquinol:fumarate oxidoreductase, or QFR), operates in reverse to oxidize ubiquinol and reduce fumarate. This allows the worm to survive in the anaerobic environment of the large intestine, carrying out anaerobic oxidative phosphorylation with fumarate as the electron acceptor. Another unconventional function of complex II is seen in the malaria parasite Plasmodium falciparum. Here, the reversed action of complex II as an oxidase is important in regenerating ubiquinol, which the parasite uses in an unusual form of pyrimidine biosynthesis.

=== Electron transfer flavoprotein-Q oxidoreductase ===
Electron transfer flavoprotein-ubiquinone oxidoreductase (ETF-Q oxidoreductase), also known as electron transferring-flavoprotein dehydrogenase, is a third entry point to the electron transport chain. It is an enzyme that accepts electrons from electron-transferring flavoprotein in the mitochondrial matrix, and uses these electrons to reduce ubiquinone. This enzyme contains a flavin and a [4Fe–4S] cluster, but, unlike the other respiratory complexes, it attaches to the surface of the membrane and does not cross the lipid bilayer.

$\ce{ETF_{red}{} + Q -> ETF_{ox}{} + QH2}$	3

In mammals, this metabolic pathway is important in beta oxidation of fatty acids and catabolism of amino acids and choline, as it accepts electrons from multiple acetyl-CoA dehydrogenases. In plants, ETF-Q oxidoreductase is also important in the metabolic responses that allow survival in extended periods of darkness.

=== Q-cytochrome c oxidoreductase (complex III) ===
The two electron transfer steps in complex III: Q-cytochrome c oxidoreductase. After each step, Q (in the upper part of the figure) leaves the enzyme.

Q-cytochrome c oxidoreductase is also known as cytochrome c reductase, cytochrome bc_{1} complex, or simply complex III. In mammals, this enzyme is a dimer, with each subunit complex containing 11 protein subunits, an [2Fe-2S] iron–sulfur cluster and three cytochromes: one cytochrome c_{1} and two b cytochromes. A cytochrome is a kind of electron-transferring protein that contains at least one heme group. The iron atoms inside complex III's heme groups alternate between a reduced ferrous (+2) and oxidized ferric (+3) state as the electrons are transferred through the protein.

The reaction catalyzed by complex III is the oxidation of one molecule of ubiquinol and the reduction of two molecules of cytochrome c, a heme protein loosely associated with the mitochondrion. Unlike coenzyme Q, which carries two electrons, cytochrome c carries only one electron.

$\ce{QH2{} + 2 Cyt\, c_{ox}{} + 2H+_{matrix} -> Q{} + 2 Cyt\, c_{red}{} + 4H+_{intermembrane}}$	4

As only one of the electrons can be transferred from the QH_{2} donor to a cytochrome c acceptor at a time, the reaction mechanism of complex III is more elaborate than those of the other respiratory complexes, and occurs in two steps called the Q cycle. In the first step, the enzyme binds three substrates, first, QH_{2}, which is then oxidized, with one electron being passed to the second substrate, cytochrome c. The two protons released from QH_{2} pass into the intermembrane space. The third substrate is Q, which accepts the second electron from the QH_{2} and is reduced to Q^{.−}, which is the ubisemiquinone free radical. The first two substrates are released, but this ubisemiquinone intermediate remains bound. In the second step, a second molecule of QH_{2} is bound and again passes its first electron to a cytochrome c acceptor. The second electron is passed to the bound ubisemiquinone, reducing it to QH_{2} as it gains two protons from the mitochondrial matrix. This QH_{2} is then released from the enzyme.

As coenzyme Q is reduced to ubiquinol on the inner side of the membrane and oxidized to ubiquinone on the other, a net transfer of protons across the membrane occurs, adding to the proton gradient. The rather complex two-step mechanism by which this occurs is important, as it increases the efficiency of proton transfer. If, instead of the Q cycle, one molecule of QH_{2} were used to directly reduce two molecules of cytochrome c, the efficiency would be halved, with only one proton transferred per cytochrome c reduced.

=== Cytochrome c oxidase (complex IV) ===
Complex IV: cytochrome c oxidase.

Cytochrome c oxidase, also known as complex IV, is the final protein complex in the electron transport chain. The mammalian enzyme has an extremely complicated structure and contains 13 subunits, two heme groups, as well as multiple metal ion cofactors – in all, three atoms of copper, one of magnesium and one of zinc.

This enzyme mediates the final reaction in the electron transport chain and transfers electrons to oxygen and hydrogen (protons), while pumping protons across the membrane. The final electron acceptor oxygen is reduced to water in this step. Both the direct pumping of protons and the consumption of matrix protons in the reduction of oxygen contribute to the proton gradient. The reaction catalyzed is the oxidation of cytochrome c and the reduction of oxygen:

$\ce{4 Cyt\,c_{red}{} + O2{} + 8H+_{matrix} -> 4 Cyt\,c_{ox}{} + 2H2O{} + 4H+_{intermembrane}}$	5

=== Alternative reductases and oxidases ===
Many eukaryotic organisms have electron transport chains that differ from the much-studied mammalian enzymes described above. For example, plants have alternative NADH oxidases, which oxidize NADH in the cytosol rather than in the mitochondrial matrix, and pass these electrons to the ubiquinone pool. These enzymes do not transport protons, and, therefore, reduce ubiquinone without altering the electrochemical gradient across the inner membrane.

Another example of a divergent electron transport chain is the alternative oxidase, which is found in plants, as well as some fungi, protists, and possibly some animals. This enzyme transfers electrons directly from ubiquinol to oxygen.

The electron transport pathways produced by these alternative NADH and ubiquinone oxidases have lower ATP yields than the full pathway. The advantages produced by a shortened pathway are not entirely clear. However, the alternative oxidase is produced in response to stresses such as cold, reactive oxygen species, and infection by pathogens, as well as other factors that inhibit the full electron transport chain. Alternative pathways might, therefore, enhance an organism's resistance to injury, by reducing oxidative stress.

=== Organization of complexes ===
The original model for how the respiratory chain complexes are organized was that they diffuse freely and independently in the mitochondrial membrane. However, recent data suggest that the complexes might form higher-order structures called supercomplexes or "respirasomes". In this model, the various complexes exist as organized sets of interacting enzymes. These associations might allow channeling of substrates between the various enzyme complexes, increasing the rate and efficiency of electron transfer. Within such mammalian supercomplexes, some components would be present in higher amounts than others, with some data suggesting a ratio between complexes I/II/III/IV and the ATP synthase of approximately 1:1:3:7:4. However, the debate over this supercomplex hypothesis is not completely resolved, as some data do not appear to fit with this model.

== Prokaryotic electron transport chains ==
In contrast to the general similarity in structure and function of the electron transport chains in eukaryotes, bacteria and archaea possess a large variety of electron-transfer enzymes. These use an equally wide set of chemicals as substrates. In common with eukaryotes, prokaryotic electron transport uses the energy released from the oxidation of a substrate to pump ions across a membrane and generate an electrochemical gradient. For bacteria, oxidative phosphorylation is understood in most detail in Escherichia coli, while archaeal systems are, at present, poorly understood.

The main difference between eukaryotic and prokaryotic oxidative phosphorylation is that bacteria and archaea use many different substances to donate or accept electrons. This allows prokaryotes to grow under a wide variety of environmental conditions. In E. coli, for example, oxidative phosphorylation can be driven by a large number of pairs of reducing agents and oxidizing agents, which are listed below. The midpoint potential of a chemical measures how much energy is released when it is oxidized or reduced, with reducing agents having negative potentials and oxidizing agents positive potentials.

Respiratory enzymes and substrates in E. coli.
Respiratory enzyme	Redox pair	Midpoint potential (Volts)
Ubiquinol oxidase	Oxygen / Water	+0.82
Nitrate reductase	Nitrate / Nitrite	+0.42
Nitrite reductase	Nitrite / Ammonia	+0.36
Dimethyl sulfoxide reductase	DMSO / DMS	+0.16
Trimethylamine N-oxide reductase	TMAO / TMA	+0.13
Fumarate reductase	Fumarate / Succinate	+0.03
Succinate dehydrogenase	Fumarate / Succinate	+0.03
Glucose dehydrogenase	Gluconate / Glucose	−0.14
Glycerol-3-phosphate dehydrogenase	DHAP / Gly-3-P	−0.19
Lactate dehydrogenase	Pyruvate / Lactate	−0.19
NADH dehydrogenase	NAD^{+} / NADH	−0.32
Hydrogenase	Proton / Hydrogen	−0.42
Formate dehydrogenase	Bicarbonate / Formate	−0.43
D-amino acid dehydrogenase	2-oxoacid + ammonia / D-amino acid	?
Pyruvate oxidase	Acetate + Carbon dioxide / Pyruvate	?

As shown above, E. coli can grow with reducing agents such as formate, hydrogen, or lactate as electron donors, and nitrate, DMSO, or oxygen as acceptors. The larger the difference in midpoint potential between an oxidizing and reducing agent, the more energy is released when they react. Out of these compounds, the succinate/fumarate pair is unusual, as its midpoint potential is close to zero. Succinate can therefore be oxidized to fumarate if a strong oxidizing agent such as oxygen is available, or fumarate can be reduced to succinate using a strong reducing agent such as formate. These alternative reactions are catalyzed by succinate dehydrogenase and fumarate reductase, respectively.

Some prokaryotes use redox pairs that have only a small difference in midpoint potential. For example, nitrifying bacteria such as Nitrobacter oxidize nitrite to nitrate, donating the electrons to oxygen. The small amount of energy released in this reaction is enough to pump protons and generate ATP, but not enough to produce NADH or NADPH directly for use in anabolism. This problem is solved by using a nitrite oxidoreductase to produce enough proton-motive force to run part of the electron transport chain in reverse, causing complex I to generate NADH.

Prokaryotes control their use of these electron donors and acceptors by varying which enzymes are produced in response to environmental conditions. This flexibility is possible because different oxidases and reductases use the same ubiquinone pool. This allows many combinations of enzymes to function together, linked by the common ubiquinol intermediate. These respiratory chains therefore have a modular design, with easily interchangeable sets of enzyme systems.

In addition to this metabolic diversity, prokaryotes also possess a range of isozymes – different enzymes that catalyze the same reaction. For example, in E. coli, there are two different types of ubiquinol oxidase using oxygen as an electron acceptor. Under highly aerobic conditions, the cell uses an oxidase with a low affinity for oxygen that can transport two protons per electron. However, if levels of oxygen fall, they switch to an oxidase that transfers only one proton per electron, but has a high affinity for oxygen.

== ATP synthase (complex V) ==
ATP synthase, also called complex V, is the final enzyme in the oxidative phosphorylation pathway. This enzyme is found in all forms of life and functions in the same way in both prokaryotes and eukaryotes. The enzyme uses the energy stored in a proton gradient across a membrane to drive the synthesis of ATP from ADP and phosphate (P_{i}). Estimates of the number of protons required to synthesize one ATP have ranged from three to four, with some suggesting cells can vary this ratio, to suit different conditions.

$\ce{ADP + P_i + 4H+_{intermembrane} <=> ATP + H2O + 4H+_{matrix}}$	6

This phosphorylation reaction is an equilibrium, which can be shifted by altering the proton-motive force. In the absence of a proton-motive force, the ATP synthase reaction will run from right to left, hydrolyzing ATP and pumping protons out of the matrix across the membrane. However, when the proton-motive force is high, the reaction is forced to run in the opposite direction; it proceeds from left to right, allowing protons to flow down their concentration gradient and turning ADP into ATP. Indeed, in the closely related vacuolar type H+-ATPases, the hydrolysis reaction is used to acidify cellular compartments, by pumping protons and hydrolysing ATP.

ATP synthase is a massive protein complex with a mushroom-like shape. The mammalian enzyme complex contains 16 subunits and has a mass of approximately 600 kilodaltons. The portion embedded within the membrane is called F_{O} and contains a ring of c subunits and the proton channel. The stalk and the ball-shaped headpiece is called F_{1} and is the site of ATP synthesis. The ball-shaped complex at the end of the F_{1} portion contains six proteins of two different kinds (three α subunits and three β subunits), whereas the "stalk" consists of one protein: the γ subunit, with the tip of the stalk extending into the ball of α and β subunits. Both the α and β subunits bind nucleotides, but only the β subunits catalyze the ATP synthesis reaction. Reaching along the side of the F_{1} portion and back into the membrane is a long rod-like subunit that anchors the α and β subunits into the base of the enzyme.

As protons cross the membrane through the channel in the base of ATP synthase, the F_{O} proton-driven motor rotates. Rotation might be caused by changes in the ionization of amino acids in the ring of c subunits causing electrostatic interactions that propel the ring of c subunits past the proton channel. This rotating ring in turn drives the rotation of the central axle (the γ subunit stalk) within the α and β subunits. The α and β subunits are prevented from rotating themselves by the side-arm, which acts as a stator. This movement of the tip of the γ subunit within the ball of α and β subunits provides the energy for the active sites in the β subunits to undergo a cycle of movements that produces and then releases ATP.

Mechanism of ATP synthase. ATP is shown in red, ADP and phosphate in pink and the rotating γ subunit in black.

This ATP synthesis reaction is called the binding change mechanism and involves the active site of a β subunit cycling between three states. In the "open" state, ADP and phosphate enter the active site (shown in brown in the diagram). The protein then closes up around the molecules and binds them loosely – the "loose" state (shown in red). The enzyme then changes shape again and forces these molecules together, with the active site in the resulting "tight" state (shown in pink) binding the newly produced ATP molecule with very high affinity. Finally, the active site cycles back to the open state, releasing ATP and binding more ADP and phosphate, ready for the next cycle.

In some bacteria and archaea, ATP synthesis is driven by the movement of sodium ions through the cell membrane, rather than the movement of protons. Archaea such as Methanococcus also contain the A_{1}A_{o} synthase, a form of the enzyme that contains additional proteins with little similarity in sequence to other bacterial and eukaryotic ATP synthase subunits. It is possible that, in some species, the A_{1}A_{o} form of the enzyme is a specialized sodium-driven ATP synthase, but this might not be true in all cases.

== Reactive oxygen species ==
Molecular oxygen is a good terminal electron acceptor because it is a strong oxidizing agent. The reduction of oxygen does involve potentially harmful intermediates. Although the transfer of four electrons and four protons reduces oxygen to water, which is harmless, transfer of one or two electrons produces superoxide or peroxide anions, which are dangerously reactive.

$\ce{O2 ->[\ce{e^-}] \underset{Superoxide}{O2^{\underline{\bullet}}} ->[\ce{e^-}] \underset{Peroxide}{O2^{2-}}}$	7

These reactive oxygen species and their reaction products, such as the hydroxyl radical, are very harmful to cells, as they oxidize proteins and cause mutations in DNA. This cellular damage may contribute to disease and is proposed as one cause of aging.

The cytochrome c oxidase complex is highly efficient at reducing oxygen to water, and it releases very few partly reduced intermediates; however small amounts of superoxide anion and peroxide are produced by the electron transport chain. Particularly important is the reduction of coenzyme Q in complex III, as a highly reactive ubisemiquinone free radical is formed as an intermediate in the Q cycle. This unstable species can lead to electron "leakage" when electrons transfer directly to oxygen, forming superoxide. As the production of reactive oxygen species by these proton-pumping complexes is greatest at high membrane potentials, it has been proposed that mitochondria regulate their activity to maintain the membrane potential within a narrow range that balances ATP production against oxidant generation. For instance, oxidants can activate uncoupling proteins that reduce membrane potential.

To counteract these reactive oxygen species, cells contain numerous antioxidant systems, including antioxidant vitamins such as vitamin C and vitamin E, and antioxidant enzymes such as superoxide dismutase, catalase, and peroxidases, which detoxify the reactive species, limiting damage to the cell.

== In hypoxic/anoxic conditions ==
As oxygen is fundamental for oxidative phosphorylation, a shortage in O_{2} level can alter ATP production rates. The proton motive force and ATP production can be maintained by intracellular acidosis. Cytosolic protons that have accumulated with ATP hydrolysis and lactic acidosis can freely diffuse across the mitochondrial outer-membrane and acidify the inter-membrane space, hence directly contributing to the proton motive force and ATP production.

When exposed to hypoxia/anoxia (no oxygen), most animals will see damage done to their mitochondria. From some species, these conditions can happen due to environmental variables, such as low tides, low temperatures, or general living conditions, like living in a hypoxic underground burrow. In humans, these conditions are commonly met in medical emergencies such as strokes, ischemia, and asphyxia.

=== Endotherms ===
==== Hypoxia/anoxia intolerance ====
Most mammals and birds are intolerant to low/no oxygen conditions. For the heart, in the absence of oxygen, the first four complexes of the electron transport chain decrease in activity. This will lead to protons leaking through the inner mitochondrial membrane without complexes I, III, and IV pushing protons back through to maintain the proton gradient. There is also electron leak (an event where electrons leak out of the electron transport chain), which happens because NADH dehydrogenase within Complex I becomes damaged, which allows for the production of ROS (reactive oxygen species) during ischemia. This will lead to the reversing of Complex V, which forces protons from the matrix back into the inner membrane space, against their concentration gradient. Forcing protons against their concentration gradient requires energy, so Complex V uses up ATP as an energy source.

==== Reoxygenation of intolerant animals ====
When oxygen re-enters the system, animals are faced with a different set of problems. Since ATP was used up during the anoxic period, it leads to a lack of ADP within the system. This is due to ADP's natural degradation into AMP, resulting in ADP being drained from the system. With no ADP in the system, Complex V is unable to start, meaning the protons will not flow through it to enter the matrix. Due to Complex V's reversal during anoxia, the proton gradient has become hyperpolarized (where the proton gradient is highly positively charged). Another factor in this problem is that succinate built up during anoxia, so when oxygen is reintroduced, succinate donates electrons to Complex II. The hyperpolarized gradient and succinate buildup leads to reverse electron transport, causing oxidative stress, which can lead to cellular damage and diseases.

==== Hypoxia/anoxia tolerance ====
The naked mole rat (Heterocephalus glaber) is a hypoxia-tolerant species that sleeps in deep burrows and in large colonies. The depth of these burrows reduces access to oxygen, and sleeping in large groups will deplete the area of oxygen quicker than usual, leading to hypoxia. The naked mole rat has the unique ability to survive low oxygen conditions for no less than several hours, and zero oxygen conditions for 18 minutes. One of the ways of combatting hypoxia in the brain is decreasing the reliance on oxygen for ATP production, achieved by decreased respiration rates and proton leak.

==== Reoxygenation of tolerant animals ====
Hypoxia/anoxia tolerant species handle ROS production during reoxygenation better than the intolerant. In the cortex of the naked mole rats, they show better homeostasis of ROS production than intolerant species and seem to lack the burst of ROS that typically comes with reoxygenation.

=== Ectotherms ===
==== Hypoxia/anoxia intolerance ====
Research on intolerant ectotherms is more limited than on tolerant ectotherms and intolerant endotherms, but it is shown that anoxia/hypoxia intolerance is different in terms for how long the intolerant survive as opposed to the tolerant between endotherms and ectotherms. While intolerant endotherms only last minutes, intolerant ectotherms can last hours, such as subtidal scallops (Argopecten irradians). This difference in intolerance could be due to a couple of different factors. One advantage is that the ectothermic inner mitochondrial membrane is less leaky, so less protons will leak through the inner membrane due to differences in the phospholipid bilayer composition. Another advantage ectotherms tend to have in this category is an ability for their mitochondria to properly function in a wide range of temperatures, such as the western fence lizard (Sceloporus occidentalis). While western fence lizards are not considered a hypoxia-tolerant animal, they still showed less temperature sensitivity in their mitochondria than mice mitochondria.

==== Reoxygenation of intolerant animals ====
While it is unclear how reoxygenation affects intolerant ectotherms at the mitochondrial level, there is some research showing how some of them respond. In the hypoxia-sensitive shovelnose ray (Aptychotrema rostrata), it is shown that ROS production is lower upon reoxygenation compared to rays only exposed to normoxia (normal oxygen levels). This differs from the hypoxia-sensitive endotherm, which would see an increase in ROS production. However, the ray's levels were still higher than the more hypoxia-tolerant Epaulette shark (Hemiscyllum ocellatum), which potentially sees hypoxia due to the bouts of low tides that can be seen in reef platforms. Subtidal scallops will see both a decrease in maximal respiration and a depolarization of the membrane during reoxygenation.

==== Hypoxia/anoxia tolerance ====
Hypoxia/Anoxia tolerant ectotherms have shown unique strategies for surviving anoxia. Pond turtles, such as the painted turtle (Chrysemys picta bellii), will experience anoxia during winter while they overwinter at the bottom of frozen ponds. In their cardiac mitochondria, the reversing of Complex V, the usage of ATP, and the build-up of succinate are all prevented during anoxia. Crucian carps (Carassius carassius) also overwinter in frozen ponds and show no loss membrane potential in their cardiac mitochondria during anoxia, but this relies on complexes I and III to be active.

==== Reoxygenation of tolerant animals ====
Pond turtles are able to completely avoid ROS production upon reoxygenation. However, crucian carp cannot and are unable to prevent the death of brain cells upon reoxygenation.

== Inhibitors ==
There are several well-known drugs and toxins that inhibit oxidative phosphorylation. Although any one of these toxins inhibits only one enzyme in the electron transport chain, inhibition of any step in this process will halt the rest of the process. For example, if oligomycin inhibits ATP synthase, protons cannot pass back into the mitochondrion. As a result, the proton pumps are unable to operate, as the gradient becomes too strong for them to overcome. NADH is then no longer oxidized and the citric acid cycle ceases to operate because the concentration of NAD^{+} falls below the concentration that these enzymes can use.

Many site-specific inhibitors of the electron transport chain have contributed to the present knowledge of mitochondrial respiration. Synthesis of ATP is also dependent on the electron transport chain, so all site-specific inhibitors also inhibit ATP formation. The fish poison rotenone, the barbiturate drug amytal, and the antibiotic piericidin A inhibit NADH and coenzyme Q.

Carbon monoxide, cyanide, hydrogen sulfide and azide effectively inhibit cytochrome oxidase. Carbon monoxide reacts with the reduced form of the cytochrome while cyanide and azide react with the oxidised form. An antibiotic, antimycin A, and British anti-Lewisite, an antidote used against chemical weapons, are the two important inhibitors of the site between cytochrome B and C1.

Compounds	Use	Site of action	Effect on oxidative phosphorylation
Cyanide; Carbon monoxide Azide; Hydrogen sulfide	Poisons	Complex IV	Inhibit the electron transport chain by binding more strongly than oxygen to the Fe–Cu center in cytochrome c oxidase, preventing the reduction of oxygen.
Oligomycin	Antibiotic	Complex V	Inhibits ATP synthase by blocking the flow of protons through the F_{o} subunit.
CCCP; 2,4-Dinitrophenol	Poisons, weight-loss (Note: DNP was extensively used as an anti-obesity medication in the 1930s but was ultimately discontinued due to its dangerous side effects. However, illicit use of the drug for this purpose continues today. See 2,4-Dinitrophenol#Dieting aid for more information.)	Inner membrane	Ionophores that disrupt the proton gradient by carrying protons across a membrane. This ionophore uncouples proton pumping from ATP synthesis because it carries protons across the inner mitochondrial membrane.
Rotenone	Pesticide	Complex I	Prevents the transfer of electrons from complex I to ubiquinone by blocking the ubiquinone-binding site.
Malonate and oxaloacetate	Poisons	Complex II	Competitive inhibitors of succinate dehydrogenase (complex II).
Antimycin A	Piscicide	Complex III	Binds to the Qi site of cytochrome c reductase, thereby inhibiting the oxidation of ubiquinol.

Not all inhibitors of oxidative phosphorylation are toxins. In brown adipose tissue, regulated proton channels called uncoupling proteins can uncouple respiration from ATP synthesis. This rapid respiration produces heat, and is particularly important as a way of maintaining body temperature for hibernating animals, although these proteins may also have a more general function in cells' responses to stress.

== History ==
The field of oxidative phosphorylation began with the report in 1906 by Arthur Harden of a vital role for phosphate in cellular fermentation, but initially only sugar phosphates were known to be involved. However, in the early 1940s, the link between the oxidation of sugars and the generation of ATP was firmly established by Herman Kalckar, confirming the central role of ATP in energy transfer that had been proposed by Fritz Albert Lipmann in 1941. Later, in 1949, Morris Friedkin and Albert L. Lehninger proved that the coenzyme NADH linked metabolic pathways such as the citric acid cycle and the synthesis of ATP. The term oxidative phosphorylation was coined by Volodymyr Belitser in 1939.

For another twenty years, the mechanism by which ATP is generated remained mysterious, with scientists searching for an elusive "high-energy intermediate" that would link oxidation and phosphorylation reactions. This puzzle was solved by Peter D. Mitchell with the publication of the chemiosmotic theory in 1961. At first, this proposal was highly controversial, but it was slowly accepted and Mitchell was awarded a Nobel prize in 1978. Subsequent research concentrated on purifying and characterizing the enzymes involved, with major contributions being made by David E. Green on the complexes of the electron-transport chain, as well as Efraim Racker on the ATP synthase. A critical step towards solving the mechanism of the ATP synthase was provided by Paul D. Boyer, by his development in 1973 of the "binding change" mechanism, followed by his radical proposal of rotational catalysis in 1982. More recent work has included structural studies on the enzymes involved in oxidative phosphorylation by John E. Walker, with Walker and Boyer being awarded a Nobel Prize in 1997.

== See also ==
- Respirometry
- TIM/TOM Complex
