= Ascofuranone =

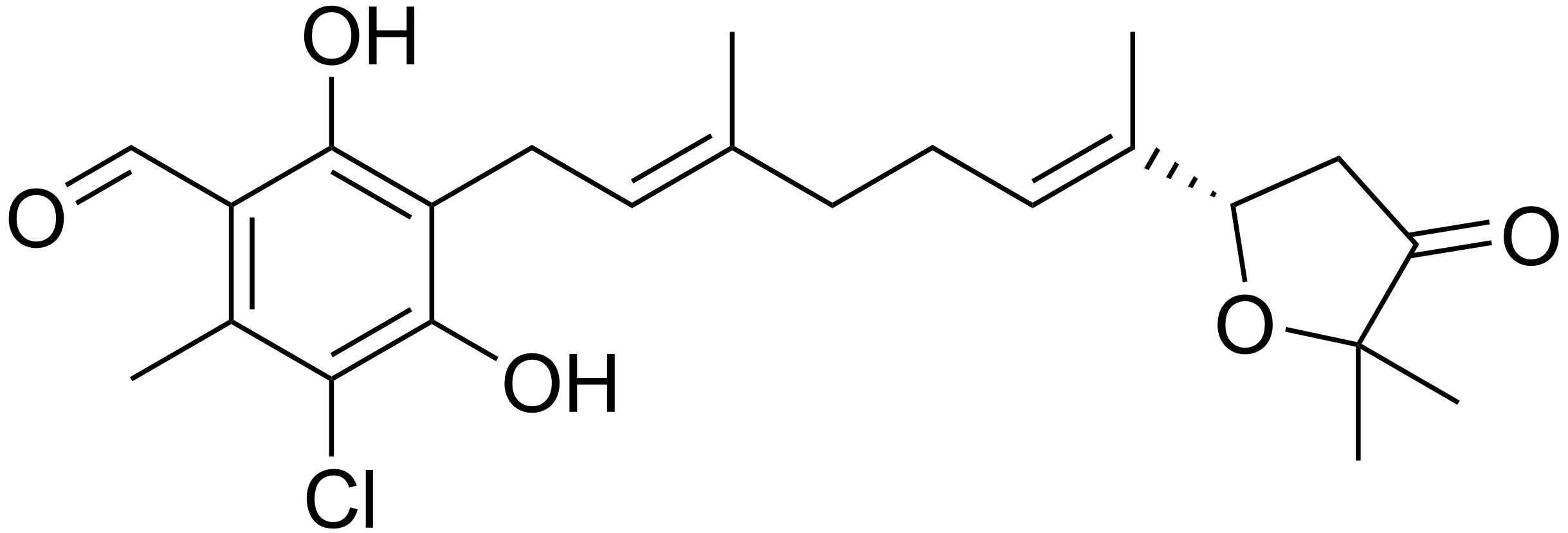

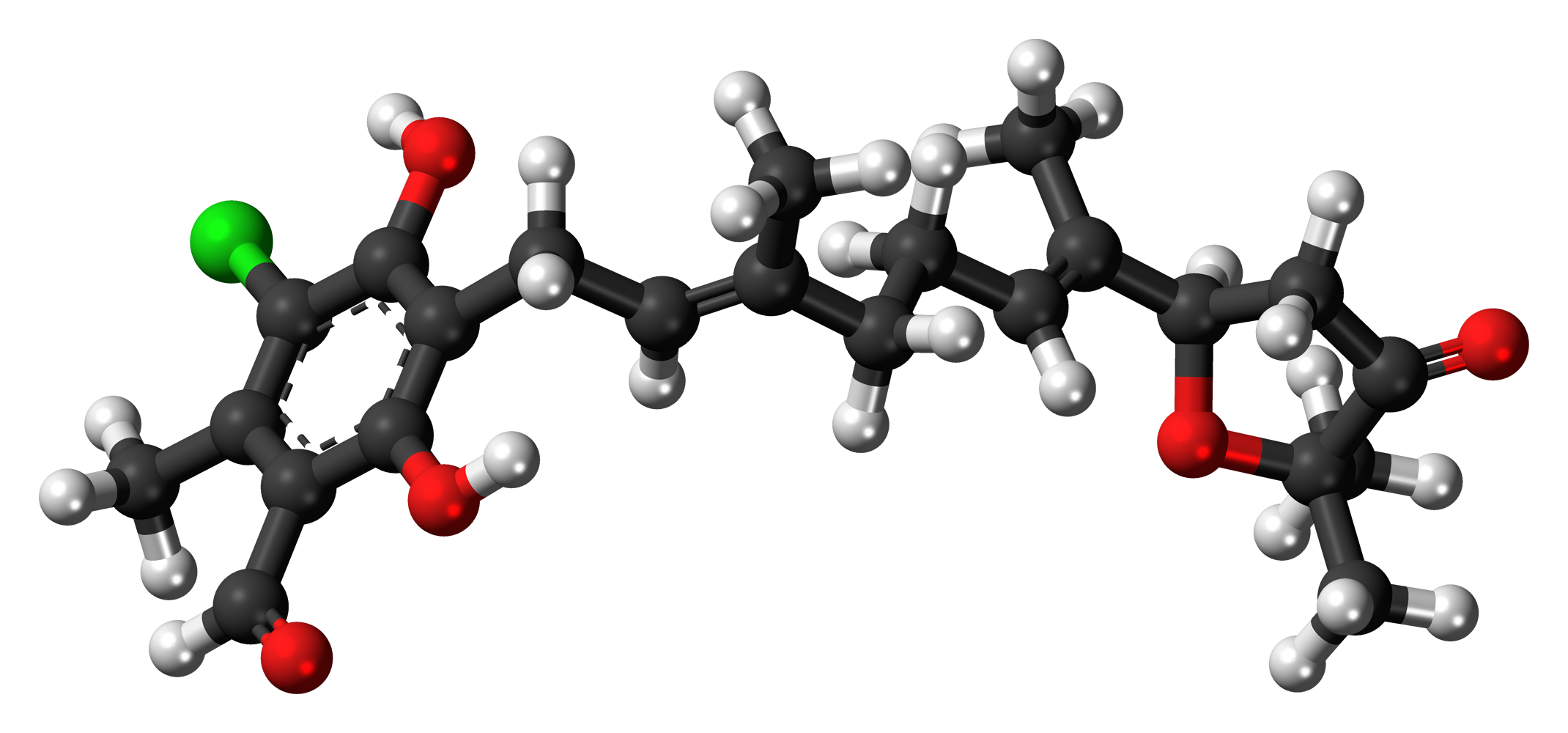

Names
- Preferred IUPAC name 3-Chloro-5-{(2E,6E)-7-[(2S)-5,5-dimethyl-4-oxooxolan-2-yl]-3-methylocta-2,6-dien-1-yl}-4,6-dihydroxy-2-methylbenzaldehyde
- Other names Ascofuranon

Identifiers
CAS Number	38462-04-3
3D model (JSmol)	Interactive image
ChEBI	CHEBI:156148
ChEMBL	ChEMBL133046
ChemSpider	4939184
PubChem CID	6434242
UNII	I31EFB9515
CompTox Dashboard (EPA)	DTXSID60903967
- InChI: InChI=1S/C23H29ClO5/c1-13(7-6-8-14(2)18-11-19(26)23(4,5)29-18)9-10-16-21(27)17(12-25)15(3)20(24)22(16)28/h8-9,12,18,27-28H,6-7,10-11H2,1-5H3/b13-9+,14-8+/t18-/m0/s1 Key: VGYPZLGWVQQOST-JUERRSSISA-N; InChI=1/C23H29ClO5/c1-13(7-6-8-14(2)18-11-19(26)23(4,5)29-18)9-10-16-21(27)17(12-25)15(3)20(24)22(16)28/h8-9,12,18,27-28H,6-7,10-11H2,1-5H3/b13-9+,14-8+/t18-/m0/s1 Key: VGYPZLGWVQQOST-JUERRSSIBJ
- SMILES: O=Cc1c(O)c(c(O)c(Cl)c1C)C/C=C(/CC/C=C(\C)[C@H]2OC(C(=O)C2)(C)C)C

Properties
Chemical formula	C_{23}H_{29}ClO_{5}
Molar mass	420.93 g·mol^{−1}
Density	1.207 g/mL
Boiling point	581.2 °C (1,078.2 °F; 854.4 K)
- Except where otherwise noted, data are given for materials in their standard state (at 25 °C [77 °F], 100 kPa). verify (what is ?) Infobox references

Ascofuranone is an antibiotic produced by various ascomycete fungi including Acremonium sclerotigenum that inhibits the Trypanosoma brucei alternative oxidase and is a lead compound in efforts to produce other drugs targeting this enzyme for the treatment of sleeping sickness. The compound is effective both in vitro cell culture and in infections in mice.

Ascofuranone has also been reported to have anti-tumor activity, and modulate the immune system.

== Biosynthesis ==
The proposed biosynthesis of ascofuranone was reported by Kita et al., as well as by Abe et al. The prenylation of orsellinic acid, followed by terminal cyclization through epoxidation is how ascofuranone can be synthesized. Compound (1), ilicicolinic acid B, was found to be produced from polyketide synthase (PKS) StBA and that AscCABD are responsible for the biosynthesis of ilicicolin A (3). Ilicicolin B (2) was found to be produced by expressing AscC (polyketide synthase) which is then followed by expression of AscA (prenyltransferase). AscD (flavin-dependent halogenase, flavin binding enzyme) is able to catalyze the chlorination of ilicicolinic acid B (2) to yield ilicicolin A (3).

Expodiation of (3) by AscE (P450 monooxygenase) leads to the formation of ilicicolin A epoxide (4). Ilicicolin A epoxide can then be hydroxylated by AscH at C-16 (P450 monooygenase) to yield intermediate (5) which can then be cyclized by AscI (eight-transmembrane protein, TPC) into ascofuranol (6), specifically through 6-endo-tet cyclization. Finally, ascofuranol (6) can be oxidized by AscJ (NAD(P)-dependent alcohol dehydrogenase) leading to the formation of ascofuranone.

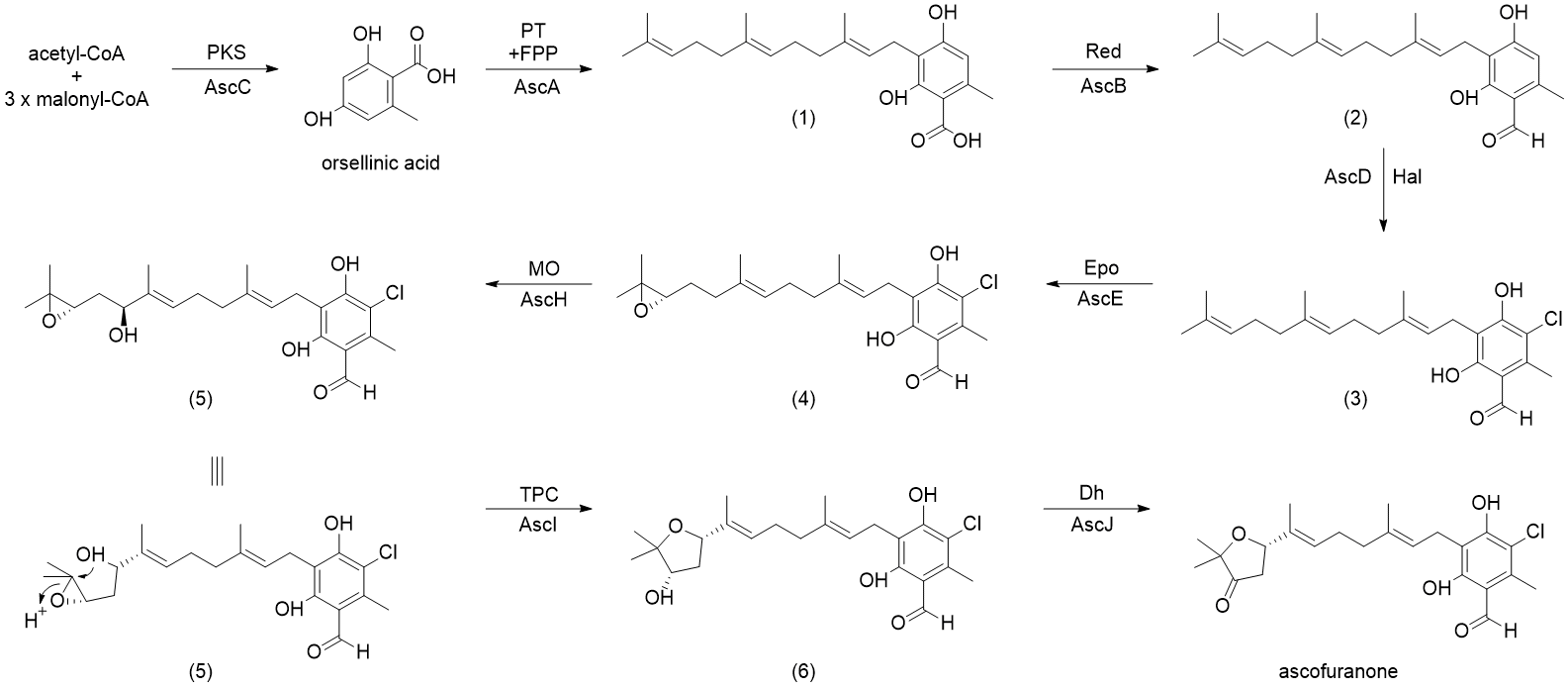
Biosynthetic Pathway
