= Trimethylamine N-oxide reductase =

trimethylamine-N-oxide reductase

Identifiers
- EC no.: 1.7.2.3
- CAS no.: 37256-34-1

Databases
- IntEnz: IntEnz view
- BRENDA: BRENDA entry
- ExPASy: NiceZyme view
- KEGG: KEGG entry
- MetaCyc: metabolic pathway
- PRIAM: profile
- PDB structures: RCSB PDB PDBe PDBsum
- Gene Ontology: AmiGO / QuickGO
Search
- PMC: articles
- PubMed: articles
- NCBI: proteins

Trimethylamine N-oxide reductase (TOR or TMAO reductase, EC 1.7.2.3) is a microbial enzyme that can reduce trimethylamine N-oxide (TMAO) into trimethylamine (TMA), as part of the electron transport chain. The enzyme has been purified from E. coli and the photosynthetic bacteria Roseobacter denitrificans.

Trimethylamine oxide is found at high concentrations in the tissues of fish, and the bacterial reduction of this compound to foul-smelling trimethylamine is a major process in the spoilage of fish.

== Classification ==
TMAO reductase has an enzyme commission (EC) number of 1.7.2.3. EC numbers are a system of enzyme nomenclature, and each part of this nomenclature refers to a progressive classification of the enzyme with regards to its reaction. The first number defines the reaction type, the second number provides information on involved compounds, the third number specifies the type of reaction, and the fourth number completes the unique serial number for each enzyme.

Trimethylamine N-oxide reductase has the EC number 1.7.2.3, and these components refer to the following enzyme classifications:

- EC 1 enzymes are oxidoreductase enzymes, where an oxidation reduction reaction occurs, and the substrate being oxidized is either an oxygen or hydrogen donor
- EC 1.7 enzymes act on other nitrogenous compounds as donors
- EC 1.7.2 enzymes have a cytochrome as an acceptor
- EC 1.7.2.3 is the enzyme TMAO reductase, which reduces the cytochrome TorC

== Species distribution ==
TMAO is an organic osmolyte that has the useful biological function of protecting proteins against denaturing stresses such as high concentration of urea. Various bacteria grow anaerobically using TMAO as an alternative electron transport chain, allowing for growth on non-fermentable carbon sources such as glycerol. Bacteria capable of reducing TMAO to TMA are found throughout three different ecological niches. TMAO-reducing, to date, has been observed in marine bacteria, photosynthetic bacteria living in shallow ponds, and in enterobacteria.

TMAO reductases have been studied in several organisms, and a common conserved feature is the presence of a molybdenum cofactor in all the known terminal enzymes.

Based on their substrate specificity, these enzymes can be divided into two groups:

- TMAO reductases which have high substrate specificity
- DMSO/TMAO reductases which can reduce a broad range of N and S-oxide substrates.

The first group consists of species such as Escherichia coli, Shewanella putrefaciens, and Roseobacter denitrificans while the second group consists of species such as Proteus vulgaris, Rhodobacter capsulatus, and Rhodobacter sphaeroides.

The TMAO respiratory system has been mostly widely studied at the molecular level in E. coli and Rhodobacter species.

== Reaction mechanism ==
In E. coli, TMAO reductase is encoded by the torCAD operon. The torC gene encodes a pentahemic c-type cytochrome (TorC). TorC is likely to transfer electrons directly to the periplasmic TorA terminal enzyme encoded by the torA gene. The anaerobic expression of the torCAD operon is strictly controlled by the presence of TMAO or related compounds.

There are several different metabolic pathways that involve TMAO and TMA. The reduction of TMAO to TMA, catalyzed by TMAO reductase, as part of the electron transport chain follows the following reaction:

NADH + H^{+} + trimethylamine N-oxide $\rightleftharpoons$ NAD^{+} + trimethylamine + H_{2}O However, both the R. denitrificans and E. coli enzymes can accept electrons from cytochromes:

trimethylamine + 2 (ferricytochrome c)-subunit + H_{2}O → trimethylamine N-oxide + 2 (ferrocytochrome c)-subunit + 2 H^{+}

Other reactions involving TMAO and TMA include:

- The oxidation of TMA to TMAO, which occurs in some methylotrophs as an initial step in utilizing TMA as a source of carbon
- The demethylation of TMAO to dimethylamine and formaldehyde by methylotrophs
- The oxidative demethylation of TMA to dimethylamine and formaldehyde by methylotrophs
- The production of methane from TMA and other methylamines by some methanogens

== Structure ==
In E. coli, it has been shown that an inducible, periplasmic TMAO reductase is responsible for almost all TMAO reduction (with the rest being DMSO reduction). While no structural analysis of this E. coli enzyme has been reported, TMAO reductase from Shewanella massilia has been isolated and characterized at a resolution of 2.5 Å.

TMAO reductases have been studied in several organisms, and a common feature is the presence of a molybdenum cofactor in all the known terminal enzymes. The common form of the molybdopterin molecule is a tricyclic ring system comprising a pterin group fused to a pyran ring. The role of this pyran ring could be a way of controlling the oxidation state of the molybdenum cofactor and/or facilitating proton diffusion. Furthermore, the arrangement of aromatic residues in the funnel-like entrance leading to the active center is closely related to that of DMSO reductase structures. A hydrophobic pocket, formed by two tryptophan and two tyrosine residues, is also present in the TMAO reductase and contains highly conserved residues.

When comparing TMAO reductase of S. massilia to DMSO reductase from R. Sphaeroides and R. capsulatus, the overall structure is strikingly similar. However, one major difference in TMAO reductase is a missing tyrosine (Tyr114), in DMSO reductase of R. capsulatus. It is replaced by a threonine (Thr116) in the TMAO reductase, and the backbone stretch around this residue, from residue 100 to 116, is not identical to that in the DMSO reductases. A direct consequence of the missing residue is a wider accessible space, adjacent to the molybdenum active center, which potentially exists to accommodates the somewhat bulkier trimethylamine-oxide molecules more easily than the dimethylsulfoxide molecules. This different demonstrates how an enzyme's form is almost always directly tied to its function.

However, recent discrepancies have risen regarding the structure of the TMAO reductase active site. The proposed active site contains several anomalous bond lengths; one Mo-O bond length is too short for a Mo-O single-bond coordination, and the four Mo-S bond lengths are all considerably longer than expected. Moreover, the proposed molybdenum coordination of the active site is extremely crowded, with the distances between several supposedly nonbonding atoms being significantly shorter than the sum of their van der Waals radii and some bond angles being unreasonably small. Now, it is being hypothesized that this overcrowding is due to the cocrystallization of multiple forms of the enzyme.

== See also ==
- Oxidative phosphorylation
- Microbial metabolism
