= Plastid terminal oxidase =

Plastid terminal oxidase or plastoquinol terminal oxidase (PTOX) is an enzyme that resides on the thylakoid membranes of plant and algae chloroplasts and on the membranes of cyanobacteria. The enzyme was hypothesized to exist as a photosynthetic oxidase in 1982 and was verified by sequence similarity to the mitochondrial alternative oxidase (AOX). The two oxidases evolved from a common ancestral protein in prokaryotes, and they are so functionally and structurally similar that a thylakoid-localized AOX can restore the function of a PTOX knockout.

== Function ==
Plastid terminal oxidase catalyzes the oxidation of the plastoquinone pool, which exerts a variety of effects on the development and functioning of plant chloroplasts.

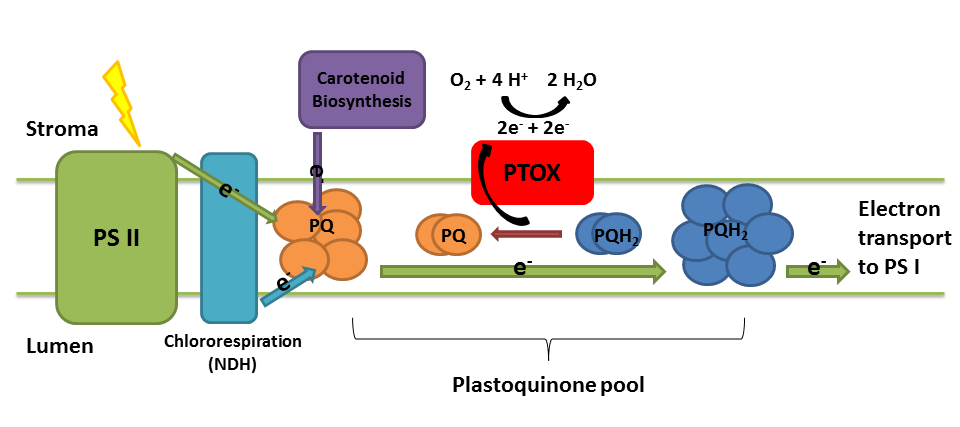
A summary of the pathways plastid terminal oxidase plays a role in through oxidation of the quinone pool

=== Carotenoid biosynthesis and plastid development ===
The enzyme is important for carotenoid biosynthesis during chloroplast biogenesis. In developing plastids, its activity prevents the over-reduction of the plastoquinone pool. Knockout plants for PTOX exhibit phenotypes of variegated leaves with white patches. Without the enzyme, the carotenoid synthesis pathway slows down due to the lack of oxidized plastoquinone with which to oxidize phytoene, a carotenoid intermediate. The colorless compound phytoene accumulates in the leaves, resulting in white patches of cells. PTOX is also thought to determine the redox poise of the developing photosynthetic apparatus and without it, plants fail to assemble organized internal membrane structures in chloroplasts when exposed to high light during early development.

=== Photoprotection ===
Plants deficient in the IMMUTANS gene that encodes the oxidase are especially susceptible to photooxidative stress during early plastid development. The knockout plants exhibit a phenotype of variegated leaves with white patches that indicate a lack of pigmentation or photodamage. This effect is enhanced with increased light and temperature during plant development. The lack of plastid terminal oxidase indirectly causes photodamage during plastid development because protective carotenoids are not synthesized without the oxidase.

The enzyme is also thought to act as a safety valve for stress conditions in the photosynthetic apparatus. By providing an electron sink when the plastoquinone pool is over-reduced, the oxidase is thought to protect photosystem II from oxidative damage. Knockouts for Rubisco and photosystem II complexes, which would experience more photodamage than normal, exhibit an upregulation of plastid terminal oxidase. This effect is not universal because it requires plants to have additional PTOX regulation mechanisms. While many studies agree with the stress-protective role of the enzyme, one study showed that overexpression of PTOX in tobacco (Nicotiana tabacum) increases the production of reactive oxygen species and causes more photodamage than normal. This finding suggests that an efficient antioxidant system is required for the oxidase to function as a safety valve for stress conditions and that it is more important during chloroplast biogenesis than in the regular functioning of the chloroplast.

=== Chlororespiration and electron flux ===
The most confirmed function of plastid terminal oxidase in developed chloroplasts is its role in chlororespiration. In this process, NADPH dehydrogenase (NDH) reduces the quinone pool and the terminal oxidase oxidizes it, serving the same function as cytochrome c oxidase from mitochondrial electron transport. In Chlamydomonas, there are two copies of the gene for the oxidase. PTOX2 significantly contributes to the flux of electrons through chlororespiration in the dark. There is also evidence from experiments with tobacco that it functions in plant chlororespiration as well.

In fully developed chloroplasts, prolonged exposure to light increases the activity of the oxidase. Because the enzyme acts at the plastoquinone pool in between photosystem II and photosystem I, it may play a role in controlling electron flow through photosynthesis by acting as an alternative electron sink. Similar to its role in carotenoid synthesis, its oxidase activity may prevent the over-reduction of photosystem I electron acceptors and damage by photoinhibition. A recent analysis of electron flux through the photosynthetic pathway shows that even when activated, the electron flux plastid terminal oxidase diverts is two orders of magnitude less than the total flux through photosynthetic electron transport. This suggests that the protein may play less of a role than previously thought in relieving the oxidative stress in photosynthesis.

== Structure ==
Plastid terminal oxidase is an integral membrane protein, or more specifically, an integral monotopic protein and is bound to the thylakoid membrane facing the stroma. Based on sequence homology, the enzyme is predicted to contain four alpha helix domains that encapsulate a di-iron center. The two iron atoms are ligated by six essential conserved histidine and glutamate residues – Glu136, Glu175, His171, Glu227, Glu296, and His299. The predicted structure is similar to that of the alternative oxidase, with an additional Exon 8 domain that is required for the plastid oxidase's activity and stability. The enzyme is anchored to the membrane by a short fifth alpha helix that contains a Tyr212 residue hypothesized to be involved in substrate binding.

== Mechanism ==
The oxidase catalyzes the transfer of four electrons from reduced plastoquinone to molecular oxygen to form water . The net reaction is written below:

2 QH_{2} + O_{2} → 2 Q + 2 H_{2}O

Analysis of substrate specificity revealed that the enzyme almost exclusively catalyzes the reduction of plastoquinone over other quinones such as ubiquinone and duroquinone. Additionally, iron is essential for the catalytic function of the enzyme and cannot be substituted by another metal cation like Cu^{2+}, Zn^{2+}, or Mn^{2+} at the catalytic center.

It is unlikely that four electrons could be transferred at once in a single iron cluster, so all of the proposed mechanisms involve two separate two-electron transfers from reduced plastoquinone to the di-iron center. In the first step common to all proposed mechanisms, one plastoquinone is oxidized and both irons are reduced from iron(III) to iron(II). Four different mechanisms are proposed for the next step, oxygen capture. One mechanism proposes a peroxide intermediate, after which one oxygen atom is used to create water and another is left bound in a diferryl configuration. Upon one more plastoquinone oxidation, a second water molecule is formed and the irons return to a +3 oxidation state. The other mechanisms involve the formation of Fe(III)-OH or Fe(IV)-OH and a tyrosine radical. These radical-based mechanisms could explain why over-expression of the PTOX gene causes increased generation of reactive oxygen species.

== Evolution ==
The enzyme is present in organisms capable of oxygenic photosynthesis, which includes plants, algae, and cyanobacteria. Plastid terminal oxidase and alternative oxidase are thought to have originated from a common ancestral di-iron carboxylate protein. Oxygen reductase activity was likely an ancient mechanism to scavenge oxygen in the early transition from an anaerobic to aerobic world. The plastid oxidase first evolved in ancient cyanobacteria and the alternative oxidase in Pseudomonadota before eukaryotic evolution and endosymbiosis events. Through endosymbiosis, the plastid oxidase was vertically inherited by eukaryotes that evolved into plants and algae. Sequenced genomes of various plant and algae species shows that the amino acid sequence is more than 25% conserved, which is a significant amount of conservation for an oxidase. This sequence conservation further supports the theory that both the alternative and plastid oxidases evolved before endosymbiosis and did not significantly change through eukaryote evolution.

There also exist PTOX cyanophages that contain copies of the gene for the plastid oxidase. They are known to act as viral vectors for movement of the gene between cyanobacterial species. Some evidence suggests that the phages may use the oxidase to influence photosynthetic electron flow to produce more ATP and less NADPH because viral synthesis utilizes more ATP.

== See also ==
- Alternative oxidase
- Metalloprotein
