= NAD(P)H dehydrogenase (quinone) =

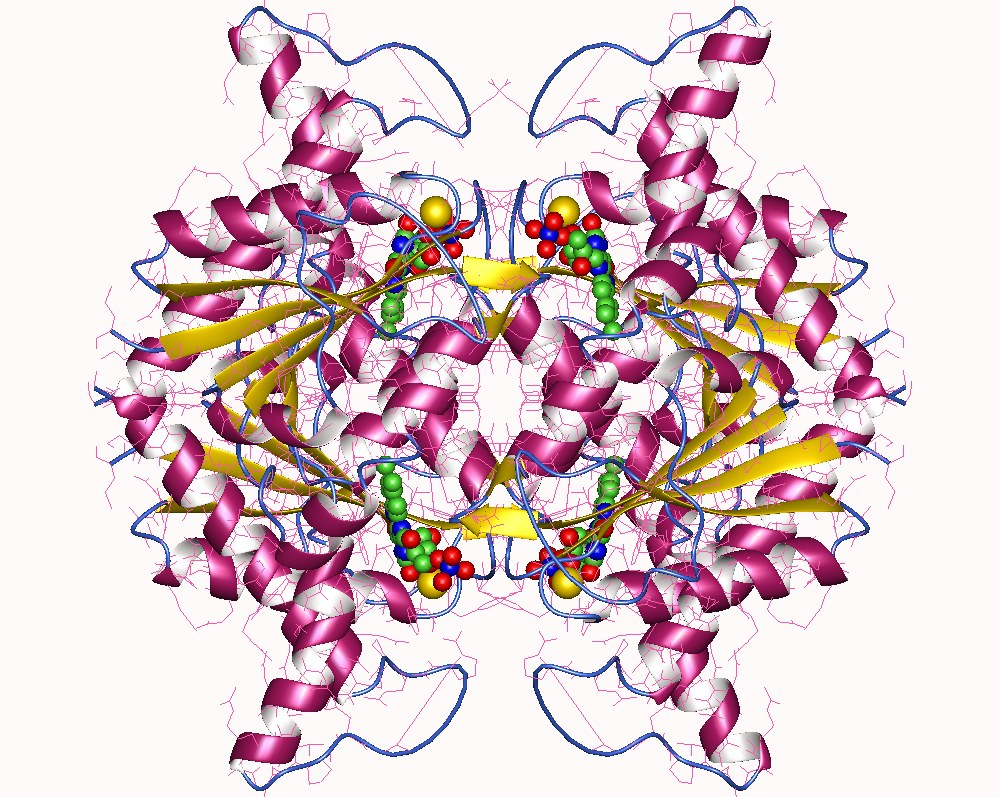
- NAD(P)H dehydrogenase (quinone) tetramer, Brucella abortus

Identifiers
- EC no.: 1.6.5.2
- CAS no.: 9032-20-6

Databases
- BRENDA: enzyme data
- ExPASy: NiceZyme view
- KEGG: enzyme entry
- MetaCyc: metabolic pathway
- Rhea: reactions
- PDB structures: RCSB PDB PDBe PDBsum
- Gene Ontology: AmiGO / QuickGO
Search
- PMC: articles
- PubMed: articles
- NCBI: proteins

In enzymology, a NAD(P)H dehydrogenase (quinone) (EC 1.6.5.2) is an enzyme that catalyzes the chemical reaction

NAD(P)H + H^{+} + a quinone $\rightleftharpoons$ NAD(P)^{+} + a hydroquinone

The 4 substrates of this enzyme are NADH, NADPH, H^{+}, and quinone, whereas its 3 products are NAD^{+}, NADP^{+}, and hydroquinone.

This enzyme belongs to the family of oxidoreductases, specifically those acting on NADH or NADPH with a quinone or similar compound as acceptor. The systematic name of this enzyme class is NAD(P)H:quinone oxidoreductase. Other names in common use include menadione reductase, phylloquinone reductase, quinone reductase, dehydrogenase, reduced nicotinamide adenine dinucleotide (phosphate,, quinone), DT-diaphorase, flavoprotein NAD(P)H-quinone reductase, menadione oxidoreductase, NAD(P)H dehydrogenase, NAD(P)H menadione reductase, NAD(P)H-quinone dehydrogenase, NAD(P)H-quinone oxidoreductase, NAD(P)H: (quinone-acceptor)oxidoreductase, NAD(P)H: menadione oxidoreductase, NADH-menadione reductase, naphthoquinone reductase, p-benzoquinone reductase, reduced NAD(P)H dehydrogenase, viologen accepting pyridine nucleotide oxidoreductase, vitamin K reductase, diaphorase, reduced nicotinamide-adenine dinucleotide (phosphate) dehydrogenase, vitamin-K reductase, NAD(P)H2 dehydrogenase (quinone), NQO1, QR1, and NAD(P)H:(quinone-acceptor) oxidoreductase. This enzyme participates in biosynthesis of steroids. It employs one cofactor, FAD. At least one compound, Dicumarol is known to inhibit this enzyme.

== Structural studies ==
As of late 2007, only one structure has been solved for this class of enzymes, with the PDB accession code PDB: 2F1O.
