= Oligomycin =

Group of chemical compounds

Oligomycin A
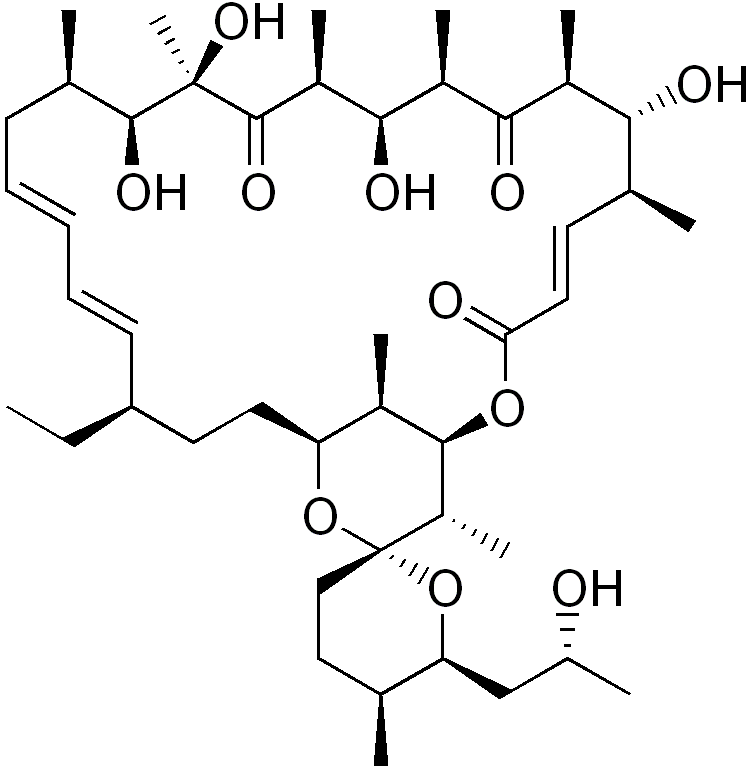

Names
- IUPAC name (1R,4E,5'S,6S,6'S,7R,8S,10R,11R,12S,14R,15S,16R,18E,20E,22R,25S,27R,28S,29R)-22-ethyl-7,11,14,15-tetrahydroxy-6'-[(2R)-2-hydroxypropyl]-5',6,8,10,12,14,16,28,29-nonamethyl-3',4',5',6'-tetrahydro-3H,9H,13H-spiro[2,26-dioxabicyclo[23.3.1]nonacosa-4,18,20-triene-27,2'-pyran]-3,9,13-trione
- Other names Oligomycin

Identifiers
CAS Number	1404-19-9
3D model (JSmol)	Interactive image
ChEBI	CHEBI:28285
ChemSpider	21106358
ECHA InfoCard	100.014.334
EC Number	215-767-9
MeSH	Oligomycins
PubChem CID	6450197
RTECS number	RK3325000
UNII	14JVM0OHLV
CompTox Dashboard (EPA)	DTXSID7040570
- InChI: InChI=1S/C46H76O11/c1-13-34-18-16-14-15-17-28(4)42(51)45(12,54)43(52)32(8)40(50)31(7)39(49)30(6)38(48)27(3)19-22-37(47)55-41-29(5)35(21-20-34)56-46(33(41)9)24-23-26(2)36(57-46)25-44(10,11)53/h14-16,18-19,22,26-36,38,40-42,48,50-51,53-54H,13,17,20-21,23-25H2,1-12H3/b15-14+,18-16-,22-19+/t26-,27-,28+,29+,30+,31-,32-,33-,34+,35?,36-,38-,40+,41+,42+,45+,46-/m1/s1 Key: QBAMBSAJEFIQBK-GJHUHQBXSA-N; InChI=1S/C46H76O11/c1-13-34-18-16-14-15-17-28(4)42(51)45(12,54)43(52)32(8)40(50)31(7)39(49)30(6)38(48)27(3)19-22-37(47)55-41-29(5)35(21-20-34)56-46(33(41)9)24-23-26(2)36(57-46)25-44(10,11)53/h14-16,18-19,22,26-36,38,40-42,48,50-51,53-54H,13,17,20-21,23-25H2,1-12H3/b15-14+,18-16-,22-19+/t26-,27-,28+,29+,30+,31-,32-,33-,34+,35?,36-,38-,40+,41+,42+,45+,46-/m1/s1 Key: QBAMBSAJEFIQBK-GJHUHQBXBC; Key: QBAMBSAJEFIQBK-GJHUHQBXSA-N
- SMILES: C[C@](C)(O)C[C@H]1O[C@@]2(CC[C@H]1C)O[C@H]3CC[C@@H](CC)/C=C\C=C\C[C@H](C)[C@H](O)[C@](C)(O)C(=O)[C@H](C)[C@@H](O)[C@H](C)C(=O)[C@@H](C)[C@H](O)[C@H](C)/C=C/C(=O)O[C@H]([C@H]2C)[C@H]3C

Properties
Chemical formula	C_{45}H_{74}O_{11}
Molar mass	791.062 g/mol

Hazards
Safety data sheet (SDS)	MSDS at Fermentek
- Except where otherwise noted, data are given for materials in their standard state (at 25 °C [77 °F], 100 kPa). verify (what is ?) Infobox references

Oligomycins are macrolides created by Streptomyces that are strong antibacterial agents but are often poisonous to other organisms, including humans.

== Function ==
Oligomycins have use as antibiotics. However, in humans, they have limited or no clinical use due to their toxic effects on mitochondria and ATP synthase.

Oligomycin A is an inhibitor of ATP synthase. In oxidative phosphorylation research, it is used to prevent stage 3 (phosphorylating) respiration. Oligomycin A inhibits ATP synthase by blocking its proton channel (F_{O} subunit), which is necessary for oxidative phosphorylation of ADP to ATP (energy production). The inhibition of ATP synthesis by oligomycin A will significantly reduce electron flow through the electron transport chain; however, electron flow is not stopped completely due to a process known as proton leak or mitochondrial uncoupling. This process is due to facilitated diffusion of protons into the mitochondrial matrix through an uncoupling protein such as thermogenin, or UCP1.

Administering oligomycin to rats can result in very high levels of lactate accumulating in the blood and urine.

Oligomycins
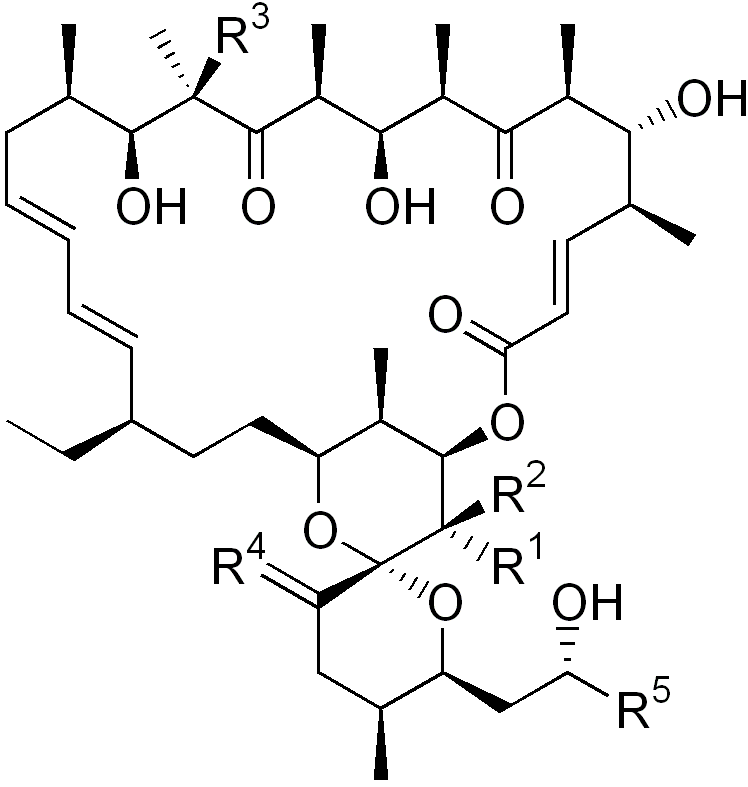
	R^{1}	R^{2}	R^{3}	R^{4}	R^{5}
Oligomycin A	CH_{3}	H	OH	H,H	CH_{3}
Oligomycin B	CH_{3}	H	OH	O	CH_{3}
Oligomycin C	CH_{3}	H	H	H,H	CH_{3}
Oligomycin D (Rutamycin A)	H	H	OH	H,H	CH_{3}
Oligomycin E	CH_{3}	OH	OH	O	CH_{3}
Oligomycin F	CH_{3}	H	OH	H,H	CH_{2}CH_{3}
Rutamycin B	H	H	H	H,H	CH_{3}
44-Homooligomycin A	CH_{2}CH_{3}	H	OH	H,H	CH_{3}
44-Homooligomycin B	CH_{2}CH_{3}	H	OH	O	CH_{3}
