= Iron—cytochrome-c reductase =

iron—cytochrome-c reductase

Identifiers
- EC no.: 1.9.98.1
- CAS no.: 37256-52-3

Databases
- IntEnz: IntEnz view
- BRENDA: BRENDA entry
- ExPASy: NiceZyme view
- KEGG: KEGG entry
- MetaCyc: metabolic pathway
- PRIAM: profile
- PDB structures: RCSB PDB PDBe PDBsum
- Gene Ontology: AmiGO / QuickGO
Search
- PMC: articles
- PubMed: articles
- NCBI: proteins

In enzymology, an iron—cytochrome-c reductase (created 1972 as EC 1.9.99.1, transferred 2014 to EC 1.9.98.1) is an enzyme that catalyzes the chemical reaction

ferrocytochrome c + Fe^{3+} $\rightleftharpoons$ ferricytochrome c + Fe^{2+}

Thus, the two substrates of this enzyme are ferrocytochrome c and Fe^{3+}, whereas its two products are ferricytochrome c and Fe^{2+}.

== Classification ==
This enzyme belongs to the family of oxidoreductases, specifically those acting on a heme group of donors with other acceptors.

== Nomenclature ==
The systematic name of this enzyme class is ferrocytochrome-c:Fe^{3+} oxidoreductase. This enzyme is also called iron-cytochrome c reductase.

== Structure and function ==
This enzyme is part of the electron transport system of Ferrobacillus ferrooxidans. It employs one cofactor, iron.
