= Ubiquinol oxidase =

Identifiers
- EC no.: 1.10.3.11

Databases
- IntEnz: IntEnz view
- BRENDA: BRENDA entry
- ExPASy: NiceZyme view
- KEGG: KEGG entry
- MetaCyc: metabolic pathway
- PRIAM: profile
- PDB structures: RCSB PDB PDBe PDBsum
Search
- PMC: articles
- PubMed: articles
- NCBI: proteins

Ubiquinol oxidases (EC 1.10.3.11) are enzymes in the bacterial electron transport chain that oxidise ubiquinol into ubiquinone and reduce oxygen to water. These enzymes are one set of the many alternative terminal oxidases in the branched prokaryotic electron transport chain. The overall structure of the E. coli ubiquinol oxidase is similar to that of the mammalian Cytochrome c oxidase, with the addition of a polar ubiquinol-binding site embedded in the membrane.

== See also ==
- Oxidative phosphorylation
- Microbial metabolism
