= ATP5PF =

Protein-coding gene in the species Homo sapiens

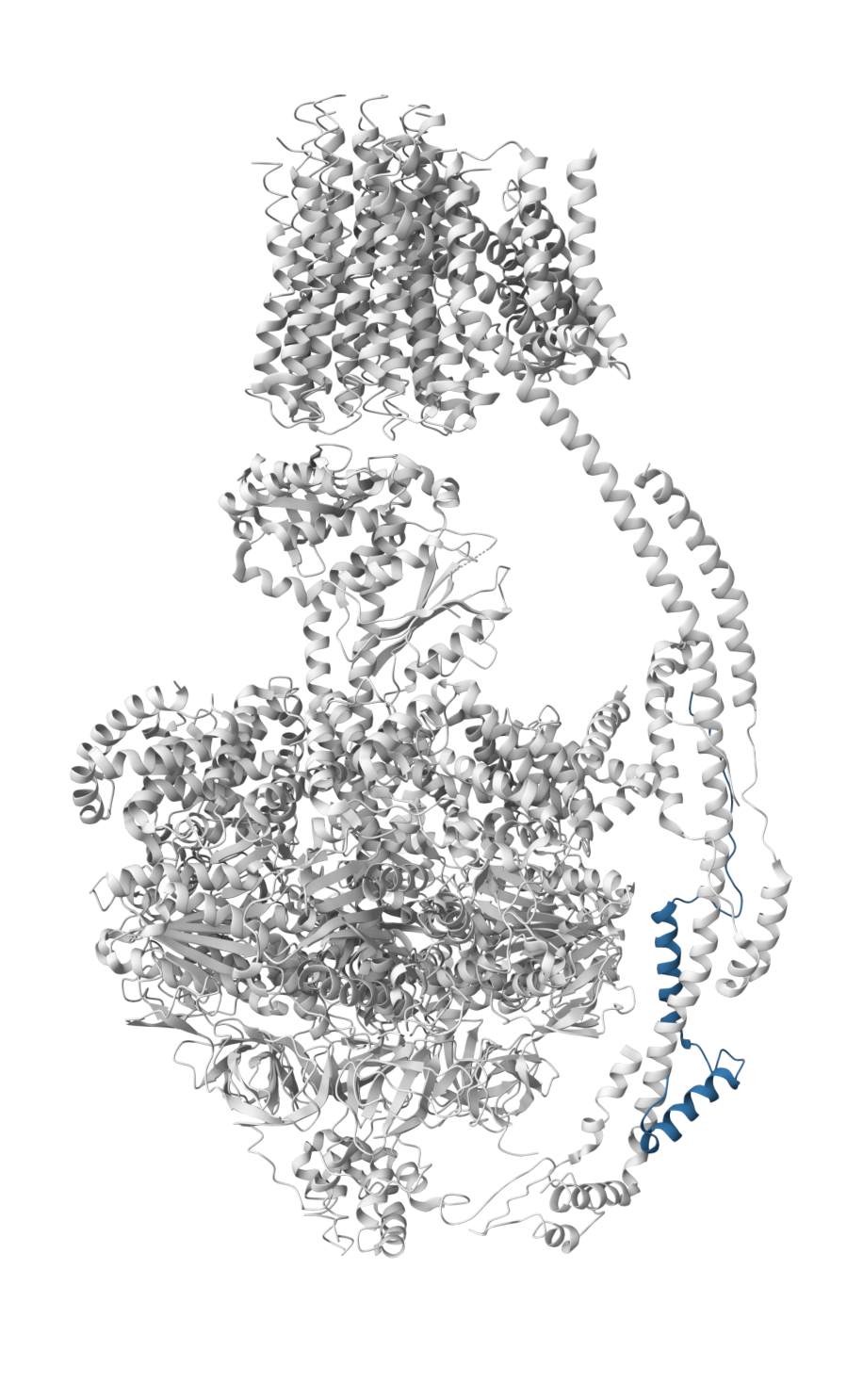

Identifiers
- Aliases: ATP5PF, ATP5, ATP5A, ATPM, CF6, F6, ATP synthase, H+ transporting, mitochondrial Fo complex subunit F6, ATP synthase peripheral stalk subunit F6, ATP5J
- External IDs: OMIM: 603152; MGI: 107777; GeneCards: ATP5PF

Gene location (Human)
Chr.	Chromosome 21 (human)
Band	21q21.3	Start	25,716,503 bp
Band	21q21.3	End	25,735,673 bp

Gene location (Mouse)
Chr.	Chromosome 16 (mouse)
Band	16|16 C3.3	Start	84,624,754 bp
Band	16|16 C3.3	End	84,632,513 bp
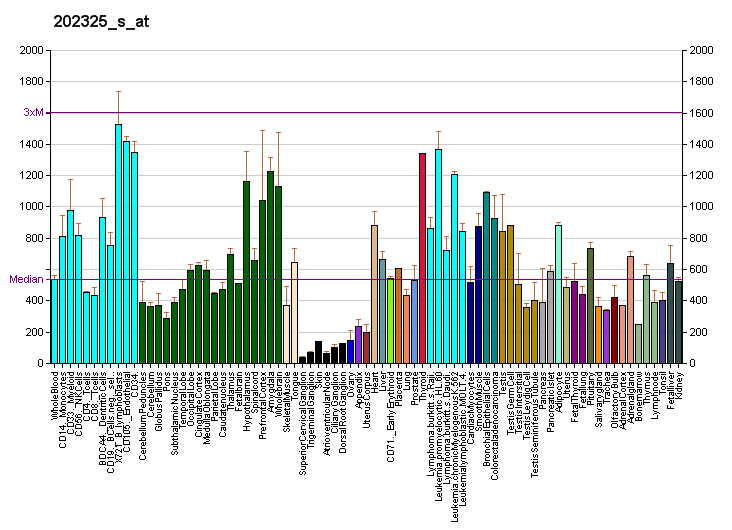
RNA expression pattern
Bgee	Human / Mouse (ortholog); Top expressed in: myocardium of left ventricle; right ventricle; Epithelium of choroid plexus; cardiac muscle tissue of right atrium; biceps brachii; Skeletal muscle tissue of rectus abdominis; body of tongue; vena cava; Skeletal muscle tissue of biceps brachii; vastus lateralis muscle / Top expressed in: right kidney; digastric muscle; saccule; myocardium of ventricle; thoracic diaphragm; atrioventricular valve; cardiac muscles; facial motor nucleus; triceps brachii muscle; muscle of thigh; More reference expression data
BioGPS	More reference expression data
Gene ontology
Molecular function	transporter activity; proton transmembrane transporter activity; transmembrane transporter activity; ATPase activity; protein-containing complex binding
Cellular component	mitochondrial proton-transporting ATP synthase complex, coupling factor F(o); proton-transporting ATP synthase complex, coupling factor F(o); membrane; mitochondrial proton-transporting ATP synthase complex; mitochondrial inner membrane; mitochondrion; extracellular space; cell surface
Biological process	ATP synthesis coupled proton transport; ion transport; substantia nigra development; ATP metabolic process; mitochondrial ATP synthesis coupled proton transport; ATP biosynthetic process; cristae formation; transport; positive regulation of heart rate; response to muscle activity; negative regulation of prostaglandin secretion; positive regulation of blood pressure; negative regulation of arachidonic acid secretion
Sources:Amigo / QuickGO
Orthologs
Databases	NCBI: entry; OMA: entry
Species	Human	Mouse
Entrez	522	11957
Ensembl	ENSG00000154723	ENSMUSG00000022890
UniProt	P18859	P97450
RefSeq (mRNA)	NM_001003696; NM_001003697; NM_001003701; NM_001003703; NM_001685 NM_001320266; NM_001320267	NM_016755; NM_001302213; NM_001302214; NM_001302215; NM_001302216 NM_001358499; NM_001358500
RefSeq (protein)	NP_001003696; NP_001003697; NP_001003701; NP_001003703; NP_001307195 NP_001307196; NP_001676	NP_001289142; NP_001289143; NP_001289144; NP_001289145; NP_058035 NP_001345428; NP_001345429
Location (UCSC)	Chr 21: 25.72 – 25.74 Mb	Chr 16: 84.62 – 84.63 Mb
PubMed search
- Wikidata
View/Edit Human	View/Edit Mouse

Mitochondrial ATP synthase coupling factor 6 (F6)
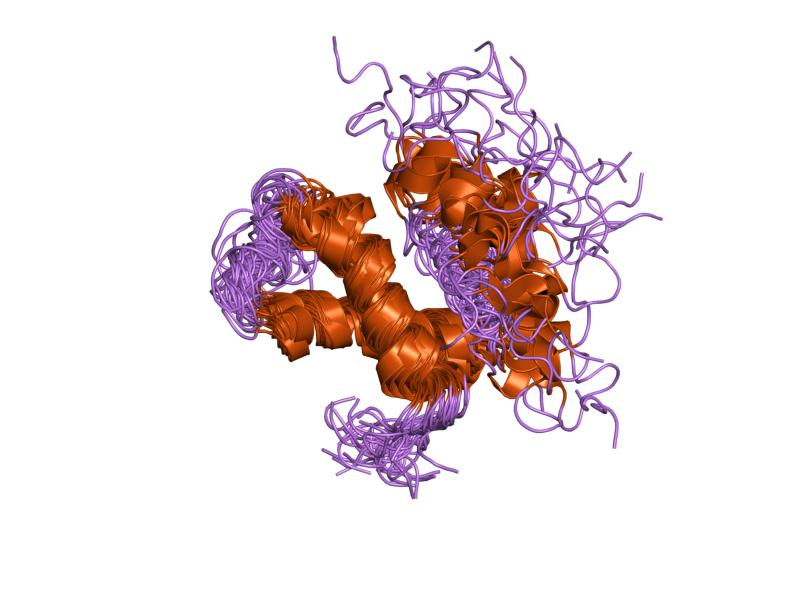
- solution structure of subunit f6 from the peripheral stalk region of atp synthase from bovine heart mitochondria

Identifiers
- Symbol: ATP-synt_F6
- Pfam: PF05511
- InterPro: IPR008387
Available protein structures:
- PDB: IPR008387 PF05511 (ECOD; PDBsum)
- AlphaFold: IPR008387; PF05511

ATP synthase peripheral stalk subunit F6, mitochondrial is an enzyme subunit that in humans is encoded by the ATP5PF gene.

== Function ==
Mitochondrial ATP synthase catalyzes ATP synthesis, utilizing an electrochemical gradient of protons across the inner membrane during oxidative phosphorylation. It is composed of two linked multi-subunit complexes: the soluble catalytic core, F_{1}, and the membrane-spanning component, F_{O}, which comprises the proton channel. The F_{1} complex consists of 5 different subunits (alpha, beta, gamma, delta, and epsilon) assembled in a ratio of 3 alpha, 3 beta, and a single representative of the other 3. The F_{O} seems to have nine subunits (a, b, c, d, e, f, g, F6 and 8). This gene encodes the F6 subunit of the F_{O} complex, required for F_{1} and F_{O} interactions. Alternatively spliced transcript variants encoding different isoforms have been identified for this gene.

The F6 subunit is part of the peripheral stalk that links the F_{1} and F_{O} complexes together, and which acts as a stator to prevent certain subunits from rotating with the central rotary element. The peripheral stalk differs in subunit composition between mitochondrial, chloroplast and bacterial F-ATPases. In mitochondria, the peripheral stalk is composed of one copy each of subunits OSCP (oligomycin sensitivity conferral protein), F6, b and d. There is no homologue of subunit F6 in bacterial or chloroplast F-ATPase, whose peripheral stalks are composed of one copy of the delta subunit (homologous to OSCP), and two copies of subunit b in bacteria, or one copy each of subunits b and b' in chloroplasts and photosynthetic bacteria.
