= Orenia chitinitropha =

Scientific classification
- Domain: Bacteria
- Kingdom: Bacillati
- Phylum: Bacillota
- Class: Clostridia
- Order: Halanaerobiales
- Family: Halobacteroidaceae
- Genus: Orenia
- Species: O. chitinitropha

Binomial name
- Orenia chitinitropha Sorokin and Kolganova 2014

Type strain
- HCh-An1

Species of bacterium

Orenia chitinitropha is a bacterium from the genus Orenia which has been isolated from anoxic sediments from a hypersaline lake from the Kulunda Steppe.
