= Halanaerobium hydrogeniformans =

Scientific classification
- Domain: Bacteria
- Kingdom: Bacillati
- Phylum: Bacillota
- Class: Clostridia
- Order: Halanaerobiales
- Family: Halanaerobiaceae
- Genus: Halanaerobium
- Species: H. hydrogeniformans

Binomial name
- Halanaerobium hydrogeniformans Brown et al. 2011

Species of bacterium

Halanaerobium hydrogeniformans is an alkaliphilic bacterium that is capable of biohydrogen production at (pH 11 and 7% (w/v) sodium chloride (NaCl) salts) and 33 °C (91 °F); it is commonly found in haloalkaline lakes.

Halanaerobium hydrogeniformans was first discovered by Melanie Mormile, professor of biological sciences at Missouri University of Science and Technology and her team, from Soap Lake, Washington.

== Microbiology ==
Halanaerobium hydrogeniformans is an obligately anaerobic, Gram-negative, non-motile, non-sporulating, elongated rod bacterium, which can tolerate the extreme conditions of both high salinity and alkalinity of its environment, and which has optimal growth at pH 11 and 7% NaCl. It can ferment a variety of 5- and 6-carbon sugars derived from cellulose and hemicelluloses, including cellobiose, and forms the end products hydrogen, acetate, and formate.

== Genome structure ==
The Halanaerobium hydrogeniformans genome sequence was determined through a combination of Illumina and 454 technologies. The total genome size is 2,613,116 bp. The genome is 33.1% G+C and contains 2,295 candidate protein-encoding gene models. The genome contains four separate ribosomal RNA (rRNA) operons, each containing a 5S, a 16S, and a 23S rRNA gene, with 99.9 to 100% identity between 16S rRNA genes.

== Applications ==
As the price of fossil fuels increases and reserves diminish, biofuel production is seen as a viable contribution to current and future energy demands. Halanaerobium hydrogeniformans can use several pure sugars for hydrogen production. Hence, this bacterium can potentially increase the efficiency and efficacy of biohydrogen production from renewable biomass resources.
