= Orenia marismortui =

Scientific classification
- Domain: Bacteria
- Kingdom: Bacillati
- Phylum: Bacillota
- Class: Clostridia
- Order: Halanaerobiales
- Family: Halobacteroidaceae
- Genus: Orenia
- Species: O. marismortui

Binomial name
- Orenia marismortui (Oren et al. 1988) Rainey et al. 1995

Synonyms
- Sporohalobacter marismortui

Species of bacterium

Orenia marismortui is a Gram-negative, spore-forming, rod-shaped, anaerobic and motile bacterium from the genus Orenia which has been isolated from sediments from the shore of the Dead Sea.
