= Halanaerobium sehlinense =

Scientific classification
- Domain: Bacteria
- Kingdom: Bacillati
- Phylum: Bacillota
- Class: Clostridia
- Order: Halanaerobiales
- Family: Halanaerobiaceae
- Genus: Halanaerobium
- Species: H. sehlinense

Binomial name
- Halanaerobium sehlinense Abdeljabbar et al. 2013

Type strain
- 1Sehel

Species of bacterium

Halanaerobium sehlinense is a Gram-negative, strictly anaerobic, extremely halophilic, rod-shaped, non-spore-forming and non-motile bacterium from the genus Halanaerobium which has been isolated from sediments from the Sahline Sebkha in Tunisia.
