= Halanaerobacter jeridensis =

Scientific classification
- Domain: Bacteria
- Kingdom: Bacillati
- Phylum: Bacillota
- Class: Clostridia
- Order: Halanaerobiales
- Family: Halobacteroidaceae
- Genus: Halanaerobacter
- Species: H. jeridensis

Binomial name
- Halanaerobacter jeridensis Mezghani et al. 2012

Type strain
- CEJFG43

Synonyms
- Halanaerobacter jeridense

Species of bacterium

Halanaerobacter jeridensis is an obligatory anaerobic and moderately halophilic bacterium from the genus Halanaerobacter which has been isolated from the Jerid lake in Tunisia.
