= Halanaerobium salsuginis =

Scientific classification
- Domain: Bacteria
- Kingdom: Bacillati
- Phylum: Bacillota
- Class: Clostridia
- Order: Halanaerobiales
- Family: Halanaerobiaceae
- Genus: Halanaerobium
- Species: H. salsuginis

Binomial name
- Halanaerobium salsuginis Bhupathiraju et al. 1994

Type strain
- VS-752

Synonyms
- Haloanaerobium salsuginis Haloanaerobium salsugo

Species of bacterium

Halanaerobium salsuginis is a strictly anaerobic, Gram-negative, moderately halophilic, non-spore-forming and non-motile bacterium from the genus Halanaerobium.
