= Halanaerobium fermentans =

Scientific classification
- Domain: Bacteria
- Kingdom: Bacillati
- Phylum: Bacillota
- Class: Clostridia
- Order: Halanaerobiales
- Family: Halanaerobiaceae
- Genus: Halanaerobium
- Species: H. fermentans

Binomial name
- Halanaerobium fermentans Kobayashi et al. 2000

Synonyms
- Haloanaerobium fermentans Haloanaerobium fermentum

Species of bacterium

Halanaerobium fermentans is a Gram-negative and strictly anaerobic bacterium from the genus Halanaerobium which has been isolated from puffer fish ovaries.
