= ATP5F1D =

Protein-coding gene in the species Homo sapiens

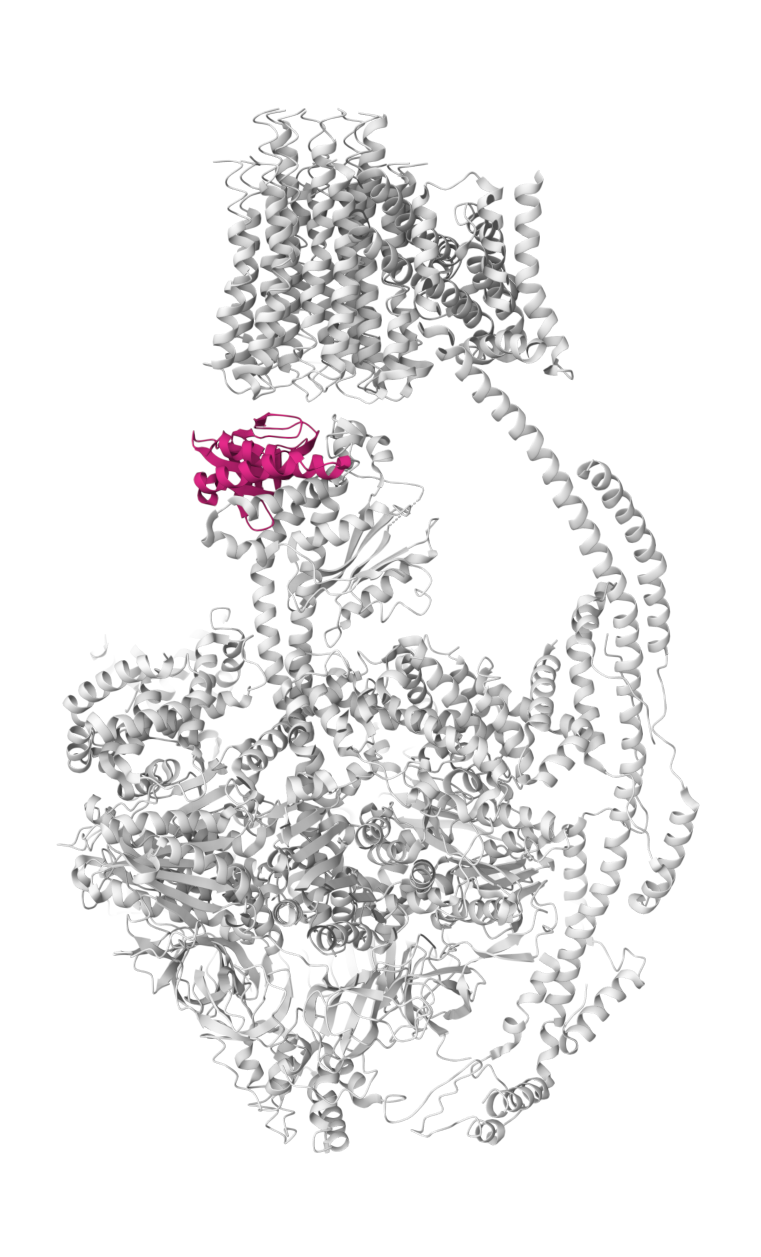

Identifiers
- Aliases: ATP5F1D, ATP synthase, H+ transporting, mitochondrial F1 complex, delta subunit, ATP synthase F1 subunit delta, ATP5D, MC5DN5
- External IDs: OMIM: 603150; MGI: 1913293; GeneCards: ATP5F1D

Gene location (Human)
Chr.	Chromosome 19 (human)
Band	19p13.3	Start	1,241,746 bp
Band	19p13.3	End	1,244,825 bp

Gene location (Mouse)
Chr.	Chromosome 10 (mouse)
Band	10|10 C1	Start	80,138,632 bp
Band	10|10 C1	End	80,145,818 bp
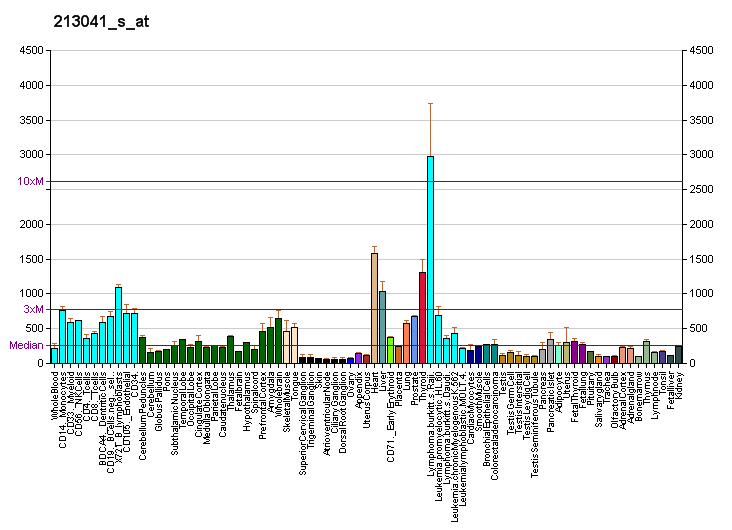

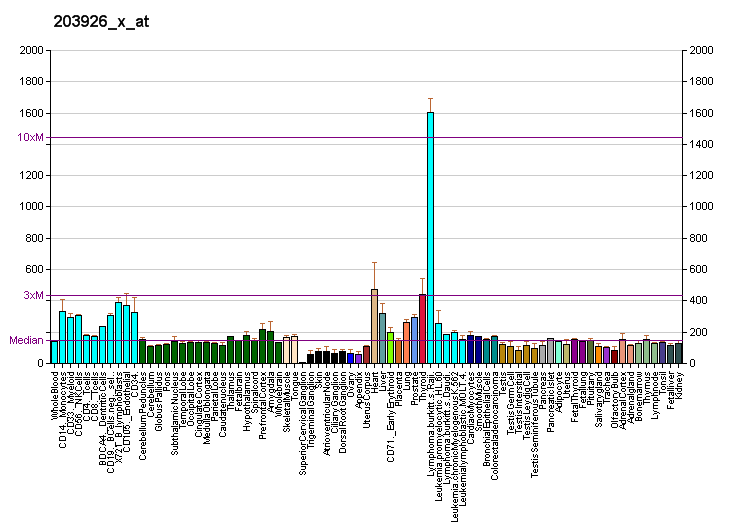
RNA expression pattern
Bgee	Human / Mouse (ortholog); Top expressed in: apex of heart; muscle of thigh; mucosa of transverse colon; right auricle of heart; gastrocnemius muscle; left ventricle; right frontal lobe; right lobe of liver; body of pancreas; body of stomach / Top expressed in: right ventricle; extraocular muscle; ankle; right kidney; vestibular membrane of cochlear duct; condyle; digastric muscle; fossa; facial motor nucleus; sternocleidomastoid muscle; More reference expression data
BioGPS	More reference expression data
Gene ontology
Molecular function	proton-transporting ATP synthase activity, rotational mechanism; transmembrane transporter activity; transporter activity; ADP binding; ATP binding; ATPase activity
Cellular component	mitochondrial proton-transporting ATP synthase complex; membrane; mitochondrial matrix; mitochondrion; mitochondrial proton-transporting ATP synthase complex, catalytic sector F(1); mitochondrial inner membrane; proton-transporting ATP synthase complex, catalytic core F(1)
Biological process	response to copper ion; mitochondrial ATP synthesis coupled proton transport; ion transport; oxidative phosphorylation; ATP synthesis coupled proton transport; ATP biosynthetic process; cristae formation; aerobic dissimilation; mitochondrial proton-transporting ATP synthase complex assembly
Sources:Amigo / QuickGO
Orthologs
Databases	NCBI: entry; OMA: entry
Species	Human	Mouse
Entrez	513	66043
Ensembl	ENSG00000099624	ENSMUSG00000003072
UniProt	P30049	Q9D3D9
RefSeq (mRNA)	NM_001687; NM_001001975	NM_025313; NM_001347092
RefSeq (protein)	NP_001001975; NP_001678	NP_001334021; NP_079589
Location (UCSC)	Chr 19: 1.24 – 1.24 Mb	Chr 10: 80.14 – 80.15 Mb
PubMed search
- Wikidata
View/Edit Human	View/Edit Mouse

ATP synthase subunit delta, mitochondrial, also known as ATP synthase F1 subunit delta or F-ATPase delta subunit, is an enzyme that in humans is encoded by the ATP5F1D (formerly ATP5D) gene. This gene encodes a subunit of mitochondrial ATP synthase. Mitochondrial ATP synthase catalyzes ATP synthesis, utilizing an electrochemical gradient of protons across the inner membrane during oxidative phosphorylation.

== Structure ==
The ATP5F1D gene is located on the p arm of chromosome 19 at position 13.3 and it spans 3,075 base pairs. The ATP5F1D gene produces a 17.5 kDa protein composed of 168 amino acids. The coded protein is a subunit of the mitochondrial ATP synthase (Complex V), which is composed of two linked multi-subunit complexes: the soluble catalytic core, F_{1}, and the membrane-spanning component, F_{o}, comprising the proton channel. The catalytic portion of mitochondrial ATP synthase consists of 5 different subunits (alpha, beta, gamma, delta, and epsilon) assembled with a stoichiometry of 3 alpha, 3 beta, and a single representative of the other 3. The proton channel consists of three main subunits (a, b, c). This gene encodes the delta subunit of the catalytic core. Alternatively spliced transcript variants encoding the same isoform have been identified. The structure of the protein has been known to resemble a 'lollipop' structure due to the attachment of the F1 catalytic unit to the mitochondrial inner membrane by the F0 unit.

== Function ==
This gene encodes a subunit of the mitochondrial ATP synthase (Complex V) of the mitochondrial respiratory chain, which is necessary for the catalysis of ATP synthesis. Utilizing an electrochemical gradient of protons produced by electron transport complexes of the respiratory chain, the synthase converts ADP into ATP across the inner membrane during oxidative phosphorylation. F-type ATPases consist of two structural domains, F1 and F0, that contribute to catalysis. The F1 domain contains an extramembranous catalytic core and the F0 domain contains the membrane proton channel linked by a central and a peripheral stalk. During catalysis, ATP turnover in the catalytic domain of F1 is coupled by a rotary mechanism of the central stalk subunits to proton transport. The encoded protein is a part of the complex F1 domain and of the central stalk which is part of the complex rotary element. Rotation of the central stalk against the surrounding alpha3beta3 subunits leads to the hydrolysis of ATP in three separate catalytic sites on the beta subunits.

== Clinical significance ==
Mutations of ATP5F1D have been associated with childhood mitochondrial disorders with phenotypes such as episodic decompensations, lactic acidosis, and hyperammonemia accompanied by ketoacidosis or hypoglycemia. Biallelic mutations of c.245C>T and c.317T>G in ATP5F1D were shown to cause a metabolic disorder with such phenotypes due to mitochondrial dysfunction in two unrelated individuals. Mutations of ATP5F1D with decreased expression of the protein have also been found to result in synaptic dysfunction of the mitochondria that could play an essential role in amyotrophic lateral sclerosis (ALS) pathogenesis.

== Interactions ==
Among the two components, CF1 - the catalytic core - and CF0 - the membrane proton channel of the F-type ATPase, ATP5F1D is associated with the catalytic core. The catalytic core is composed of five different subunits including alpha, beta, gamma, delta, and epsilon subunits. The protein has additional interactions with ATP5ME, ATP5PO, PUS1, NDUFB5, GTPBP6, ATP5MG, ATP5PF and others.
