= Surströmming =

Swedish fermented Baltic Sea herring

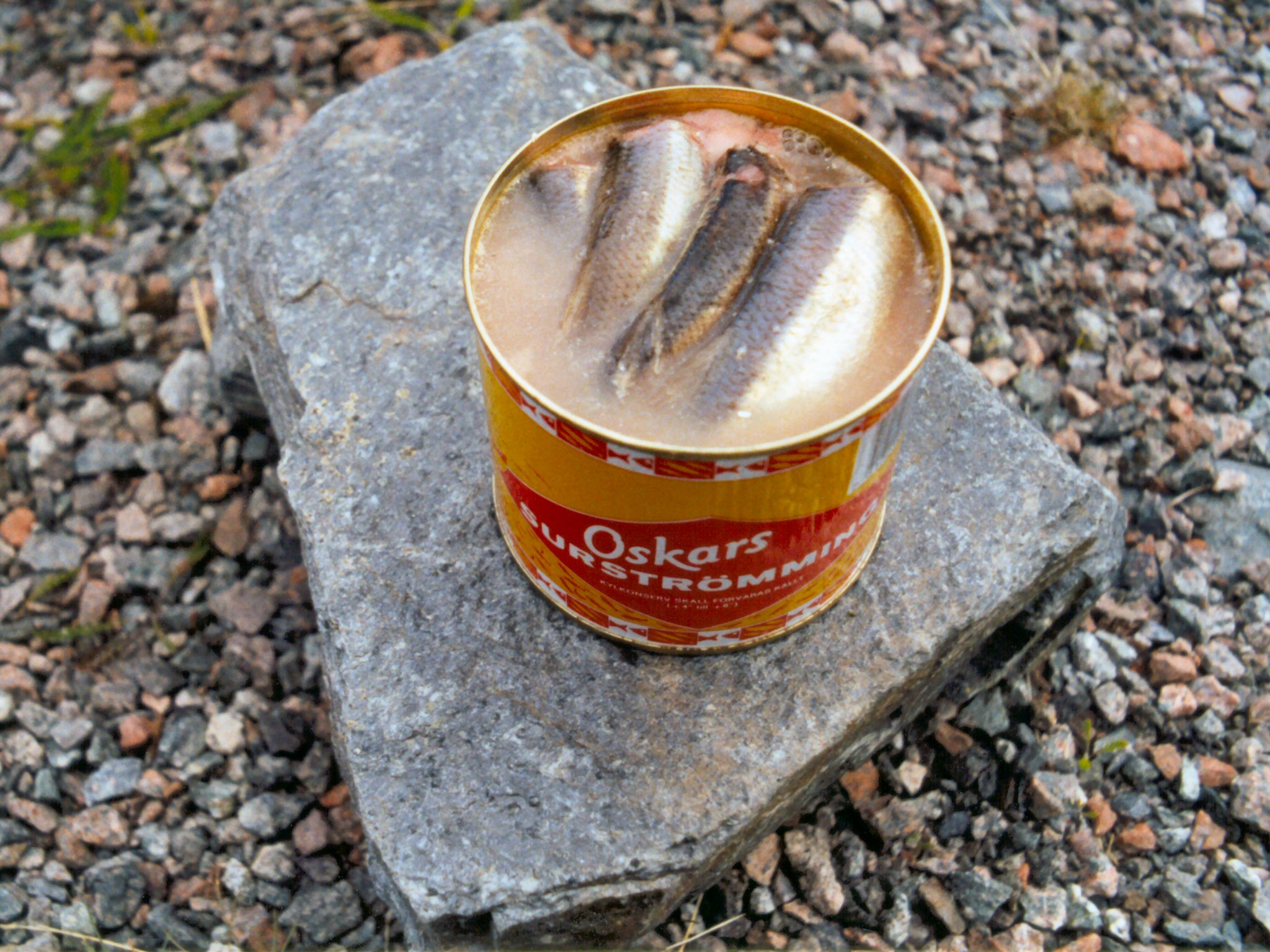
- Opened can of surströmming in brine
- Alternative names: Fermented herring
- Type: Fermented fish
- Place of origin: Sweden
- Region or state: Norrland
- Invented: 16th century or earlier
- Serving temperature: Cold
- Main ingredients: Baltic herring; Water; Salt
- Other information: Annual premiere the third Thursday in August.

Surströmming (pronounced [ˈsʉ̂ːˌʂʈrœmːɪŋ]; Swedish for 'sour herring') is a lightly salted, fermented Baltic Sea herring traditional to Swedish cuisine since at least the 16th century. It is distinct from fried or pickled herring.

The Baltic herring, known as strömming in Swedish, is smaller than the Atlantic herring found in the North Sea. Traditionally, strömming is defined as herring caught in the brackish waters of the Baltic north of the Kalmar Strait. The herring used for surströmming are caught prior to spawning in April and May.

During the production of surströmming, just enough salt is used to prevent the raw herring from rotting while allowing it to ferment. A fermentation process of at least six months gives the fish its characteristic strong smell and somewhat acidic taste. Surströmming has one of the most putrid food smells in the world, even stronger than similarly fermented fish dishes such as the Korean hongeo-hoe, the Japanese kusaya or the Icelandic hákarl, making surströmming an acquired taste.

At the end of the 1940s, surströmming producers in Sweden lobbied for a royal ordinance (Swedish: förordning) that would prevent incompletely fermented fish from being sold. The decree that was issued forbade sales of the current year's production in Sweden prior to the third Thursday in August. While the ordinance is no longer in force, retailers still maintain the date for the "premiere" of that year's catch.

== Origin ==
Surströmming has been part of northern Swedish cuisine since at least the 16th century.

Fermented fish is a traditional staple in European cuisines. The oldest archeological finds of fish fermentation are 9,200 years old and originate from the south of today's Sweden. More recent examples include garum, a fermented fish sauce made by the ancient Greeks and Romans, and Worcestershire sauce, which also contains fermented fish.

Preservation of fish through fermentation in weak brine may have developed when brining was still expensive due to the cost of salt. In modern times, the fish are initially marinated in a strong brine solution that draws out the blood, then fermented in a weaker brine in barrels prior to canning.

The canning procedure, introduced in the 19th century, enabled the product to be marketed in shops and stored at home, whereas formerly the final stage would have been stored in large wooden barrels and smaller, one-litre kegs. Canning also enabled the product to be marketed farther south in Sweden.

== Chemical process ==
Fermentation occurs through autolysis and starts from a lactic acid enzyme in the spine of the fish. Together with bacteria, pungent smelling acids are formed, such as propionic acid, butyric acid and acetic acid. Hydrogen sulfide is also produced. The salt raises the osmotic pressure of the brine above the zone where bacteria responsible for rotting can thrive and prevents decomposition of proteins into oligopeptides and amino acids. Instead, the osmotic conditions enable Halanaerobium bacteria such as H. praevalens to thrive and decompose the fish glycogen into organic acids, making it sour (acidic).

== Production and market ==
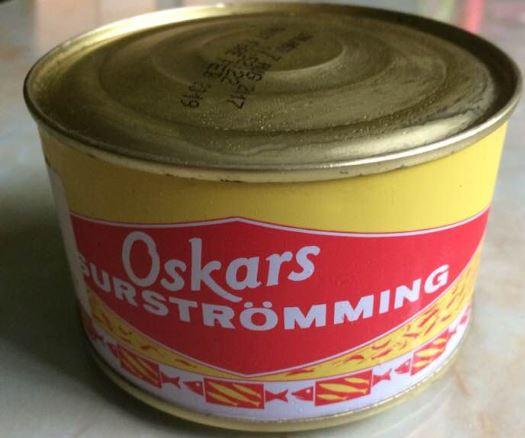
A can of surströmming, with the top noticeably bulging due to fermented gases being released

The herring are caught in May and June, when they are in prime condition and about to spawn, and have not yet fattened. They are put into a strong brine for about 20 hours that draws out the blood, after which the heads and innards are removed and the fish is put into a weaker brine solution. The barrels are placed in a temperature-controlled room kept at 15–18 °C (59–64 °F). Canning takes place at the beginning of July and for three to four weeks thereafter. Ten days prior to the premiere the final product is distributed to wholesalers. The fermentation of the fish relies on a lactic acid enzyme in the spine that is activated if the conditions, temperature and brine concentration, are right. The low temperature in Northern Sweden is one of the elements that contribute to the character of the final product.

Prior to the development of modern canning methods, surströmming was sold in wooden barrels for immediate consumption, as even the smaller kegs could leak.

Fermentation continues in the can, causing it to bulge noticeably, which would usually be a sign of botulism or other food poisoning concern in non-fermented canned foods. Species of Halanaerobium bacteria are responsible for the in-can ripening. These bacteria produce carbon dioxide and a number of compounds that account for the unique odor: pungent (propionic acid), rotten-egg (hydrogen sulfide), rancid-butter (butyric acid), and vinegary (acetic acid). Due to these gases, a thousand cans of surströmming exploded over a period of six hours during a fire at a Swedish warehouse in 2014.

Surströmming is commonly sold in grocery stores all over Sweden. According to the Surströmming Academy's statistics from 2009, about 2 million people eat surströmming annually. Sweden's export of surströmming is only 0.2 percent of all produced surströmming.

Many people do not care for surströmming. As with the Nordic dried-fish dish lutefisk, it is a food that meets strong reactions. It is more popular in northern Sweden than in other parts of the country.

As of 2023, over the past few years, the supply of Baltic and other herring caught by Swedish fishermen has dramatically declined. Baltic herring fisheries have been used unsustainably since the Middle Ages, and overfishing is pushing populations to the brink of collapse. With such low catch numbers, retailers are now selling out their entire supply within minutes of the annual surströmming release.

== Preparation ==
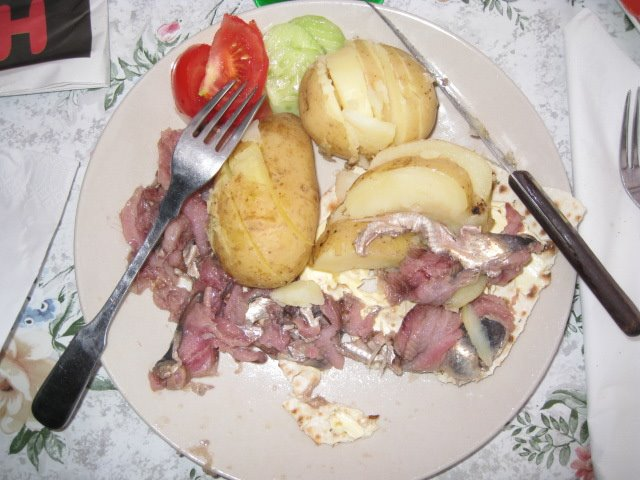
Surströmming served on tunnbröd (a Swedish flatbread) with boiled potatoes and vegetables

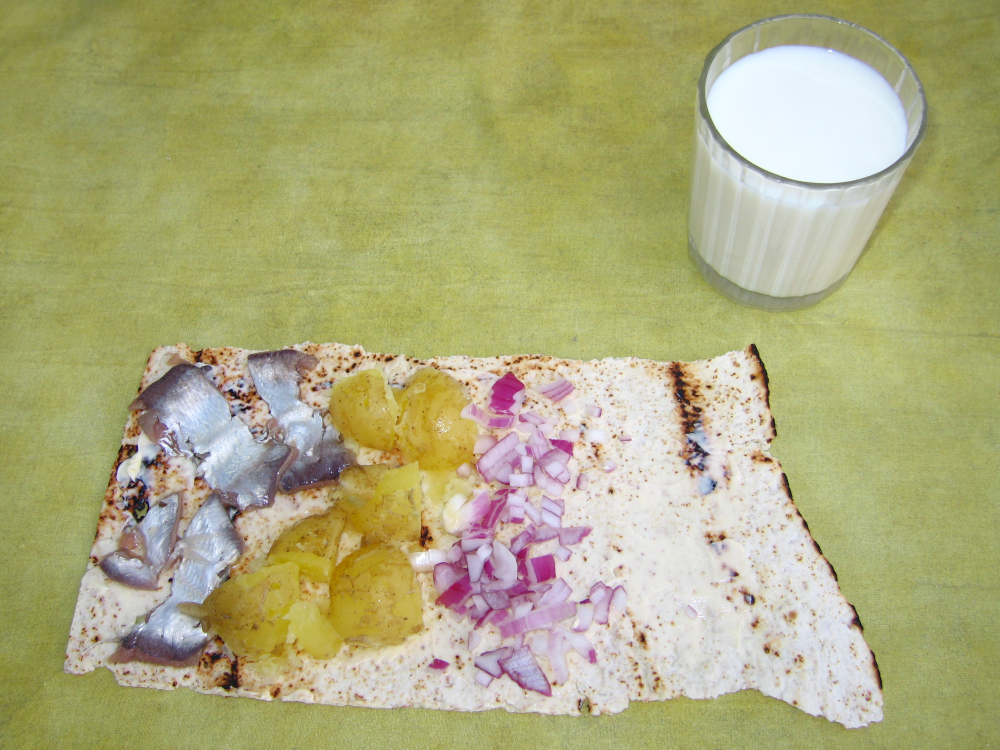
Surströmming with potatoes and onion on buttered tunnbröd, served with a glass of milk

Swedes usually consume surströmming after the third Thursday of August, labeled as "Surströmming day", through early September. Because of the strong smell, it is often eaten outdoors. The pressurized can is usually opened some distance away from the dining table and is often initially punctured while immersed in a bucket of water, or after tapping and angling it upwards at 45 degrees, to prevent escaping gas from spraying brine.

Surströmming comes both ungutted with only the heads removed and as fillets. With the former, the fish is gutted prior to eating, and the backbone and sometimes the skin are removed. The roe is commonly eaten along with the fish.

Surströmming is often eaten with tunnbröd, either soft or a crispy type of flatbread made of different kinds of flour; sometimes it also contains milk and bread spices. Crispy tunnbröd has a bubbly texture and is more brittle than typical crispbread made of rye. The use of tunnbröd originated in the High Coast area, where the tradition is to make a sandwich (known as a surströmmingsklämma) with two pieces of buttered hard tunnbröd. In addition to the fish, the two most common toppings are potatoes (either sliced or mashed, often almond potatoes) and finely diced red onion. Surströmming is also commonly eaten without bread, with potatoes and red onion. To counterbalance the strong flavour of the fish, Västerbotten cheese is sometimes added.

In the southern part of Sweden, it is customary to use a variety of condiments such as diced red onion, gräddfil (fat fermented sour cream similar to smetana) or crème fraîche, chives, and sometimes tomato and chopped dill.

Surströmming is commonly served with snaps, light beers like pilsner or lager, svagdricka (a type of small beer), water, or cold milk. What to drink with surströmming is disputed among connoisseurs. Surströmming is usually served as the focus of a traditional festivity called a surströmmingsskiva.

== International opinion ==
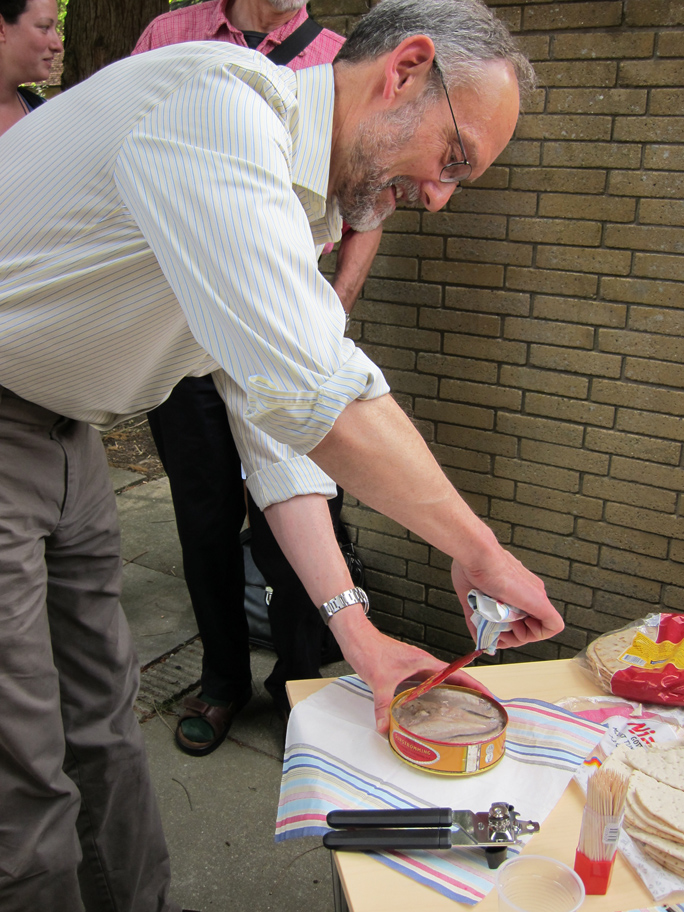
Oxford Symposium on Food & Cookery, 2010, held at St Catherine's college, Oxfordshire, UK

German food critic and author Wolfgang Fassbender wrote that "the biggest challenge when eating surströmming is to vomit only after the first bite, as opposed to before".

=== European Union ===
Due to being made from herring from the Baltic Sea, surströmming today contains higher levels of dioxins and PCBs than permitted in the EU. Sweden was granted exceptions to these rules from 2002 to 2011 and then applied for a renewal of the exceptions. Producers have said that if the application is denied, they will only be allowed to use herring less than 17 centimetres (6.7 in) long, as those contain lower levels, which will affect the availability of herring.

=== West German eviction ===
In 1982, a landlord evicted a tenant for intentionally spreading surströmming brine on 26 June 1982 on the edge of a witness's balcony and on the bushes in the garden. Prior to this, the tenant had already received a warning for spreading surströmming brine in the apartment building's stairwell on the night of 24–25 December 1981. The matter was brought to court, due to the tenant disputing the validity of the eviction's reasoning. In January 1984, the regional court of Cologne ruled that the termination was justified, after the landlord's party demonstrated their case by opening a can inside the courtroom. The ruling cited a violation of the tenancy agreement per § 573 of the Bürgerliches Gesetzbuch (civil code), stating that the court "had convinced itself that the disgusting smell of the fish brine far exceeded the degree that fellow tenants in the building could be expected to tolerate".

=== Airline bans ===
In April 2006, several major airlines (such as Air France, British Airways, Finnair and KLM) banned the fish, claiming that the pressurised cans of fish are potentially explosive. The sale of the fish was subsequently discontinued at Stockholm Arlanda Airport. Those who produce the fish have called the airlines' decision "culturally illiterate", claiming that it is a "myth that the tinned fish can explode".

== Museum ==
On 4 June 2005, the first surströmming museum in the world was opened in Skeppsmalen, 20 km (12 mi) south-east of Örnsköldsvik, a town at the northern end of the High Coast. The name of the museum is Fiskevistet (translated as 'The Fish Encampment').

== See also ==
- Delicacy
- Spekesild – herring pickled in salt

=== Other fermented fish dishes ===
- Cantonese salted fish
- Colatura di alici – typical sauce of Amalfi connected with garum
- Fesikh – Egyptian fermented fish
- Hákarl – Icelandic fermented shark
- Kusaya – Japanese fermented then dried fish
- Pla ra – fermented fish and rice flour seasoning common throughout Southeast Asia
- Pekasam – Malaysian and Indonesian fermented fish
- Prahok – fermented fish paste (usually mudfish) unique to Cambodia
- Rakfisk – Norwegian fermented freshwater fish
- Shiokara – Japanese seafood fermented in highly salted viscera
- Mam – Cambodian fermented fish dish with coconut milk
- Tungtap - Fermented fish used as dips and sauces in Meghalaya, India
- Ngari - Fermented fish product indigenous to the people of Manipur and used as a condiment.

=== Other strong-smelling foods ===
- Asafoetida – Indian spice derived from Ferula roots
- Century egg – Chinese preserved egg
- Durian – very pungent-smelling fruit from southeast Asia
- Kimchi – Korean side dish of fermented vegetables
- Kiviak – fermented birds in seal skin from Greenland
- Nattō – fermented soybeans, commonly consumed in Japan
- Akhuni - fermented soyabeans used by the Naga people
- Shrimp paste – prawn sauce or trasi, a fermented condiment used in Asian and Chinese cuisines
- Stinky tofu – Chinese fermented tofu with a strong odor
- Tyrolean grey cheese – a strongly flavoured cheese made in the Tyrolean Alp valleys of Austria
- Tungrymbai - Fermented soya bean paste considered a delicacy in Meghalaya, India.
