= Halobacteroides halobius =

Scientific classification
- Domain: Bacteria
- Kingdom: Bacillati
- Phylum: Bacillota
- Class: Clostridia
- Order: Halanaerobiales
- Family: Halobacteroidaceae
- Genus: Halobacteroides
- Species: H. halobius

Binomial name
- Halobacteroides halobius Oren et al. 1984

Type strain
- MD-1

Species of bacterium

Halobacteroides halobius is a species of bacteria, the type species of its genus. It is a moderately halophilic, anaerobic, long rod-shaped, motile, Gram-negative and non-sporulating bacterium.
