= Halanaerobacter lacunaris =

Scientific classification
- Domain: Bacteria
- Kingdom: Bacillati
- Phylum: Bacillota
- Class: Clostridia
- Order: Halanaerobiales
- Family: Halobacteroidaceae
- Genus: Halanaerobacter
- Species: H. lacunaris

Binomial name
- Halanaerobacter lacunaris (Zhilina et al. 1992) Rainey et al. 1995

Type strain
- TB21

Synonyms
- Haloanaerobacter lacunaris; Halobacteroides lacunaris

Species of bacterium

Halanaerobacter lacunaris is a Gram-negative and polyextremophile bacterium from the genus Halanaerobacter.
