= Halanaerobacter =

Scientific classification
- Domain: Bacteria
- Kingdom: Bacillati
- Phylum: Bacillota
- Class: Clostridia
- Order: Halanaerobiales
- Family: Halobacteroidaceae
- Genus: Halanaerobacter corrig. Liaw and Mah 1996

Type species
- Halanaerobacter chitinivorans corrig. Liaw & Mah 1996

Species
- H. chitinovorans; H. jeridensis; H. lacunaris; H. salinarius

Synonyms
- Haloanaerobacter (sic)

Genus of bacteria

Halanaerobaculum is a haloanaerobic genus of bacteria from the family Halobacteroidaceae.

== Phylogeny ==
The currently accepted taxonomy is based on the List of Prokaryotic names with Standing in Nomenclature (LPSN) and National Center for Biotechnology Information (NCBI).

16S rRNA based LTP_10_2024

- Halanaerobacter
  - H. jeridensis Mezghani et al. 2012
  - - - Halobacteroides elegans
      - H. lacunarum corrig. (Zhilina et al. 1992) Rainey et al. 1995
    - - H. chitinivorans corrig. Liaw & Mah 1996
      - H. salinarius Moune et al. 1999

120 marker proteins based GTDB 10-RS226

- Halanaerobacter
  H. jeridensis

== See also ==
- List of bacterial orders
- List of bacteria genera
