= Orenia metallireducens =

Scientific classification
- Domain: Bacteria
- Kingdom: Bacillati
- Phylum: Bacillota
- Class: Clostridia
- Order: Halanaerobiales
- Family: Halobacteroidaceae
- Genus: Orenia
- Species: O. metallireducens

Binomial name
- Orenia metallireducens Dong et al. 2016

Type strain
- Z6

Species of bacterium

Orenia metallireducens is a halophilic and metal-reducing bacterium from the genus Orenia which has been isolated from groundwater from the Illinois Basin.
