= Orenia sivashensis =

Scientific classification
- Domain: Bacteria
- Kingdom: Bacillati
- Phylum: Bacillota
- Class: Clostridia
- Order: Halanaerobiales
- Family: Halobacteroidaceae
- Genus: Orenia
- Species: O. sivashensis

Binomial name
- Orenia sivashensis Zhilina et al. 2000

Type strain
- Z-7191

Species of bacterium

Orenia sivashensis is an anaerobe and thermophilic bacterium from the genusf Orenia which has been isolated from the hypersaline lagoon of the Syvash in Crimea.
