= Orenia salinaria =

Scientific classification
- Domain: Bacteria
- Kingdom: Bacillati
- Phylum: Bacillota
- Class: Clostridia
- Order: Halanaerobiales
- Family: Halobacteroidaceae
- Genus: Orenia
- Species: O. salinaria

Binomial name
- Orenia salinaria Mouné et al. 2000

Type strain
- SG 3902

Species of bacterium

Orenia salinaria is a bacterium from the genusf Orenia which has been isolated from a commercial saltern from Salin-de-Giraud in France.
