= Halanaerobacter chitinovorans =

Scientific classification
- Domain: Bacteria
- Kingdom: Bacillati
- Phylum: Bacillota
- Class: Clostridia
- Order: Halanaerobiales
- Family: Halobacteroidaceae
- Genus: Halanaerobacter
- Species: H. chitinovorans

Binomial name
- Halanaerobacter chitinovorans corrig. Liaw and Mah 1996

Species of bacterium

Halanaerobacter chitinovorans is a species of bacteria, the type species of its genus. It is a halophilic, anaerobic, chitinolytic bacterium. Its cells are long, gram-negative, motile, flexible rods.
