= Donn Kushner =

Canadian microbiologist (1927–2001)

- Born: Donn Jean Kushner; March 29, 1927; Lake Charles, Louisiana, US
- Died: September 15, 2001 (aged 74); Toronto, Ontario, Canada
- Education: PhD
- Alma mater: McGill University
- Spouse: Eva Dubska (m. 1949)

Donn Jean Kushner (March 29, 1927 – September 15, 2001) was an American-born Canadian scientist and writer. He taught biology at the University of Ottawa and Toronto from 1965 to 1992 and authored both adult and children's books, some of which won awards.

== Biography ==
=== Early life and education ===
Donn Jean Kushner was born on March 29, 1927, in Lake Charles, Louisiana, United States.

In 1948, Kushner moved to Canada and became a Canadian Citizen. He studied at Harvard and McGill Universities, and earned a Bachelor of Science from Harvard in 1948, a Master of Science from McGill in 1950, and a PhD also from McGill in 1952.

=== Career ===
==== Scientist ====
Before his work in universities, Kushner was a research scientist for Agriculture and Agri-Food Canada in Sault Ste. Marie, Ontario, from 1954 to 1961, and was also a research scientist for the National Research Council in Ottawa from 1961 to 1965.

From 1965 to 1967, Kushner was an associate professor of biology at the University of Ottawa and was Professor of Biology from 1967 to 1988. He then left Ottawa and became a professor of biology at the University of Toronto from 1988 until his retirement in 1992 and was also a Fellow of Victoria College from 1988 to 1992. In 1988, Kushner joined the Departments of Microbiology and Botany, and the Institute for Environmental Studies at the University of Toronto. In 1992, he became professor emeritus in the Department of Botany.

During his time at these universities, Kushner authored several scientific articles and was the editor of Microbial Life in Extreme Environments, published in 1978. From 1977 to 1983, he co-edited the Canadian Journal of Microbiology. In 1986, Kushner received the Ottawa Biological and Biochemical Society Award and, in 1992, he received the Canadian Society of Microbiologists Award. Kushner was also president of the Canadian Society for Microbiology and edited Archives of Microbiology.

Two bacteria are named after Kushner: Halanaerobium kushneri and Salinivibrio kushnerii.

==== Writer ====
In 1981, Kushner published a collection of short fiction for adults called The Witness and Other Stories. Also in 1981, his book The Violin-Maker's Gift, after being published on March 30, 1981, won the Canadian Library Association Book of the Year Award. The book has been translated into Dutch, German, French and Polish. Kushner's other children's books have also won awards.

Kushner published several more children's books, including Uncle Jacob's Ghost Story (1986), A Book Dragon (1987), which won the National Chapter of Canada IODE Violet Downey Book Award in 1988, The House of the Good Spirits (1990), The Dinosaur Duster (1992), A Thief Among Statues (1993), The Night Voyagers (1995), and Peter's Pixie (2003), the latter of which was published posthumously.

Kushner's blend of fiction and fantasy in his books gave him a distinctive voice and won him critical acclaim as a modern fabulist, with parallels being drawn between him and French writer Antoine de Saint-Exupéry.

=== Death ===
Kushner died in Toronto after struggling against two illnesses, on September 15, 2001. His funeral took place from September 21 to 22 at Humphrey Funeral Home in Toronto.

== Personal life ==
In 1949, Donn Kushner married Eva Dubska. They had three sons.

Aside from writing, Kushner's passion was playing the violin and viola in chamber music groups.

== Bibliography ==
- The Violin-Maker's Gift (March 30, 1981)
- Uncle Jacob's Ghost Story (March 24, 1986)
- A Book Dragon (January 19, 1987)
- The House of the Good Spirits (November 6, 1990)
- The Dinosaur Duster (March 1, 1992)
- A Thief Among Statues (June 24, 1993)
- The Night Voyagers (September 15, 1995)
- Peter's Pixie (September 30, 2003; published posthumously)

All books credited as Donn Kushner unless otherwise stated.
