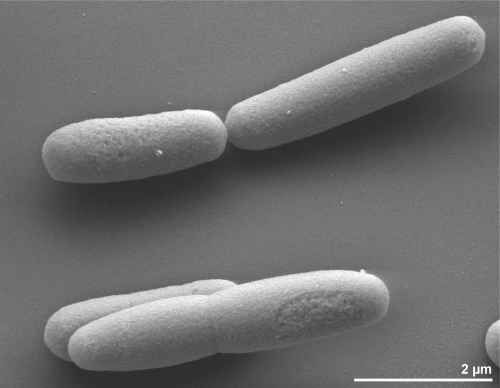
- Halanaerobium praevalens type species GSL^{T} – scanning electron micrograph

Scientific classification
- Domain: Bacteria
- Kingdom: Bacillati
- Phylum: Bacillota
- Class: Clostridia
- Order: Halanaerobiales
- Family: Halanaerobiaceae
- Genus: Halanaerobium
- Species: H. praevalens

Binomial name
- Halanaerobium praevalens Zeikus et al., 1984

Type strain
- GSL^{T} (a.k.a. DSM 2228 / ATCC 33744)

= Halanaerobium praevalens =

Species of bacterium

Halanaerobium praevalens is a moderately alkaliphilic, extremely halophilic bacterium that was first isolated from surface sediments of the Great Salt Lake, Utah and described by J.G. Zeikus et al. in 1983, with IJSB validation in 1984.

== Microbiology ==
Halanaerobium praevalens is an obligately anaerobic, Gram-negative, non-motile, non-sporulating, straight rod-shaped bacterium. The Great Salt Lake it was first isolated from is hypersaline, with surface sediments at >20% NaCl. The bacterium grows best at a concentration of ~13% NaCl, with no significant growth at <2% or ≥30%. The pH range for growth is between 6.0 and 9.0, with an optimum between 7.0 and 7.4. Temperature range for growth is >5 °C and <60 °C, with an optimum at 37 °C.

== Genome ==
As of 2011, H. praevalens's genome has been completely sequenced, utilizing the Illumina and 454 gene-sequencing platforms. The genome is 2,309,262 bp long, with 2,110 protein-coding, and 70 RNA genes. The bacterium's closest relative within Halanaerobium is thought to be H. alcaliphilum.

== Applications ==
Halanaerobium praevalens is of interest for bioremediation purposes, thanks to its ability to degrade organic pollutants. It is able to quickly reduce a variety of nitro-substituted aromatic compounds, and has been shown to be involved in carbon sequestration in the Great Salt Lake.

This chemoorganotroph also functions hydrolytically, fermenting complex organic matter, and producing intermediary metabolites for other trophic groups, including sulfate-reducing and methanogenic bacteria. H. praevalens is among the bacteria which are responsible for the fermentation of the Baltic Sea herring used to make the pungent Swedish delicacy surströmming.
