= Orenia =

Scientific classification
- Domain: Bacteria
- Kingdom: Bacillati
- Phylum: Bacillota
- Class: Clostridia
- Order: Halanaerobiales
- Family: Halobacteroidaceae
- Genus: Orenia; Rainey & Stackebrandt 1995

Type species
- Orenia marismortui (Oren et al. 1988) Rainey et al. 1995

Species
- O. chitinitropha; O. marismortui; "O. metallireducens"; O. salinaria; O. sivashensis

Genus of bacteria

Orenia is a genus of bacteria from the family Halobacteroidaceae. Orenia bacteria occurs in saline environments.

== Phylogeny ==
The currently accepted taxonomy is based on the List of Prokaryotic names with Standing in Nomenclature (LPSN) and National Center for Biotechnology Information (NCBI).

16S rRNA based LTP_10_2024

- Orenia
  - O. sivashensis Zhilina et al. 2000
  - - Halonatronum saccharophilum
    - - O. salinaria Moune et al. 2000
      - - O. marismortui (Oren et al. 1988) Rainey et al. 1995
        - - O. chitinitropha Sorokin & Kolganova 2014
          - Tepidibacillus decaturensis

120 marker proteins based GTDB 10-RS226

- - Halonatronum saccharophilum
  - - Orenia
      - "O. metallireducens" Dong et al. 2016
      - O. marismortui

== See also ==
- List of bacterial orders
- List of bacteria genera
