= Halanaerobacter salinarius =

Scientific classification
- Domain: Bacteria
- Kingdom: Bacillati
- Phylum: Bacillota
- Class: Clostridia
- Order: Halanaerobiales
- Family: Halobacteroidaceae
- Genus: Halanaerobacter
- Species: H. salinarius

Binomial name
- Halanaerobacter salinarius Mouné et al. 1999

Type strain
- SG 3903

Synonyms
- Haloanaerobacter salinarius

Species of bacterium

Halanaerobacter salinarius is a halophilic fermentative bacterium from the genus Halanaerobacter.
