= Halanaerobaculum =

Scientific classification
- Domain: Bacteria
- Kingdom: Bacillati
- Phylum: Bacillota
- Class: Clostridia
- Order: Halanaerobiales
- Family: Halobacteroidaceae
- Genus: Halanaerobaculum; Hedi et al. 2009
- Species: H. tunisiense

Binomial name
- Halanaerobaculum tunisiense Hedi et al. 2009

Genus of bacteria

Halanaerobaculum is a halophilic, anaerobic, non-spore-forming, rod-shaped and non-motile genus of bacteria from the family of Halobacteroidaceae with one known species (Halanaerobaculum tunisiense). Halanaerobaculum tunisiense has been isolated from hypersaline sediments from the salt lake Chott el Djerid in Tunisia.
