= Acetohalobium =

Scientific classification
- Domain: Bacteria
- Kingdom: Bacillati
- Phylum: Bacillota
- Class: Clostridia
- Order: Halanaerobiales
- Family: Halobacteroidaceae
- Genus: Acetohalobium; Zhilina and Zavarzin 1990

Type species
- Acetohalobium arabaticum Zhilina & Zavarzin 1990

Species
- Acetohalobium arabaticum

Genus of bacteria

Acetohalobium is a genus in the phylum Bacillota (Bacteria).

== Etymology ==
The name Acetohalobium derives from: Latin acetum, vinegar; Greek noun hals (ἅλς), salt; Greek bios (βίος), life; giving Acetohalobium, acetate-producing organism living in salt.

== Species ==
The genus contains a single species, A. arabaticum ( Zhilina and Zavarzin 1990), type species of the genus; Latin arabaticum, from Arabat, a peninsula between the Sea of Azov and Sivash.
