= Halarsenatibacter =

Scientific classification
- Domain: Bacteria
- Kingdom: Bacillati
- Phylum: Bacillota
- Class: Clostridia
- Order: Halanaerobiales
- Family: Halanaerobiaceae
- Genus: Halarsenatibacter; Blum et al. 2010
- Species: H. silvermanii

Binomial name
- Halarsenatibacter silvermanii Blum et al. 2010

Genus of bacteria

Halarsenatibacter is a Gram-negative, strictly anaerobic and motile genus of bacteria from the family Halanaerobiaceae with one known species (Halarsenatibacter silvermanii). Halarsenatibacter silvermanii has been isolate from the Searles Lake.
