= Kusaya =

Japanese dried and fermented fish

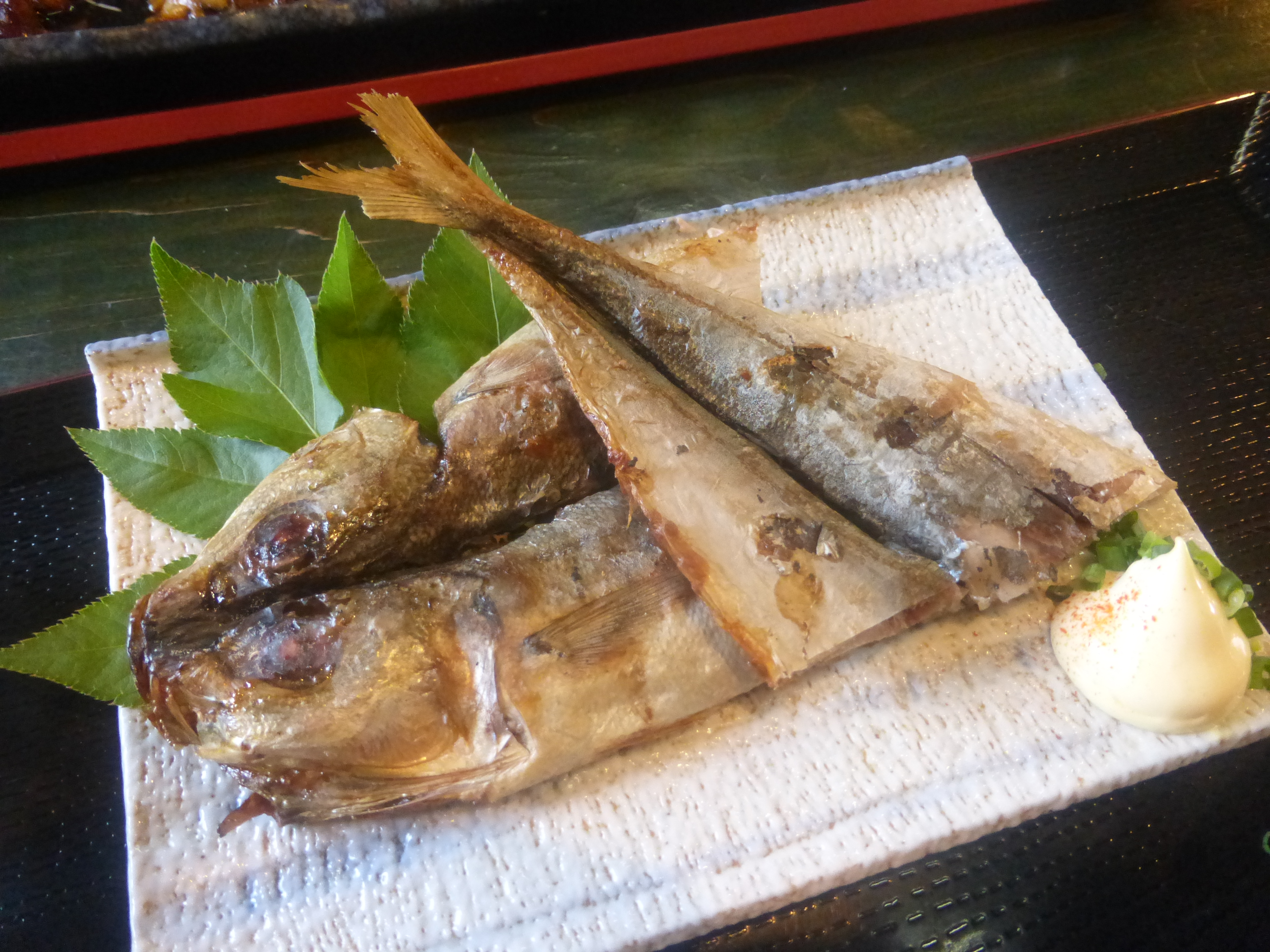
Freshly grilled kusaya on Hachijō-jima island

Kusaya (くさや) is a salted, dried and fermented fish that is produced in the Izu Islands, Japan. It has a pungent smell and is similar to the fermented Swedish herring surströmming.

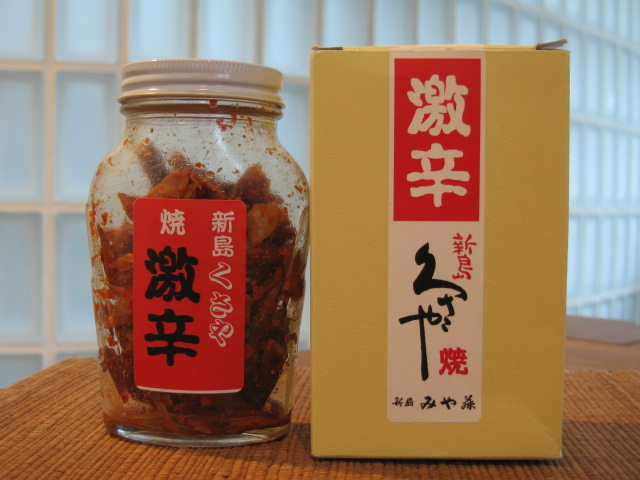
Bottled kusaya from Niijima island

== Taste ==
Though the smell of kusaya is strong, its taste is quite mellow. Kusaya is often eaten with Japanese sake or shōchū, particularly a local drink called Shima Jiman (literally island pride). The brine used to make kusaya, which includes many vitamins and organic acids such as acetic acid, propionic acid and amino acids, contributes much nutritional value to the resulting dried fish.

== History ==
Kusaya originated in the Izu Islands, probably on Niijima, where, during the Edo period people used to earn a living through salt making. Villagers paid taxes to the government with the salt they made, and as taxes were high, salt for fish-curing was used frugally. The same salt was used many times for this purpose, resulting in a pungent dried fish, which was later called kusaya. The resulting tea-colored, sticky, stinky brine was passed on from generation to generation as a family heirloom. Though kusaya is made on several of the Izu Islands today, it is said that kusaya from Niijima has the strongest odor.

== Making kusaya ==
Mackerel scad (Decapterus macarellus), flying fish and other similar species are used to make kusaya. The fish is washed in clear water many times before being soaked in a brine called kusaya eki (くさや液; lit. 'kusaya liquid/juice') for eight to twenty hours. This mixture has a salt concentration of 8%, compared to the concentration of 18% to 20% in common fish curing brines. After this process, the fish are laid out under the sun to dry for one or two days. The Niijima-Mura Museum on Niijima has several installations, including a video, on the making of kusaya.

== See also ==
- List of dried foods
- Sakana
