= Vertebrate mitochondrial code =

Alternative genetic code

The vertebrate mitochondrial code (translation table 2) is the genetic code found in the mitochondria of all vertebrata.

== Stop codons ==
=== AGA and AGG ===
AGA and AGG are not found to map to any amino acid in vertebrate mitogenomes, and in some cases appear to act as stop codons (as far as comparison of the mRNA against the produced peptide goes). Because these codons do code for amino acids in other animal mitogenomes, this seems to be a shared feature of vertebrates, occurring early in their evolution.

However, at least in humans it has now been shown that AGA and AGG sequences are not recognized as termination codons by MTRF1 or MTRF1L (the release factors). Instead, the mitoribosome ends up stalling because there is no tRNA for reading them, and a -1 frameshift eventually occurs to move the ribosome back to a regular UAG stop codon. In the two human mRNAs with these pseudo-stop codons (CO1 and ND6), a 3' UTR with some secondary structure helps make sure this process happen by deterring translational readthrough. Presumably this is also the process in vertebrates with similar pseudo-stop codons.

=== Incomplete stop codons ===
Mitochondrial genes in some vertebrates (including humans) have incomplete stop codons ending in U or UA, which become complete termination codons (UAA) upon subsequent polyadenylation.

== Translation table ==
Amino acids biochemical properties	nonpolar	polar	basic	acidic	Termination: stop codon

Mitochondrial genetic code
1st base	2nd base								3rd base
1st base	U		C		A		G		3rd base
U	UUU	(Phe/F) Phenylalanine	UCU	(Ser/S) Serine	UAU	(Tyr/Y) Tyrosine	UGU	(Cys/C) Cysteine	U
U	UUC	(Phe/F) Phenylalanine	UCC	(Ser/S) Serine	UAC	(Tyr/Y) Tyrosine	UGC	(Cys/C) Cysteine	C
U	UUA	(Leu/L) Leucine	UCA	(Ser/S) Serine	UAA	Stop	UGA	(Trp/W) Tryptophan	A
U	UUG	(Leu/L) Leucine	UCG	(Ser/S) Serine	UAG	Stop	UGG	(Trp/W) Tryptophan	G
C	CUU	(Leu/L) Leucine	CCU	(Pro/P) Proline	CAU	(His/H) Histidine	CGU	(Arg/R) Arginine	U
C	CUC	(Leu/L) Leucine	CCC	(Pro/P) Proline	CAC	(His/H) Histidine	CGC	(Arg/R) Arginine	C
C	CUA	(Leu/L) Leucine	CCA	(Pro/P) Proline	CAA	(Gln/Q) Glutamine	CGA	(Arg/R) Arginine	A
C	CUG	(Leu/L) Leucine	CCG	(Pro/P) Proline	CAG	(Gln/Q) Glutamine	CGG	(Arg/R) Arginine	G
A	AUU	(Ile/I) Isoleucine	ACU	(Thr/T) Threonine	AAU	(Asn/N) Asparagine	AGU	(Ser/S) Serine	U
A	AUC	(Ile/I) Isoleucine	ACC	(Thr/T) Threonine	AAC	(Asn/N) Asparagine	AGC	(Ser/S) Serine	C
A	AUA	(Met/M) Methionine	ACA	(Thr/T) Threonine	AAA	(Lys/K) Lysine	AGA	Stop	A
A	AUG^{[A]}	(Met/M) Methionine	ACG	(Thr/T) Threonine	AAG	(Lys/K) Lysine	AGG	Stop	G
G	GUU	(Val/V) Valine	GCU	(Ala/A) Alanine	GAU	(Asp/D) Aspartic acid	GGU	(Gly/G) Glycine	U
G	GUC	(Val/V) Valine	GCC	(Ala/A) Alanine	GAC	(Asp/D) Aspartic acid	GGC	(Gly/G) Glycine	C
G	GUA	(Val/V) Valine	GCA	(Ala/A) Alanine	GAA	(Glu/E) Glutamic acid	GGA	(Gly/G) Glycine	A
G	GUG	(Val/V) Valine	GCG	(Ala/A) Alanine	GAG	(Glu/E) Glutamic acid	GGG	(Gly/G) Glycine	G

^{A} The codon AUG both codes for methionine and serves as an initiation site: the first AUG in an mRNA's coding region is where translation into protein begins.

== Differences from the standard code ==
DNA codons	RNA codons	This code (2)	Standard code (1)
AGA	AGA	STOP = Ter (*)	Arg (R)
AGG	AGG	STOP = Ter (*)	Arg (R)
ATA	AUA	Met (M)	Ile (I)
TGA	UGA	Trp (W)	STOP = Ter (*)

=== Alternative initiation codons ===
- Bos: AUA
- Homo: AUA, AUU
- Mus: AUA, AUU, AUC
- Coturnix, Gallus: also GUG

== See also ==
- List of genetic codes
