= Tepidibacillus fermentans =

Scientific classification
- Domain: Bacteria
- Kingdom: Bacillati
- Phylum: Bacillota
- Class: Bacilli
- Order: Bacillales
- Family: Bacillaceae
- Genus: Tepidibacillus
- Species: T. fermentans

Binomial name
- Tepidibacillus fermentans Slobodkina et al. 2014

Type strain
- DSM 23802, STGH, VKM B-2671

Species of bacterium

Tepidibacillus fermentans is a Gram-positive, moderately thermophilic, spore-forming and motile bacterium from the genus of Tepidibacillus which has been isolated from an underground gas storage in Severo-Stavropolskoye in Russia.
