= Eva Kushner =

Canadian scholar (1929–2023)

Eva Kushner OC FRSC
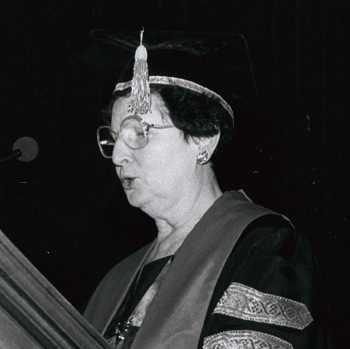

10th President and Vice-Chancellor of Victoria University, Toronto
- In office 1987 – 1994
- Chancellor: Northrop Frye; Sang Chul Lee
- Preceded by: Goldwin S. French
- Succeeded by: Roseann Runte

Personal details
- Born: Eva Milada Ruth Dubska; June 18, 1929 Prague, Czechoslovakia
- Died: January 28, 2023 (aged 93) Toronto, Ontario, Canada
- Spouse: Donn Kushner (m. 1949; died 2001)
- Children: 3
- Education: McGill University (BA, MA, PhD)

Eva Milada Ruth Kushner OC FRSC (née Dubska; June 18, 1929 – January 28, 2023) was a Canadian scholar of Comparative literature and French, Renaissance, and Canadian literature. She was the President of Victoria University from 1987 to 1994. In 1997, she was made an Officer of the Order of Canada. She was the first woman to be a university president in Ontario, Canada.

== Biography ==
Eva Dubska was born in Prague, Czechoslovakia (now Czechia and Slovakia) on June 18, 1929. She lived in France from 1939 to 1945, returned briefly to Czechoslovakia after World War II, and then moved to Canada in 1946.

Kushner attended McGill University and obtained a BA in Philosophy and Psychology in 1948. In 1950, she obtained an MA in Philosophy and in 1956, she obtained a PhD in French Literature. In 1971, she was named as a Fellow of the Royal Society of Canada.

Kushner became President of Victoria University in 1987 and held that position until 1994. She also served as Chair of the Royal Society of Canada Committee on Freedom of Scholarship and Science from 1993 to 1998. In 1997, the Canadian government awarded her the Order of Canada award.

== Personal life ==
In 1949, Eva Dubska married scientist and writer Donn Kushner. The two were together until his death in 2001. They had three sons. Kushner died on January 28, 2023, at the age of 93.

== Works ==
=== As author ===
Year	Title	Translated title	Ref.
1961	Patrice de la Tour du Pin		
1961	Le mythe d'Orphee dans la litterature francaise contemporaine	The myth of Orphee in contemporary French literature	
1963	Chants de Boheme	Songs of Bohemia	
1967	Saint-Denys Garneau		
1972	Francois Mauriac		

=== As editor ===
Year	Title	Translated title	Ref.
1984	Renewals in the Theory of Literary History		
1995	La problematique du sujet chez Montaigne	The problematic of the subject in Montaigne	
1996	Constraints to Freedom of Scholarship and Science		
