= Tepidibacillus infernus =

Scientific classification
- Domain: Bacteria
- Kingdom: Bacillati
- Phylum: Bacillota
- Class: Bacilli
- Order: Bacillales
- Family: Bacillaceae
- Genus: Tepidibacillus
- Species: T. infernus

Binomial name
- Tepidibacillus infernus Podosokorskaya et al. 2016

Type strain
- DSM 28123, MBL-TLP, VKM B-2949

Species of bacterium

Tepidibacillus infernus is an aerotolerant anaerobic, organotrophic, spore-forming and moderately thermophilic bacterium from the genus of Tepidibacillus which has been isolated from microbial mat from the TauTona Gold Mine in South Africa.
