= Tunnbröd =

Swedish flatbread

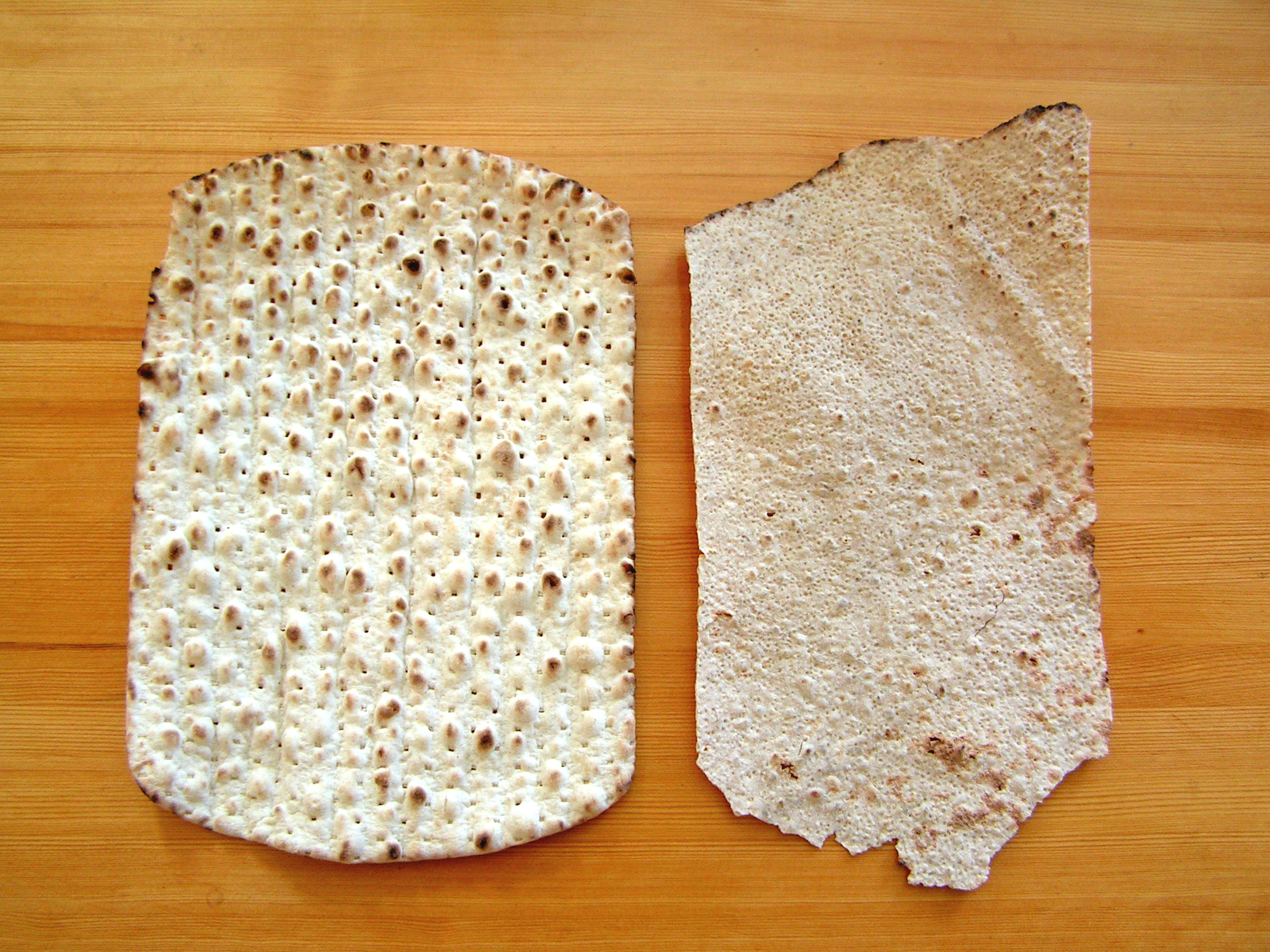
- Two varieties of Swedish Tunnbröd. Left is a modern version that contains rye, wheat and yeast, on the right is a traditional version made with milk and barley.
- Type: Flatbread
- Place of origin: Sweden
- Main ingredients: Wheat, barley or rye flour

Tunnbröd (Swedish: [ˈtɵ̂nːbrøːd]; literally 'thinbread') is a Swedish version of flatbread. Tunnbröd can be soft or crisp, and comes in many variants depending on choice of grain, leavening agent (or lack thereof) and rolling pin. The dough is made from any combination of wheat, barley, oat and rye; the leavening agent can be both yeast and ammonium carbonate.

Soft tunnbröd is commonly used like a crêpe or tortilla as a wrap for other food. A popular fast food dish is soft tunnbröd rolled around mashed potatoes, a hot dog, vegetables, ketchup, mustard and shrimp salad, known as tunnbröd roll (tunnbrödsrulle).

Another traditional old Swedish method of eating soft tunnbröd is burrito-style, combined with mashed potatoes and roasted herring. Traditionally, tunnbröd is eaten with fermented herring (surströmming) as a surströmming sandwich (surströmmingsklämma) and as dip in the pot (dopp i grytan). A spiced soft bread is generally used for this, and the bread is soaked in the stock left from cooking the Christmas ham.

Crisp tunnbröd differs from knäckebröd (crispbread) in being thinner and more compact, containing fewer air bubbles. The consistency and taste of tunnbröd can vary a lot, as recipes and preparation of the bread differ depending on the bakery. Traditionally housewives would keep recipes a closely guarded secret only shared with other family members.

== See also ==
- Crispbread – flat and dry type of cracker
- Mjukkaka – Swedish round flatbread
- Lefse – traditional soft Norwegian flatbread
- Flatkaka – traditional Icelandic flatbread
- Matza – traditional Jewish unleavened flatbread
- Tortilla – thin flatbread popular in Mexico and Central America
- Yufka – unleavened flat bread in Turkish cuisine
- Roti – South Asian round flatbread
- Lavash – thin flatbread common to the cuisines of South Caucasus, Western Asia, and the areas surrounding the Caspian Sea.
