= Mjukkaka =

Swedish flatbread

- Type: Bread
- Place of origin: Sweden
- Main ingredients: Rye flour, yeast, margarine, water, salt, milk, light treacle

Mjukkaka is a round flatbread, with a size of a plate, typically baked in a brick oven, and originates from northern Sweden. They are usually made of rye flour, yeast, margarine, water, salt, milk and light treacle. Mjukkaka is used as any regular bread and are served at breakfast or lunch with just butter. The recipe is known to be handed over generation through generation in the northern part of Sweden. The ingredients may vary depending on location and heritage.

== Baking method ==
Mjukkaka can be baked in an oven (directly at the bottom), in a hot pan or even directly on top of your stove on a heated plate. Making inroads into the bread (by using a rolling pin with deep grooves or just a regular fork) is done in order for it to not rise during baking and instead stay flat.

== Variations ==
Liquid from baking blodpalt is used in some recipes instead of milk in some parts of northern Sweden around Luleå. In some recipes rye flour is mixed with wheat or includes just wheat.

Today there are similarities to this bread that are sold in stores in Sweden. One popular variant is the Swedish Polarbröd, made by the company Polarbröd. There are also other variants like Tunnbröd.

== See also ==
- Flatbread
- Crispbread
