= Selenihalanaerobacter =

Scientific classification
- Domain: Bacteria
- Kingdom: Bacillati
- Phylum: Bacillota
- Class: Clostridia
- Order: Halanaerobiales
- Family: Halobacteroidaceae
- Genus: Selenihalanaerobacter; Switzer Blum et al. 2001
- Species: S. shriftii

Binomial name
- Selenihalanaerobacter shriftii Switzer Blum et al. 2001

Synonyms
- Selenohalobacter (sic)

Genus of bacteria

Selenihalanaerobacter is a Gram-negative, obligately anaerobic and halophilic genus of bacteria from the family Halobacteroidaceae with one known species, Selenihalanaerobacter shriftii. Selenihalanaerobacter shriftii has been isolated from the Dead Sea. Selenihalanaerobacter shriftii grows by respiration of selenate.
