= Halocella =

Scientific classification
- Domain: Bacteria
- Kingdom: Bacillati
- Phylum: Bacillota
- Class: Clostridia
- Order: Halanaerobiales
- Family: Halanaerobiaceae
- Genus: Halocella; Simankova et al. 1994
- Species: H. cellulosilytica

Binomial name
- Halocella cellulosilytica corrig. Simankova et al. 1994

Genus of bacteria

Halocella is a Gram-negative, non-spore-forming, obligately anaerobic and moderately halophilic genus of bacteria from the family Halanaerobiaceae with one known species (Halocella cellulosilytica). Halocella cellulosilytica has been isolated from the hypersaline lagoon of the Lake Syvash on the Crimea.
