= Acetohalobium arabaticum =

Scientific classification
- Domain: Bacteria
- Kingdom: Bacillati
- Phylum: Bacillota
- Class: Clostridia
- Order: Halanaerobiales
- Family: Halobacteroidaceae
- Genus: Acetohalobium
- Species: A. arabaticum

Binomial name
- Acetohalobium arabaticum Zhilina & Zavarzin 1990

Species of bacterium

Acetohalobium arabaticum is the type species of the genus Acetohalobium. It is a prokaryote that can expand its genetic code from 20 to 21 amino acids (by including pyrrolysine) under different conditions of growth.

== Strains ==
Strain Z-7288 (= DSM 5501 = ATCC 49924) is the type strain of the species.
