= Halobacteroides =

Scientific classification
- Domain: Bacteria
- Kingdom: Bacillati
- Phylum: Bacillota
- Class: Clostridia
- Order: Halanaerobiales
- Family: Halobacteroidaceae
- Genus: Halobacteroides; Oren et al. 1984

Type species
- Halobacteroides halobius Oren et al. 1984

Species
- H. elegans; H. halobius

Genus of bacteria

Halobacteroides is a Gram-negative strictly anaerobic, chemoorganotrophic genus of bacteria from the family Halobacteroidaceae.
