= Sporohalobacter =

Scientific classification
- Domain: Bacteria
- Kingdom: Bacillati
- Phylum: Bacillota
- Class: Clostridia
- Order: Halanaerobiales
- Family: Halobacteroidaceae
- Genus: Sporohalobacter; Oren et al. 1988

Type species
- Sporohalobacter lortetii (Oren 1984) Oren et al. 1988

Species
- S. lortetii; S. salinus

Genus of bacteria

Sporohalobacter are a genus of anaerobic bacteria belonging to the family Haloanaerobiaceae. The organisms are spore-forming bacteria that grow in hypersaline environments.

== Phylogeny ==
The currently accepted taxonomy is based on the List of Prokaryotic names with Standing in Nomenclature (LPSN) and National Center for Biotechnology Information (NCBI).

16S rRNA based LTP_10_2024

- Sporohalobacter
  - S. lortetii (Oren 1984) Oren et al. 1988
  - S. salinus Ben Abdallah et al. 2015

120 marker proteins based GTDB 10-RS226

- Sporohalobacter
  S. salinus

== See also ==
- List of bacterial orders
- List of bacteria genera
