= Tepidibacillus =

Scientific classification
- Domain: Bacteria
- Kingdom: Bacillati
- Phylum: Bacillota
- Class: Bacilli
- Order: Bacillales
- Family: Bacillaceae
- Genus: Tepidibacillus; Slobodkina et al. 2014

Type species
- Tepidibacillus fermentans Slobodkina et al. 2014

Species
- T. decaturensis; T. fermentans; T. infernus; T. marianensis

Genus of bacteria

Tepidibacillus is a genus of bacteria from the family Bacillaceae.

== Phylogeny ==
The currently accepted taxonomy is based on the List of Prokaryotic names with Standing in Nomenclature (LPSN) and National Center for Biotechnology Information (NCBI).

16S rRNA based LTP_10_2024

- - Tepidibacillus infernus Podosokorskaya et al. 2016
  - - Vulcanibacillus
    - - Calculibacillus
      - Tepidibacillus fermentans

120 marker proteins based GTDB 09-RS220

- Tepidibacillus
  - T. decaturensis Dong et al. 2016
  - T. fermentans Slobodkina et al. 2014
