= Halanaerobium kushneri =

Scientific classification
- Domain: Bacteria
- Kingdom: Bacillati
- Phylum: Bacillota
- Class: Clostridia
- Order: Halanaerobiales
- Family: Halanaerobiaceae
- Genus: Halanaerobium
- Species: H. kushneri

Binomial name
- Halanaerobium kushneri Bhupathiraju et al. 1999

Synonyms
- Halanaerobium kushnerii Haloanaerobium kushneri Haloanaerobium kushnerii

Species of bacterium

Halanaerobium kushneri is a strictly anaerobic and halophilic bacterium from the genus Halanaerobium.
