= Halobacteroides elegans =

Scientific classification
- Domain: Bacteria
- Kingdom: Bacillati
- Phylum: Bacillota
- Class: Clostridia
- Order: Halanaerobiales
- Family: Halobacteroidaceae
- Genus: Halobacteroides
- Species: H. elegans

Binomial name
- Halobacteroides elegans Zhilina et al. 1997

Species of bacterium

Halobacteroides elegans is a strictly anaerobic and halophilic bacterium from the genus Halobacteroides.
