= Halanaerobium =

Scientific classification
- Domain: Bacteria
- Kingdom: Bacillati
- Phylum: Bacillota
- Class: Clostridia
- Order: Halanaerobiales
- Family: Halanaerobiaceae
- Genus: Halanaerobium; Zeikus et al. 1984

Type species
- Halanaerobium praevalens Zeikus et al. 1984

Species
- See text

Synonyms
- Haloanaerobium (sic); Haloincola Zhilina et al. 1992

Genus of bacteria

Halanaerobium is a gram-negative, non-endospore-forming, rod-shaped, and strictly anaerobic genus of bacteria from the family Halanaerobiaceae.

== Phylogeny ==
The currently accepted taxonomy is based on the List of Prokaryotic names with Standing in Nomenclature (LPSN) and National Center for Biotechnology Information (NCBI).

16S rRNA based LTP_10_2024

- Halanaerobium
  - H. salsuginis corrig. Bhupathiraju et al. 1994
  - - - Halonatronomonas betaini Detkova, Boltyanskaya & Kevbrin 2023
      - - H. polyolivorans Boltyanskaya et al. 2024
        - - H. fermentans Kobayashi et al. 2000
          - H. lacusrosei corrig. Cayol et al. 1995
    - - H. acetethylicum corrig. (Rengpipat et al. 1989) Rainey et al. 1995
      - - H. congolense Ravot et al. 1998
        - - H. sehlinense Abdeljabbar et al. 2013
          - - - H. alcaliphilum Tsai et al. 1995
              - H. praevalens Zeikus et al. 1984
            - - H. kushneri Bhupathiraju et al. 1999
              - H. saccharolyticum (Zhilina et al. 1992) Rainey et al. 1995

120 marker proteins based GTDB 10-RS226

- Halanaerobium
  - - "H. hydrogeniformans" Brown et al. 2011
    - H. polyolivorans
  - - H. salsuginis
    - - H. praevalens
      - - H. kushneri
        - - H. congolense
          - H. saccharolyticum

== See also ==
- List of bacterial orders
- List of bacteria genera
