= MT-ATP8 =

Mitochondrial protein-coding gene whose product is involved in ATP synthesis

Identifiers
- Aliases: MT-ATP8, ATPase8, MT-ATP8, ATP synthase F0 subunit 8, ATP8
- External IDs: OMIM: 516070; MGI: 99926; GeneCards: MT-ATP8
Gene location (Human)
Chr.	Mitochondrial DNA (human)
Band	n/a	Start	8,366 bp
Band	n/a	End	8,572 bp
Gene location (Mouse)
Chr.	Mitochondrial DNA (mouse)
Band	n/a	Start	7,766 bp
Band	n/a	End	7,969 bp
RNA expression pattern
Bgee	Human / Mouse (ortholog); Top expressed in: right hemisphere of cerebellum; right lung; Descending thoracic aorta; gastrocnemius muscle; right ovary; olfactory zone of nasal mucosa; right adrenal cortex; superior frontal gyrus; subcutaneous adipose tissue; left adrenal gland / Top expressed in: striatum of neuraxis; ventricular zone; ganglionic eminence; hypothalamus; neural tube; urinary bladder; dentate gyrus of hippocampal formation granule cell; white adipose tissue; adrenal gland; zone of skin; More reference expression data
BioGPS	n/a
Gene ontology
Molecular function	ATPase activity; transmembrane transporter activity; proton transmembrane transporter activity
Cellular component	integral component of membrane; mitochondrial inner membrane; mitochondrial proton-transporting ATP synthase complex, coupling factor F(o); mitochondrion; membrane; mitochondrial membranes; proton-transporting ATP synthase complex, coupling factor F(o); mitochondrial proton-transporting ATP synthase complex
Biological process	mitochondrial ATP synthesis coupled proton transport; ATP synthesis coupled proton transport; ion transport; ATP biosynthetic process; cristae formation
Sources:Amigo / QuickGO
Orthologs
Databases	NCBI: entry; OMA: entry
Species	Human	Mouse
Entrez	4509	17706
Ensembl	ENSG00000228253	ENSMUSG00000064356
UniProt	P03928	P03930
RefSeq (mRNA)	n/a	n/a
RefSeq (protein)	n/a	NP_904332
Location (UCSC)	Chr M: 0.01 – 0.01 Mb	Chr M: 0.01 – 0.01 Mb
PubMed search
- Wikidata
View/Edit Human	View/Edit Mouse

Location of the MT-ATP8 gene in the human mitochondrial genome. MT-ATP8 is one of the two ATP synthase mitochondrial genes (red boxes).

The 46-nucleotide overlap in the reading frames of the human mitochondrial genes MT-ATP8 and MT-ATP6. For each nucleotide triplet (square brackets), the corresponding amino acid is given (one-letter code), either in the +1 frame for MT-ATP8 (in red) or in the +3 frame for MT-ATP6 (in blue).

ATP synthase protein 8 (metazoa)

Identifiers
- Symbol: ATP-synt_8
- Pfam: PF00895
- Pfam clan: CL0255
- InterPro: IPR001421
Available protein structures:
- PDB: IPR001421 PF00895 (ECOD; PDBsum)
- AlphaFold: IPR001421; PF00895

Plant ATP synthase F0 subunit 8

Identifiers
- Symbol: YMF19
- Pfam: PF02326
- Pfam clan: CL0255
- InterPro: IPR003319
Available protein structures:
- PDB: IPR003319 PF02326 (ECOD; PDBsum)
- AlphaFold: IPR003319; PF02326

Fungal ATP synthase protein 8 (A6L)

Identifiers
- Symbol: Fun_ATP-synt_8
- Pfam: PF05933
- Pfam clan: CL0255
- InterPro: IPR009230
Available protein structures:
- PDB: IPR009230 PF05933 (ECOD; PDBsum)
- AlphaFold: IPR009230; PF05933

MT-ATP8 (or ATP8) is a mitochondrial gene with the full name 'mitochondrially encoded ATP synthase membrane subunit 8' that encodes a subunit of mitochondrial ATP synthase, ATP synthase F_{o} subunit 8 (or subunit A6L). This subunit belongs to the F_{o} complex of the large, transmembrane F-type ATP synthase. This enzyme, which is also known as complex V, is responsible for the final step of oxidative phosphorylation in the electron transport chain. Specifically, one segment of ATP synthase allows positively charged ions, called protons, to flow across a specialized membrane inside mitochondria. Another segment of the enzyme uses the energy created by this proton flow to convert a molecule called adenosine diphosphate (ADP) to ATP. Subunit 8 differs in sequence between Metazoa, plants and Fungi.

== Structure ==
The ATP synthase protein 8 of human and other mammals is encoded in the mitochondrial genome by the MT-ATP8 gene. When the complete human mitochondrial genome was first published, the MT-ATP8 gene was described as the unidentified reading frame URF A6L. An unusual feature of the MT-ATP8 gene is its 46-nucleotide overlap with the MT-ATP6 gene. With respect to the reading frame (+1) of MT-ATP8, the MT-ATP6 gene starts on the +3 reading frame.

The MT-ATP8 protein weighs 8 kDa and is composed of 68 amino acids. The protein is a subunit of the F_{1}F_{o} ATPase, also known as Complex V, which consists of 14 nuclear- and 2 mitochondrial-encoded subunits. F-type ATPases consist of two structural domains, F_{1} containing the extramembraneous catalytic core and F_{o} containing the membrane proton channel, linked together by a central stalk and a peripheral stalk. As an A subunit, MT-ATP8 is contained within the non-catalytic, transmembrane F_{o} portion of the complex, comprising the proton channel. The catalytic portion of mitochondrial ATP synthase consists of 5 different subunits (alpha, beta, gamma, delta, and epsilon) assembled with a stoichiometry of 3 alpha, 3 beta, and a single representative of the other 3. The proton channel consists of three main subunits (a, b, c). This gene encodes the delta subunit of the catalytic core. Alternatively spliced transcript variants encoding the same isoform have been identified.

== Function ==
The MT-ATP8 gene encodes a subunit of mitochondrial ATP synthase, located within the thylakoid membrane and the inner mitochondrial membrane. Mitochondrial ATP synthase catalyzes ATP synthesis, utilizing an electrochemical gradient of protons across the inner membrane during oxidative phosphorylation. The F_{o} region causes rotation of F_{1}, which has a water-soluble component that hydrolyzes ATP and together, the F_{1}F_{o} creates a pathway for movement of protons across the membrane.

This protein subunit appears to be an integral component of the stator stalk in yeast mitochondrial F-ATPases. The stator stalk is anchored in the membrane, and acts to prevent futile rotation of the ATPase subunits relative to the rotor during coupled ATP synthesis/hydrolysis. This subunit may have an analogous function in Metazoa.

== Nomenclature ==
The nomenclature of the enzyme has a long history. The F_{1} fraction derives its name from the term "Fraction 1" and F_{o} (written as a subscript letter "o", not "zero") derives its name from being the binding fraction for oligomycin, a type of naturally-derived antibiotic that is able to inhibit the F_{o} unit of ATP synthase. The F_{o} region of ATP synthase is a proton pore that is embedded in the mitochondrial membrane. It consists of three main subunits A, B, and C, and (in humans) six additional subunits, d, e, f, g, MT-ATP6 (or F6), and MT-ATP8 (or A6L). 3D structure of E. coli homologue of this subunit was modeled based on electron microscopy data (chain M of PDB: 1c17). It forms a transmembrane 4-α-bundle.

== Clinical Significance ==
Mutations to MT-ATP8 and other genes affecting oxidative phosphorylation in the mitochondria have been associated with a variety of neurodegenerative and cardiovascular disorders, including mitochondrial complex V deficiency, Leber's hereditary optic neuropathy (LHON), mitochondrial encephalomyopathy with stroke-like episodes (MELAS), Leigh syndrome, and NARP syndrome. Most of the body's cells contain thousands of mitochondria, each with one or more copies of mitochondrial DNA. The severity of some mitochondrial disorders is associated with the percentage of mitochondria in each cell that has a particular genetic change. People with Leigh syndrome due to a MT-ATP6 gene mutation tend to have a very high percentage of mitochondria with the mutation (from more than 90 percent to 95 percent). The less-severe features of NARP result from a lower percentage of mitochondria with the mutation, typically 70 percent to 90 percent. Because these two conditions result from the same genetic changes and can occur in different members of a single family, researchers believe that they may represent a spectrum of overlapping features instead of two distinct syndromes.

Mitochondrial complex V deficiency presents with heterogeneous clinical manifestations including neuropathy, ataxia, hypertrophic cardiomyopathy. Hypertrophic cardiomyopathy can present with negligible to extreme hypertrophy, minimal to extensive fibrosis and myocyte disarray, absent to severe left ventricular outflow tract obstruction, and distinct septal contours/morphologies with extremely varying clinical course.

Mitochondrial complex V deficiency is a shortage (deficiency) or loss of function in complex V of the electron transport chain that can cause a wide variety of signs and symptoms affecting many organs and systems of the body, particularly the nervous system and the heart. The disorder can be life-threatening in infancy or early childhood. Affected individuals may have feeding problems, slow growth, low muscle tone (hypotonia), extreme fatigue (lethargy), and developmental delay. They tend to develop elevated levels of lactic acid in the blood (lactic acidosis), which can cause nausea, vomiting, weakness, and rapid breathing. High levels of ammonia in the blood (hyperammonemia) can also occur in affected individuals, and in some cases result in abnormal brain function (encephalopathy) and damage to other organs. Ataxia, microcephaly, developmental delay and intellectual disability have been observed in patients with a frameshift mutation in MT-ATP6. This causes a C insertion at position 8612 that results in a truncated protein only 36 amino acids long, and two T > C single-nucleotide polymorphisms at positions 8610 and 8614 that result in a homopolymeric cytosine stretch.

Hypertrophic cardiomyopathy, a common feature of mitochondrial complex V deficiency, is characterized by thickening (hypertrophy) of the cardiac muscle that can lead to heart failure. The m.8528T>C mutation occurs in the overlapping region of the MT-ATP6 and MT-ATP8 genes and has been described in multiple patients with infantile cardiomyopathy. This mutation changes the initiation codon in MT-ATP6 to threonine as well as a change from tryptophan to arginine at position 55 of MT-ATP8. Individuals with mitochondrial complex V deficiency may also have a characteristic pattern of facial features, including a high forehead, curved eyebrows, outside corners of the eyes that point downward (downslanting palpebral fissures), a prominent bridge of the nose, low-set ears, thin lips, and a small chin (micrognathia).

Infantile hypertrophic cardiomyopathy (CMHI) is also caused by mutations affecting distinct genetic loci, including MT-ATP6 and MT-ATP8. An infantile form of hypertrophic cardiomyopathy, a heart disorder characterized by ventricular hypertrophy, which is usually asymmetric and often involves the interventricular septum. The symptoms include dyspnea, syncope, collapse, palpitations, and chest pain. They can be readily provoked by exercise. The disorder has inter- and intrafamilial variability ranging from benign to malignant forms with high risk of cardiac failure and sudden cardiac death.
