= Tepidibacillus decaturensis =

Scientific classification
- Domain: Bacteria
- Kingdom: Bacillati
- Phylum: Bacillota
- Class: Bacilli
- Order: Bacillales
- Family: Bacillaceae
- Genus: Tepidibacillus
- Species: T. decaturensis

Binomial name
- Tepidibacillus decaturensis Dong et al. 2016

Type strain
- ATCC BAA-2644, DSM 103037, strain Z9

Species of bacterium

Tepidibacillus decaturensis is a Gram-negative, microaerophilic, rod-shaped and moderately thermophilic bacterium from the genus of Tepidibacillus which has been isolated from groundwater from the Mt. Simon Sandstone in Decatur in the United States.
