= ATP5MG =

Protein-coding gene in the species Homo sapiens

Identifiers
- Aliases: ATP5MG, ATP5JG, ATP synthase, H+ transporting, mitochondrial Fo complex subunit G, ATP synthase membrane subunit g, ATP5L
- External IDs: OMIM: 617473; MGI: 1351597; GeneCards: ATP5MG

Gene location (Human)
Chr.	Chromosome 11 (human)
Band	11q23.3	Start	118,401,346 bp
Band	11q23.3	End	118,433,278 bp

Gene location (Mouse)
Chr.	Chromosome 9 (mouse)
Band	9|9 A5.2	Start	44,823,855 bp
Band	9|9 A5.2	End	44,832,040 bp
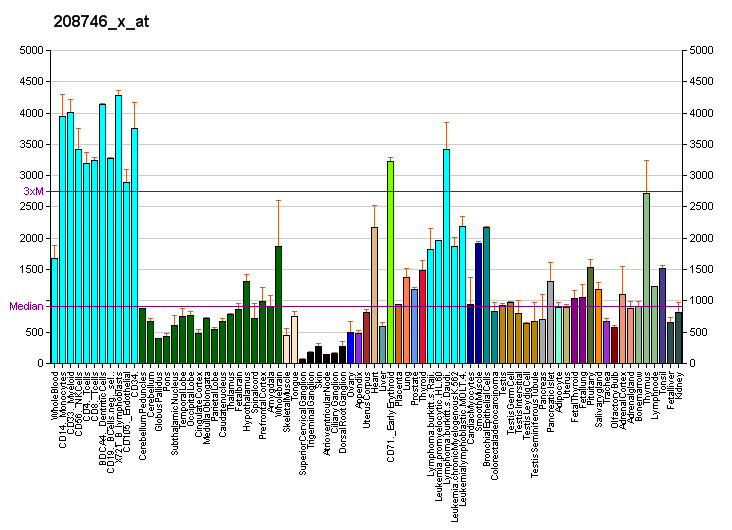

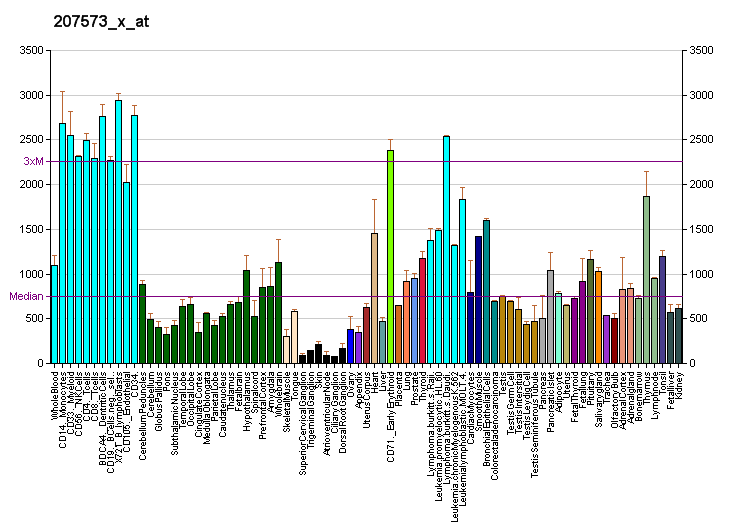

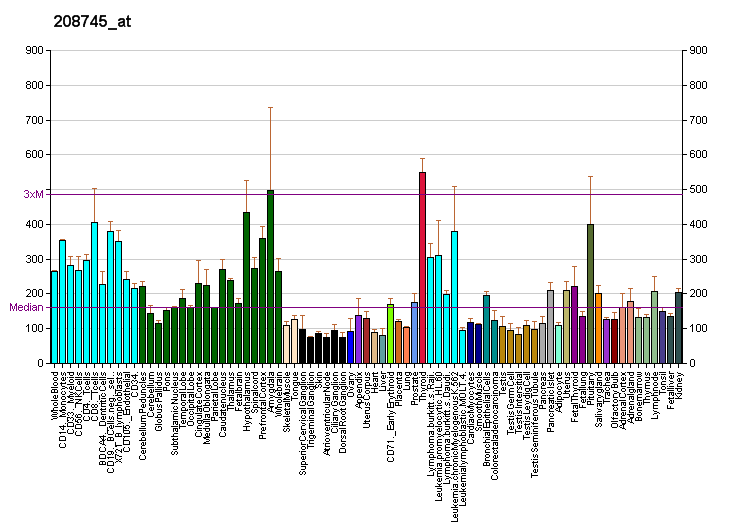
RNA expression pattern
Bgee	Human / Mouse (ortholog); Top expressed in: ganglionic eminence; left ventricle; mucosa of transverse colon; bone marrow cell; right auricle of heart; renal medulla; apex of heart; right ventricle; myocardium of left ventricle; left adrenal gland / Top expressed in: quadriceps femoris muscle; skeletal muscle tissue; right kidney; heart; muscle of thigh; yolk sac; stomach; proximal tubule; dentate gyrus of hippocampal formation granule cell; neural tube; More reference expression data
BioGPS	More reference expression data
Gene ontology
Molecular function	ATPase activity; transmembrane transporter activity; proton transmembrane transporter activity; proton-transporting ATP synthase activity, rotational mechanism
Cellular component	mitochondrial inner membrane; mitochondrial proton-transporting ATP synthase complex; mitochondrion; membrane; proton-transporting ATP synthase complex, coupling factor F(o); mitochondrial proton-transporting ATP synthase complex, coupling factor F(o)
Biological process	mitochondrial ATP synthesis coupled proton transport; ion transport; ATP biosynthetic process; ATP synthesis coupled proton transport; cristae formation
Sources:Amigo / QuickGO
Orthologs
Databases	NCBI: entry; OMA: entry
Species	Human	Mouse
Entrez	10632	27425
Ensembl	ENSG00000167283	ENSMUSG00000038717
UniProt	O75964	Q9CPQ8
RefSeq (mRNA)	NM_006476	NM_013795
RefSeq (protein)	NP_006467	NP_038823
Location (UCSC)	Chr 11: 118.4 – 118.43 Mb	Chr 9: 44.82 – 44.83 Mb
PubMed search
- Wikidata
View/Edit Human	View/Edit Mouse

ATP-synt_G

Identifiers
- Symbol: ATP-synt_G
- Pfam: PF04718
- InterPro: IPR006808
Available protein structures:
- PDB: IPR006808 PF04718 (ECOD; PDBsum)
- AlphaFold: IPR006808; PF04718

ATP synthase subunit g, mitochondrial is an enzyme that in humans is encoded by the ATP5MG gene.

Mitochondrial ATP synthase catalyzes ATP synthesis, utilizing an electrochemical gradient of protons across the inner membrane during oxidative phosphorylation. It is composed of two linked multi-subunit complexes: the soluble catalytic core, F1, and the membrane-spanning component, Fo, which comprises the proton channel. The F1 complex consists of 5 different subunits (alpha, beta, gamma, delta, and epsilon) assembled in a ratio of 3 alpha, 3 beta, and a single representative of the other 3. The Fo seems to have nine subunits (a, b, c, d, e, f, g, F6 and 8). This gene encodes the g subunit of the F0 complex.

The function of subunit G is currently unknown. There is no counterpart in chloroplast or bacterial F-ATPases identified so far.
