= Halanaerobiales =

Scientific classification
- Domain: Bacteria
- Kingdom: Bacillati
- Phylum: Bacillota
- Class: Clostridia
- Order: Halanaerobiales corrig. Rainey and Zhilina 1995

Families
- Acetohalobiaceae; Halanaerobiaceae; Halarsenatibacteraceae; Halobacteroidaceae; Halothermotrichaceae

Synonyms
- Halobacteroidales Chuvochina et al. 2024

Order of bacteria

The Halanaerobiales are an order of bacteria placed within the class Clostridia, and encompassing two families, the Halanaerobiaceae and the Halobacteroidaceae. Originally placed within the highly polyphyletic class Clostridia, according to the NCBI and LPSN, it is now thought to lie outside the Bacillota. Halanaerobiales are halophilic obligate anaerobes with a fermentative or homoacetogenic metabolism.

== Phylogeny ==
The currently accepted taxonomy is based on the List of Prokaryotic names with Standing in Nomenclature (LPSN) and National Center for Biotechnology Information (NCBI).

16S rRNA based LTP_10_2024

- - - "Anoxybacteraceae"
      Anoxybacter
  - - Halanaerobiaceae
      - Halarsenatibacter
      - - Halothermothrix
        - - Halocella corrig. Simankova et al. 1994
          - Halanaerobium
    - Halobacteroidaceae
      - - - Acetohalobium
          - Sporohalobacter
        - - Fuchsiella
          - Selenihalanaerobacter
      - - - - Halanaerobaculum Hedi et al. 2009
            - Halobacteroides
          - Halanaerobacter
        - - Natroniella
          - Orenia (incl. Halonatronum)

120 marker proteins based GTDB 10-RS226

- - - "Anoxybacterales"
      - "Anoxybacteraceae"
        Anoxybacter Zeng et al. 2015
  - - Halanaerobiales
      - - DTU029
          Iocasia Zhang et al. 2025
        - Halothermotrichaceae
          Halothermothrix Cayol et al. 1994
      - - Halarsenatibacteraceae
          - Halarsenatibacter Switzer Blum et al. 2010
          - Halonatronomonas Detkova, Boltyanskaya & Kevbrin 2023
        - Halanaerobiaceae
          Halanaerobium corrig. Zeikus et al. 1984
    - Halobacteroidales
      - Acetohalobiaceae
        - Fuchsiella Zhilina et al. 2012
        - - - "Ca.Frackibacter" Daly et al. 2016
            - Selenihalanaerobacter Switzer Blum et al. 2001
          - - Acetohalobium Zhilina and Zavarzin 1990
            - Sporohalobacter Oren et al. 1988
      - Halobacteroidaceae
        - Natroniella Zhilina et al. 1996
        - - - Halonatronum Zhilina et al. 2001
            - Orenia Rainey & Stackebrandt 1995
          - - Halobacteroides Oren et al. 1984
            - Halanaerobacter corrig. Liaw & Mah 1996

- Unassigned Halanaerobiales:
  - "Candidatus Natronospora" Sorokin, Merkel & Khizhniak 2025
- Unassigned Halobacteroidaceae:
  - Halanaerocella Gales et al. 2025

== See also ==
- List of bacterial orders
- List of bacteria genera
