= NT5C =

Protein-coding gene in humans

Identifiers
- Aliases: NT5C, DNT, DNT1, HEL74, P5N2, PN-I, PN-II, UMPH2, cdN, dNT-1, 5', 3'-nucleotidase, cytosolic
- External IDs: OMIM: 191720; MGI: 1354954; GeneCards: NT5C
Available structures
PDB	Ortholog search: PDBe RCSB
PDB	List of PDB id codes 2I7D, 4L57, 4YIH

Gene location (Human)
Chr.	Chromosome 17 (human)
Band	17q25.1	Start	75,130,225 bp
Band	17q25.1	End	75,131,757 bp

Gene location (Mouse)
Chr.	Chromosome 11 (mouse)
Band	11|11 E2	Start	115,381,246 bp
Band	11|11 E2	End	115,382,688 bp
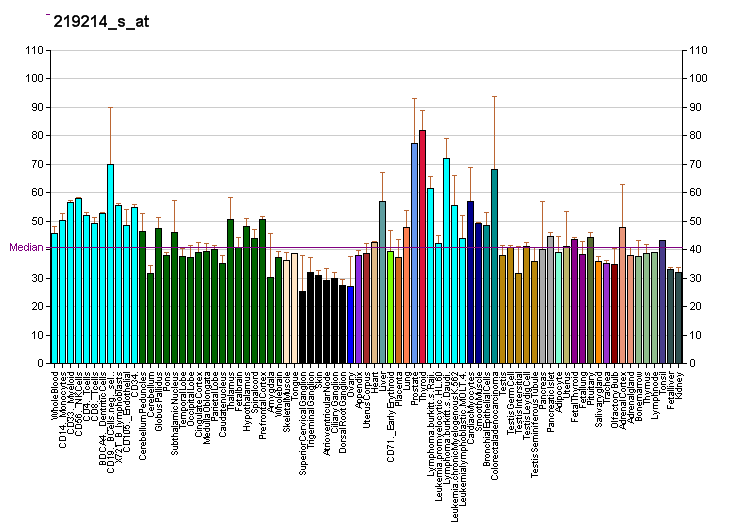
RNA expression pattern
Bgee	Human / Mouse (ortholog); Top expressed in: mucosa of transverse colon; right uterine tube; granulocyte; gastric mucosa; olfactory zone of nasal mucosa; left ovary; right lobe of thyroid gland; right ovary; ectocervix; body of stomach / Top expressed in: left colon; epithelium of small intestine; thymus; duodenum; crypt of lieberkuhn of small intestine; ileum; adrenal gland; morula; endothelial cell of lymphatic vessel; jejunum; More reference expression data
BioGPS	More reference expression data
Gene ontology
Molecular function	nucleotide binding; 5'-nucleotidase activity; pyrimidine nucleotide binding; phosphatase activity; metal ion binding; nucleotidase activity; hydrolase activity
Cellular component	cytoplasm; mitochondrion; extracellular exosome; nucleus; cytosol
Biological process	pyrimidine deoxyribonucleotide catabolic process; purine nucleotide catabolic process; nucleotide metabolic process; pyrimidine nucleoside catabolic process; deoxyribonucleotide catabolic process; dephosphorylation
Sources:Amigo / QuickGO
Orthologs
Databases	NCBI: entry; OMA: entry
Species	Human	Mouse
Entrez	30833	50773
Ensembl	ENSG00000125458	ENSMUSG00000020736
UniProt	Q8TCD5	Q9JM14
RefSeq (mRNA)	NM_001252377; NM_014595	NM_015807
RefSeq (protein)	NP_001239306; NP_055410	NP_056622
Location (UCSC)	Chr 17: 75.13 – 75.13 Mb	Chr 11: 115.38 – 115.38 Mb
PubMed search
- Wikidata
View/Edit Human	View/Edit Mouse

5', 3'-nucleotidase, cytosolic, also known as 5'(3')-deoxyribonucleotidase, cytosolic type (cdN) or deoxy-5'-nucleotidase 1 (dNT-1), is an enzyme that in humans is encoded by the NT5C gene on chromosome 17.

This gene encodes a nucleotidase that catalyzes the dephosphorylation of the 5' deoxyribonucleotides (dNTP) and 2'(3')-dNTP and ribonucleotides, but not 5' ribonucleotides. Of the different forms of nucleotidases characterized, this enzyme is unique in its preference for 5'-dNTP. It may be one of the enzymes involved in regulating the size of dNTP pools in cells. Alternatively spliced transcript variants have been found for this gene. [provided by RefSeq, Nov 2011]

== Structure ==
cdN is one of seven 5' nucleotidases identified in humans, all of which differ in tissue specificity, subcellular location, primary structure and substrate specificity. Of the seven, the mitochondrial counterpart of cdN, mdN, is the most closely related to cdN. Their genes, NT5M and NT5C, share the same exon/intron organization, and their amino acid sequences are 52% identical. Both cdN and mdN share nearly identical catalytic phosphate binding sites with most members of the haloacid dehalogenase (HAD) superfamily.

This enzyme forms a 45-kDa homodimer of two 22-kDa subunits composed of a core domain and cap domain. The core domain is an α/β Rossmann-like fold containing six antiparallel β-strands surrounded by α-helixes, and it spans residues 1-17 and 77-201 of the amino acid sequence. The cap domain is a 4-helix bundle spanning residues 18-76. The cleft formed by the core and cap domains acts as the enzyme's active site, where three conserved motifs in the core domain plus the cofactor Mg2+ serve as the substrate binding site. Meanwhile, the residues Phe18, Phe44, Leu45, and Tyr65 in the cap domain form an aromatic, hydrophobic pocket that coordinates with the base of the nucleotide substrate and, thus, influences the enzyme's substrate specificity. Its two main chain amides form hydrogen bonds with the 4-carbonyl group of dUMP and dTMP and with the 6-carbonyl group of dGMP and dIMP, while repelling the 4-amino group of dCMP and dAMP. The residue Asp43 is responsible for donating a proton to O5' of the nucleotide during catalysis.

== Function ==
This enzyme functions in dephosphorylating nucleoside triphosphates, especially the 5′- and 2′(3′)-phosphates of uracil and thymine, as well as inosine and guanine, dNTPs (dUMPs, dTMPs, dIMPs, and dGMPs, respectively). Due to this function, cdN regulates the size of dNTP pools in cells, in conjunction with the cytosolic thymidine kinases, as part of the dNTP substrate cycle.

The enzyme is ubiquitously expressed, though lymphoid cells display particularly high cdN activity.

== Clinical significance ==
The protein cdN is essential to counteract accumulation of cellular dNTPs, as excess dNTPs have been linked to genetic disease. In addition, this enzyme's dephosphorylation function could be applied to anticancer and antiviral treatments which use nucleoside analogs. These treatments rely on the kinase activation of the analogs, which then are incorporated into the DNA of the tumor cell or virus to act as DNA chain terminators. cdN can be used to maintain the concentrations of nucleoside analogs at low levels to avoid cytotoxicity.

Moreover, cdN may affect the sensitivity of acute myeloid leukemia (AML) patients to treatment with ara-C. as low cdN mRNA levels in leukemic blasts have been correlated with a worse clinical outcome.

== Interactions ==
cdN binds and dephosphorylates deoxyribonucleotides such as uracil, thymine, inosine, and guanine.

== See also ==
- NT5M
