= NT5M =

Protein-coding gene in the species Homo sapiens

Identifiers
- Aliases: NT5M, dNT-2, dNT2, mdN, 5',3'-nucleotidase, mitochondrial
- External IDs: OMIM: 605292; MGI: 1917127; GeneCards: NT5M
Available structures
PDB	Ortholog search: PDBe RCSB
PDB	List of PDB id codes 1MH9, 1Q91, 1Q92, 1Z4I, 1Z4J, 1Z4K, 1Z4L, 1Z4M, 1Z4P, 1Z4Q, 2JAU, 2JAW, 4L6A, 4L6C, 4MUM, 4MWO, 4NFL, 4YIK

Gene location (Human)
Chr.	Chromosome 17 (human)
Band	17p11.2	Start	17,303,335 bp
Band	17p11.2	End	17,347,663 bp

Gene location (Mouse)
Chr.	Chromosome 11 (mouse)
Band	11|11 B1.3	Start	59,730,273 bp
Band	11|11 B1.3	End	59,771,794 bp
RNA expression pattern
Bgee	Human / Mouse (ortholog); Top expressed in: monocyte; gonad; apex of heart; muscle of thigh; right frontal lobe; anterior cingulate cortex; gastrocnemius muscle; testicle; left testis; right testis / Top expressed in: spermatocyte; interventricular septum; seminiferous tubule; spermatid; dentate gyrus of hippocampal formation granule cell; facial motor nucleus; visual cortex; primary visual cortex; nucleus of stria terminalis; right kidney; More reference expression data
BioGPS	n/a
Gene ontology
Molecular function	nucleotide binding; nucleotidase activity; 5'-nucleotidase activity; hydrolase activity; metal ion binding
Cellular component	mitochondrial matrix; mitochondrion
Biological process	pyrimidine deoxyribonucleotide catabolic process; DNA replication; dUMP catabolic process; deoxyribonucleotide catabolic process; nucleotide metabolic process; pyrimidine nucleoside catabolic process; dephosphorylation
Sources:Amigo / QuickGO
Orthologs
Databases	NCBI: entry; OMA: entry
Species	Human	Mouse
Entrez	56953	103850
Ensembl	ENSG00000205309	ENSMUSG00000032615
UniProt	Q9NPB1	Q8VCE6
RefSeq (mRNA)	NM_020201	NM_134029
RefSeq (protein)	NP_064586	NP_598790
Location (UCSC)	Chr 17: 17.3 – 17.35 Mb	Chr 11: 59.73 – 59.77 Mb
PubMed search
- Wikidata
View/Edit Human	View/Edit Mouse

5',3'-nucleotidase, mitochondrial, also known as 5'(3')-deoxyribonucleotidase, mitochondrial (mdN) or deoxy-5'-nucleotidase 2 (dNT-2), is an enzyme that in humans is encoded by the NT5M gene. This gene encodes a 5' nucleotidase that localizes to the mitochondrial matrix. This enzyme dephosphorylates the 5'- and 2'(3')-phosphates of uracil and thymine deoxyribonucleotides. The gene is located within the Smith–Magenis syndrome region on chromosome 17.

== Structure ==
The cDNA of mdN encodes a 25.9-kDa polypeptide, and the crystal structure of this enzymes reveals a 196-long amino acid sequence in the mature protein. The first 32 amino acids, which contain the mitochondrial targeting sequence, are removed during the processing of the premature protein for its import into the mitochondrial matrix. The enzyme is likely a dimer protein formed by the interaction of alpha and beta loops between the cores of the two monomers. Each monomer is composed of a large and small domain connected by two loops. The large domain forms an alpha/beta Rossmann fold as well as 2 helix loops in the fold, whereas the small domain forms a truncated four-helix bundle which is inserted between a beta strand and alpha-helix in the large domain. The active site is found in a cleft between the two domains and binds a magnesium ion that is coordinated by three exogenous ligands, a phosphate ion, and two water molecules in an octahedral shape.

mdN is one of seven 5' nucleotidases identified in humans, all of which differ in tissue specificity, subcellular location, primary structure and substrate specificity. Of the seven, the cytosolic counterpart of mdN, cdN, is the most closely related to mdN. Their genes, NT5M and NT5C, share the same exon/intron organization, and their amino acid sequences are 52% identical. In addition, mdN structurally resembles members of the HAD family despite no significant sequence similarity.

== Function ==
This enzyme functions in dephosphorylating nucleoside triphosphates, especially the 5′- and 2′(3′)-phosphates of uracil and thymine deoxyribonucleotides (dUMPs and dTMPs). Due to this function, mdN regulates the size of pyrimidine deoxyribonucleotide pools within mitochondria, in conjunction with the mitochondrial thymidine kinase, as part of the thymidine (dTTP)/dTMP substrate cycle. Since excess dTTP leads to aberrant mitochondrial DNA replication, the regulatory role of mdN serves to maintain dTTP levels to ensure proper mitochondrial DNA replication.

Similar to other mitochondrial enzymes, mdN mRNA is found in heart, brain, and muscle, and to a lesser degree in kidney and pancreas, while it is absent from placenta, liver, and lung. Though the enzyme is ubiquitous, mdN activity has only been detected in brain and heart tissue.

== Clinical significance ==
Since the NT5M gene is located in the Smith–Magenis syndrome region of chromosome 17, mutations in this gene could contribute to the disease. Moreover, its location may indicate that the disease involves a mitochondrial component. The protein mdN is essential to counteract dTTP accumulation, as excess dTTP has been linked to mitochondrial genetic disease. In addition, this enzyme's dephosphorylation function could be applied to anticancer and antiviral treatments which use nucleoside analogs. These treatments rely on the kinase activation of the analogs, which then are incorporated into the DNA of the tumor cell or virus to act as DNA chain terminators. mdN can be used to maintain the concentrations of nucleoside analogs at low levels to avoid mitochondrial toxicity. Thus, only analogs whose 5' phosphates are rapidly and specifically degraded by mdN should be used.

== Interactions ==
mdN binds and dephosphorylates uracil and thymine deoxyribonucleotides.

== See also ==
- NT5C
