= 5-Methyluridine triphosphate =

Chemical compound

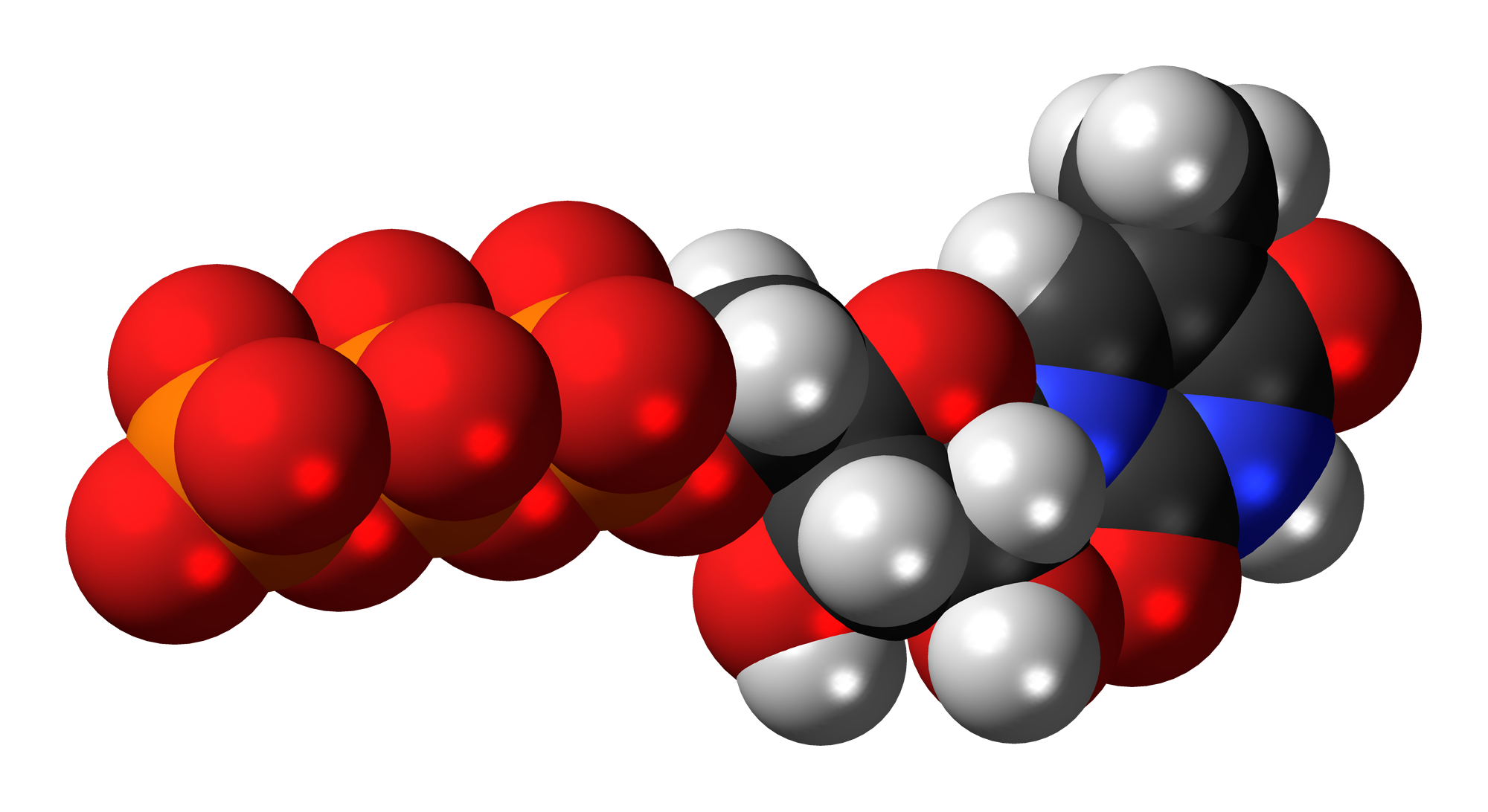

Identifiers
- IUPAC name: [(2R,3S,5R)-3-hydroxy-5-(5-methyl-2,4-dioxopyrimidin-1-yl)oxolan-2-yl]methyl (hydroxy-phosphonooxyphosphoryl) hydrogen phosphate
- CAS Number: 23198-01-8
- PubChem CID: 451388
- ChemSpider: 397621
- UNII: 26L4U23SYM
- ChEMBL: ChEMBL607677
- CompTox Dashboard (EPA): DTXSID001303289

Chemical and physical data
- Formula: C_{10}H_{17}N_{2}O_{15}P_{3}
- Molar mass: 498.166 g·mol^{−1}
- 3D model (JSmol): Interactive image
- SMILES: CC1=CN(C(=O)NC1=O)[C@H]2[C@@H]([C@@H]([C@H](O2)COP(=O)(O)OP(=O)(O)OP(=O)(O)O)O)O
- InChI: InChI=1S/C10H17N2O15P3/c1-4-2-12(10(16)11-8(4)15)9-7(14)6(13)5(25-9)3-24-29(20,21)27-30(22,23)26-28(17,18)19/h2,5-7,9,13-14H,3H2,1H3,(H,20,21)(H,22,23)(H,11,15,16)(H2,17,18,19)/t5-,6-,7-,9-/m1/s1; Key:RZCIEJXAILMSQK-JXOAFFINSA-N

5-Methyluridine triphosphate or m^{5}UTP is one of five nucleoside triphosphates. It is the ribonucleoside triphosphate of thymidine, but the nomenclature with "5-methyluridine" is used because the term thymidine triphosphate is used for the deoxyribonucleoside by convention.
