= DCMP kinase =

dCMP kinase may refer to:

- (d)CMP kinase, an enzyme
- Cytidylate kinase, an enzyme
