= Methyluridine =

Methyluridine may refer to:

- 3-Methyluridine
- 5-Methyluridine
