= Cell synchronization =

Cell synchronization is a process by which cells in a culture at different stages of the cell cycle are brought to the same phase. Cell synchrony is a vital process in the study of cells progressing through the cell cycle as it allows population-wide data to be collected rather than relying solely on single-cell experiments. The types of synchronization are broadly categorized into two groups; physical fractionization and chemical blockade.

== Physical Separation ==
Physical fractionation is a process by which continuously dividing cells are separated into phase-enriched populations based on characteristics such as the following:

- Cell density.
- Cell size
- The presence of cell surface epitopes marked by antibodies
- Light scatter
- Fluorescent emission by labeled cells.

Given that cells take on varying morphologies and surface markers throughout the cell cycle, these traits can be used to separate by phase. There are two commonly used methods.

=== Centrifugal Elutriation ===
(Previously called: counter streaming centrifugation) Centrifugal elutriation can be used to separate cells in different phases of the cell cycle based on their size and sedimentation velocity (related to sedimentation coefficient). Because of the consistent growth patterns throughout the cell cycle, centrifugal elutriation can separate cells into G1, S, G2, and M phases by increasing size (and increasing sedimentation coefficients) with diminished resolution between G2 and M phases due to cellular heterogeneity and lack of a distinct size change.

Larger cells sediment faster, so a cell in G2, which has experienced more growth time, will sediment faster than a cell in G1 and can therefore be fractionated out. Cells grown in suspension tend to be easier to elutriate given that they do not adhere to one another and have rounded, uniform shapes. However, some types of adherent cells can be treated with trypsin and resuspended for elutriation as they will assume a more rounded shape in suspension.

=== Flow Cytometry and Cell Sorting ===
Flow cytometry allows for detection, counting, and measurement of the physical and chemical properties of cells. Cells are suspended in fluid and put through the flow cytometer. Cells are sent one at a time through a laser beam and the light scatter is measured by a detector. Cells or their components can be labeled with fluorescent markers so that they emit different wavelengths of light in response to the laser, allowing for additional data collection.

For quantitative cell cycle analysis, cells are usually fixed with ethanol and stained with DNA-binding dyes like propidium iodide, Hoechst 33342, DAPI, 7-Aminoactinomysin D, Mithramycin, DRAQ5, or TO-PRO-3, allowing for determination of phase by DNA quantity. However, if these cells have been fixed, they are dead and cannot be maintained for continued growth. Cells can also be resuspended in media and dyed with non-toxic dyes to maintain living cultures. Cells can also be genome edited such that some cellular proteins are made with conjugated fluorescent tags such as GFP, mCherry, and Luciferase that can be used to detect and quantify those components. For example, chimeric histone H2B-GFP constructs can be made and used to measure DNA content and determine replication status as a means of discerning cell phase. Light scatter measurements can be used to determine characteristics like size, allowing for distinction of cell phase without tagging.

Flow cytometers can be used to collect multiparameter cytometry data, but cannot be used to separate or purify cells. Fluorescence-activated cell sorting (FACS) is a technique for sorting out the cells based on the differences that can be detected by light scatter (e.g. cell size) or fluorescence emission (by penetrated DNA, RNA, proteins or antigens). The system works much like flow cytometry, but will also charge each cell droplet after it has been measured based on a defined parameter. The charged droplet will then encounter an electrostatic deflection system that will sort the cell to a different container based on that charge. This allows cells to be separated on the basis of fluorescent content or scatter.

To summarize, flow cytometry alone can be used to gather quantitative data about cell cycle phase distribution, but flow cytometry in coordination with FACS can be used to gather quantitative data and separate cells by phase for further study. Limitations include:

- for light scatter measurements, poor resolution between G2 and M (as with centrifugal elutriation)
- for fixed cells, unable to maintain living cultures
- for unfixed but dyed cells, possible disruption or mutagenesis of cells because of dye treatment
- some population heterogeneity may be maintained, as size separation may not always be accurate for measuring phase and not all cells may be at the same point within each phase (early G1 vs late G1)
- for DNA-edited cells, the process may take an extended period of time

== Chemical blockade ==
The addition of exogenous substrates can be used to block cells in certain phases of the cell cycle and frequently target cell cycle checkpoints. These techniques can be carried out in vitro and do not require removal from the culture environment. The most common type of chemical blockade is arrest-and-release, which involves treatment of a culture with a chemical block and subsequent release by washing or addition of a neutralizing agent for the block. While chemical blockade is typically more effective and precise than physical separation, some methods can be imperfect for various reasons, including:

- the proportion of synchronized cells is insufficient
- chemical manipulations may disrupt cellular function and/or kill a portion of cells
- the treatment is toxic and not applicable in vivo (only relevant if considering clinical application)

=== Arrest in M ===
Mitotic arrest can be achieved through many methods and at various points within M-phase, including the G2/M transition, the metaphase/anaphase transition, and mitotic exit.

==== Nocodazole ====
Nocodazole is a rapidly-reversible inhibitor of microtubule polymerization that can be used to arrest cells before Anaphase at the spindle assembly checkpoint in the metaphase/anaphase transition. The microtubule poison works by blocking the formation of the mitotic spindles that attach to and pull apart sister chromatids in dividing cells. Cells will remain arrested until the nocodazole has been washed out. Nocodazole does not appear to disrupt interphase metabolism, and released cells return to normal cell cycle progression. Because microtubules are vital in other cellular functions, sustained use of nocodazole can result in disruption of those functions, causing cell death.

==== Inhibition of CDK1 ====
CDK1 is necessary for the transition from G2 to M phase. RO-3306 is a selective CDK1 inhibitor that can reversibly arrest cells at the G2/M border. RO-3306 synchronized >95% of cycling cells (including cancer cells), and released cells rapidly enter mitosis.

==== Roscovitine ====
Roscovitine can be used to inhibit the activity of cyclin-dependent kinases (CDKs) by competing with ATP in the ATP-binding region of the kinase. Its effects are potent, arresting cells by knocking down the function of CDKs necessary for cell cycle progression. Roscovitine can be used to arrest cells in G0/G1, G1/S, or G2/M transitions.

==== Colchicine ====
Colchicine arrests cells in metaphase and is a microtubule poison preventing mitotic spindle formation, much like nocodazole. It works by depolymerizing tubulin in microtubules, blocking progression to anaphase through sustained arrest at the spindle assembly checkpoint.

=== Arrest in S (G1/S arrest) ===
Arrest in S phase typically involves inhibition of DNA synthesis as the genome is being replicated. Most methods are reversible through washing.

==== Double thymidine block ====
High concentrations of thymidine interrupt the deoxynucleotide metabolism pathway through competitive inhibition, thus blocking DNA replication. A single treatment with thymidine arrests cells throughout S phase, so a double treatment acts to induce a more uniform block in early S phase. The process begins with a treatment with thymidine, washing of the culture, followed by another thymidine treatment.

==== Hydroxyurea ====
Hydroxyurea decreases the production of dNTPs by inhibiting the enzyme ribonucleotide reductase. This serves to halt DNA synthesis by depriving DNA polymerase of dNTPs at replication forks. Hydroxyurea is also used to treat certain types of cancer and blood disorders.

==== Aphidicolin ====
Aphidocolin is a fungus-derived tetracyclic diterpenoid that acts as a selective inhibitor for DNA polymerase α. This enzyme is necessary for replicative DNA synthesis, but does not disrupt DNA repair synthesis or mitochondrial DNA replication.

=== Arrest in G1 ===
A single commonly used chemical method exists for synchronization of cells in G1. It involves Lovastatin, a reversible competitive inhibitor of 3-hydroxy-3-methylglutaryl-coenzyme A reductase, an enzyme vital in the production of mevalonic acid. Mevalonic acid is a key intermediate in the mevalonate pathway responsible for synthesis of cholesterol. Addition of cholesterol to Lovastatin-treated cells does not undo the arrest affect, so Lovastatin appears to inhibit the formation of some early intermediate in the pathway that is essential for progression through early G1.

== Other Methods of Synchronization ==
=== Mitotic Selection ===
Mitotic selection is a drug-free procedure for the selection of mitotic cells from a monolayer undergoing exponential growth. During mitosis, cells undergo changes in morphology, and mitotic selection takes advantage of this in adherent cells grown in a monolayer. The cells become more spherical, decreasing the surface area of cell membrane attached to the culture plate. Mitotic cells can therefore be completely detached by gently shaking and collected from the supernatant.

=== Nutrient/Serum Deprivation ===
Elimination of serum from the culture medium for about 24 hours results in the accumulation of cells at the transition between G_{0} quiescence and early G1. This arrest is easily reversible through addition of serum or the deprived nutrient. Upon release, progression through the cell cycle is variable, as some cells remain quiescent while others proceed through the cell cycle at variable rates.

=== Contact Inhibition ===
Contact inhibition occurs when cells are allowed to grow to high or full confluence, maximizing cell-to-cell contact. This triggers arrest in early G1 in normal cells. Arrest is reversed by replating cells at a lower density. Because of the proliferation-promoting mutations intrinsic to cancer, tumor cell lines are not usually able to undergo contact inhibition, though there are exceptions.
