= C10H14N2O6 =

The molecular formula C_{10}H_{14}N_{2}O_{6} (molar mass: 258.23 g/mol) may refer to:

- 3-Methyluridine, also called N3-methyluridine
- 5-Methyluridine, also called ribothymidine
