= Nucleoside oxidase =

Identifiers
- EC no.: 1.1.3.28
- CAS no.: 82599-71-1

Databases
- IntEnz: IntEnz view
- BRENDA: BRENDA entry
- ExPASy: NiceZyme view
- KEGG: KEGG entry
- MetaCyc: metabolic pathway
- PRIAM: profile
- PDB structures: RCSB PDB PDBe PDBsum
Search
- PMC: articles
- PubMed: articles
- NCBI: proteins

Nucleoside oxidase (EC 1.1.3.28) is an enzyme with systematic name nucleoside:oxygen 5'-oxidoreductase. This enzyme catalyses the following two chemical reactions

Two inosine
O_{2}
2 H_{2}O
O_{2}
2 H_{2}O
Two 5'-dehydroinosine
Two 5'-dehydroinosine
O_{2}
O_{2}
Two 9-riburonosylhypoxanthine

As a result, inosine is converted to 9-riburonosylhypoxanthine. This enzyme can use other purine and pyrimidine nucleosides (as well as 2'-deoxynucleosides) as substrates.
