= Deoxycytidylate kinase =

Deoxycytidylate kinase may refer to one of two enzymes:

- (d)CMP kinase, an enzyme
- Cytidylate kinase, an enzyme
