= Doxecitine/doxribtimine =

Combination medication

- Doxecitine (top) and doxribtimine (bottom)

Combination of
- Doxecitine: Pyrimidine nucleoside
- Doxribtimine: Pyrimidine nucleoside

Clinical data
- Trade names: Kygevvi
- AHFS/Drugs.com: Monograph
- MedlinePlus: a626010
- License data: US DailyMed: Doxecitine and doxribtimine
- ATC code: A16AX29 (WHO)

Legal status
- Legal status: US: ℞-only; EU: Rx-only

Identifiers
- KEGG: D13205

Doxecitine/doxribtimine, sold under the brand name Kygevvi, is a fixed-dose combination medication used for the treatment of thymidine kinase 2 deficiency. It contains the pyrimidine nucleosides, doxecitine (deoxycytidine) and doxribtimine (thymidine).

The most common side effects include diarrhea, vomiting, increase in liver enzymes, and abdominal pain.

Doxecitine/doxribtimine was approved for medical use in the United States in November 2025. The US Food and Drug Administration considers it to be a first-in-class medication.

== Medical uses ==
Doxecitine/doxribtimine is indicated for the treatment of thymidine kinase 2 deficiency in people with an age of symptom onset on or before twelve years of age.

Thymidine kinase 2 deficiency is a rare, inherited genetic disorder that affects the body's ability to produce and repair mitochondrial DNA. Conditions that cause low levels of mitochondrial DNA, including thymidine kinase 2 deficiency, can be called mitochondrial depletion syndromes. Symptoms of thymidine kinase 2 deficiency can include muscle weakness and respiratory (breathing) failure. While the exact frequency of thymidine kinase 2 deficiency is not known, it is considered very rare. Approximately 120 people have been described in the medical literature, although the condition may be underdiagnosed.

== Side effects ==
The most common side effects include diarrhea, vomiting, increase in liver enzymes, and abdominal pain.

== Mechanism of action ==
Doxecitine (deoxycytidine) and doxribtimine (deoxythymidine) are used as deoxynucleoside therapies to treat thymidine kinase 2 (TK2) deficiency, a mitochondrial DNA depletion syndrome caused by mutations in the nuclear TK2 gene. These compounds act by supplying exogenous deoxycytidine (dC) and deoxythymidine (dT) respectively, facilitating mitochondrial DNA replication through alternative cytosolic enzymes such as thymidine kinase 1 (TK1) and deoxycytidine kinase (dCK). The therapy thus bypasses the dysfunctional mitochondrial TK2 enzyme, allowing restoration or preservation of mtDNA synthesis and cellular energy metabolism in patients with TK2 deficiency.

== History ==
The efficacy of doxecitine/doxribtimine to treat people with thymidine kinase 2 deficiency who start to show symptoms when they are twelve years of age or younger was established based on data from one phase II clinical study, two retrospective chart review studies, and an expanded access program. The survival in participants treated with doxecitine/doxribtimine was compared with the survival in an untreated external control group composed of untreated participants from published literature and one of the retrospective studies in this drug development program.

== Society and culture ==
=== Legal status ===
Doxecitine/doxribtimine was approved for medical use in the United States in November 2025.

In January 2026, the Committee for Medicinal Products for Human Use of the European Medicines Agency adopted a positive opinion, recommending the granting of a marketing authorization under exceptional circumstances for the medicinal product Kygevvi, intended for the treatment of adults and children with genetically confirmed thymidine kinase 2 deficiency with an age of symptom onset at or before twelve years of age. The applicant for this medicinal product is UCB Pharma S.A. Kygevvi was authorized for medical use in the European Union in March 2026.

=== Names ===
Doxecitine and doxribtimine are international nonproprietary names.

Doxecitine/doxribtimine is sold under the brand name Kygevvi.
