= DCK =

DCK may refer to:

- DCK, a 2007 album by Buckethead using the name Death Cube K
- Deschloroketamine, a dissociative anesthetic drug
- Deoxycytidine kinase, an enzyme
- DHA City Karachi, a planned city in Karachi, Pakistan
- Diamond Creek railway station, Melbourne
