= Cyanase =

cyanase
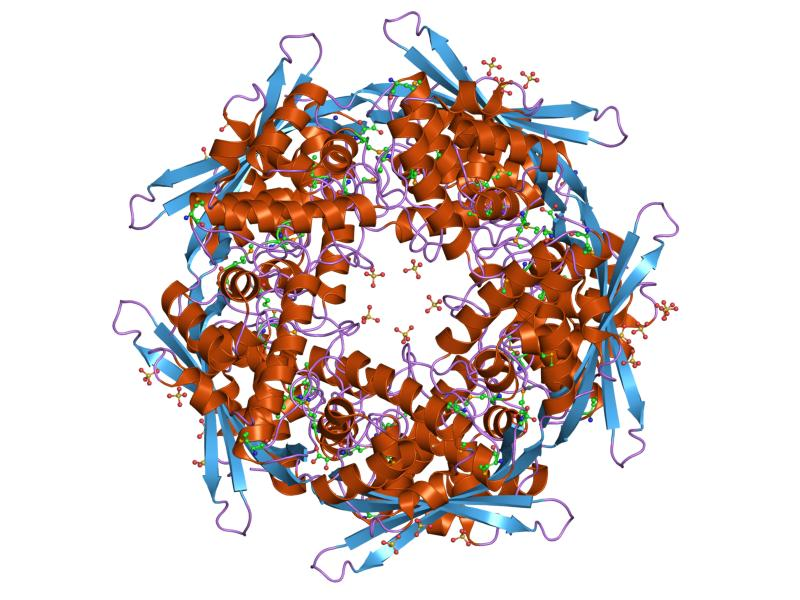
- Structure of the cyanase from E. coli with the di-anion oxalate bound at the enzyme active site

Identifiers
- EC no.: 4.2.1.104
- CAS no.: 37289-24-0

Databases
- BRENDA: enzyme data
- ExPASy: NiceZyme view
- KEGG: enzyme entry
- MetaCyc: metabolic pathway
- Rhea: reactions
- PDB structures: RCSB PDB PDBe PDBsum
- Gene Ontology: AmiGO / QuickGO
Search
- PMC: articles
- PubMed: articles
- NCBI: proteins

Cyanate lyase, C-terminal domain

Identifiers
- Symbol: Cyanate_lyase
- Pfam: PF02560
- InterPro: IPR003712
- SCOP2: 1dw9 / SCOPe / SUPFAM
- CDD: cd00559
Available protein structures:
- PDB: IPR003712 PF02560 (ECOD; PDBsum)
- AlphaFold: IPR003712; PF02560

The enzyme cyanase (EC 4.2.1.104, also known as cyanate hydratase or cyanate lyase), catalyses the bicarbonate dependent metabolism of cyanate to produce ammonia and carbon dioxide. The systematic name of this enzyme is carbamate hydrolyase. In E. coli, cyanase is an inducible enzyme and is encoded for by the cynS gene. Cyanate is a toxic anion, and cyanase catalyzes the metabolism into the benign products of carbon dioxide and ammonia.

== Reaction ==
Cyanase catalyzes the metabolic conversion of toxic cyanate to carbamate (H_{2}NCOO^{−}). The enzyme does this by first catalyzing the conversion of cyanate to carbamate, which then spontaneously decomposes to carbon dioxide and ammonia:

1. cyanate (OCN^{−}) + HCO_{3}^{−} + H^{+} $\rightleftharpoons$ carbamate (H_{2}NCOO^{−}) + CO_{2}
2. carbamate (H_{2}NCOO^{−}) + H^{+} $\rightleftharpoons$ NH_{3} + CO_{2} (spontaneous)

The resulting net reaction is:

cyanate (OCN^{−}) + HCO_{3}^{−} + 2 H^{+} $\rightleftharpoons$ NH_{3} + 2 CO_{2}

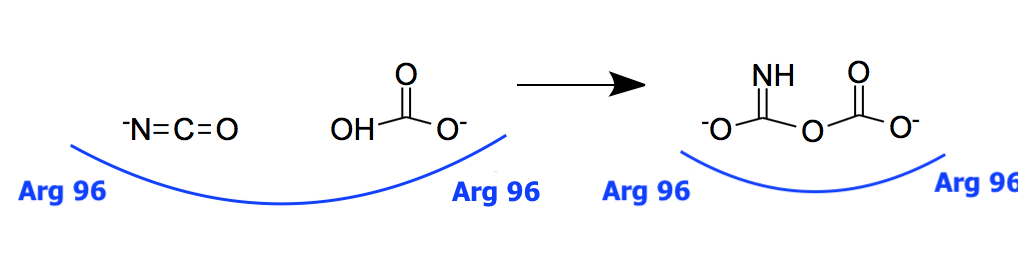
Cyanase enzyme catalyzes the reaction of bicarbonate and cyanate forming carbamate, to be rapidly decomposed into carbon dioxide and ammonia. The two adjacent anion binding sights signified by the catalytic Arg 96 residues on different monomers allow this reaction to occur in the pocket. Created on ChemDraw.

The kinetic mechanism is a rapid equilibrium where bicarbonate and cyanate both act as substrates. Bicarbonate acts a recycling substrate to cyanase in the production carbamate which then decomposes to complete the metabolism, rather than metabolism via a hydrolysis reaction as formerly believed.

Some bacteria can overcome the toxicity of environmental cyanate by degrading it via this enzyme. Cyanate hydratase is found in bacteria and plants.

== Structure ==
Cyanase is functionally active as a homodecamer, composed of 5 complexes of dimers. Each of these monomer subunits is 17 kDa and supports half-site binding of substrates. The cyanase monomer is composed of two domains. The N-terminal domain shows structural similarity to the DNA-binding alpha-helix bundle motif. The C-terminal domain has an 'open fold' with no structural homology to other proteins. The dimer structure reveals the C-terminal domains to be intertwined, and a decamer is formed by a pentamer of these dimers. The active site of the enzyme is located between dimers and is composed of residues from four adjacent subunits of the homodecamer.

A positively charged active site forms a pocket with two anion binding sites, bonded via ionic interaction. Positively charged amino acids that make up the protein help form this site between subunits. This adjacent anion binding site structure accommodates a complex of cyanate and bicarbonate, allowing the carbamate producing reaction to proceed.

Connecting these two domains in the monomer is the single cysteine residue. The disulfide bond links 156 amino acid units. Forming the larger complexes of the pentamer and decamer requires the presence of cyanate, or a substrate analog like azide. The final native enzyme complex is a complex of 5 dimers.

The crystallization of cyanase shows that cyanase crystals are triclinic with one homodecamer in the asymmetric unit.

The active site of cyanase accommodates two anions, bicarbonate and cyanate. Three catalytic residues, Arg96, Glu99, and Ser122, form this pocket that stabilizes the anions with ionic interactions. The positively charged and polar amino acid residues allow the active site to bind anions. The active site sits between dimers, noted by the Arg96 in each monomer to be in close proximity.

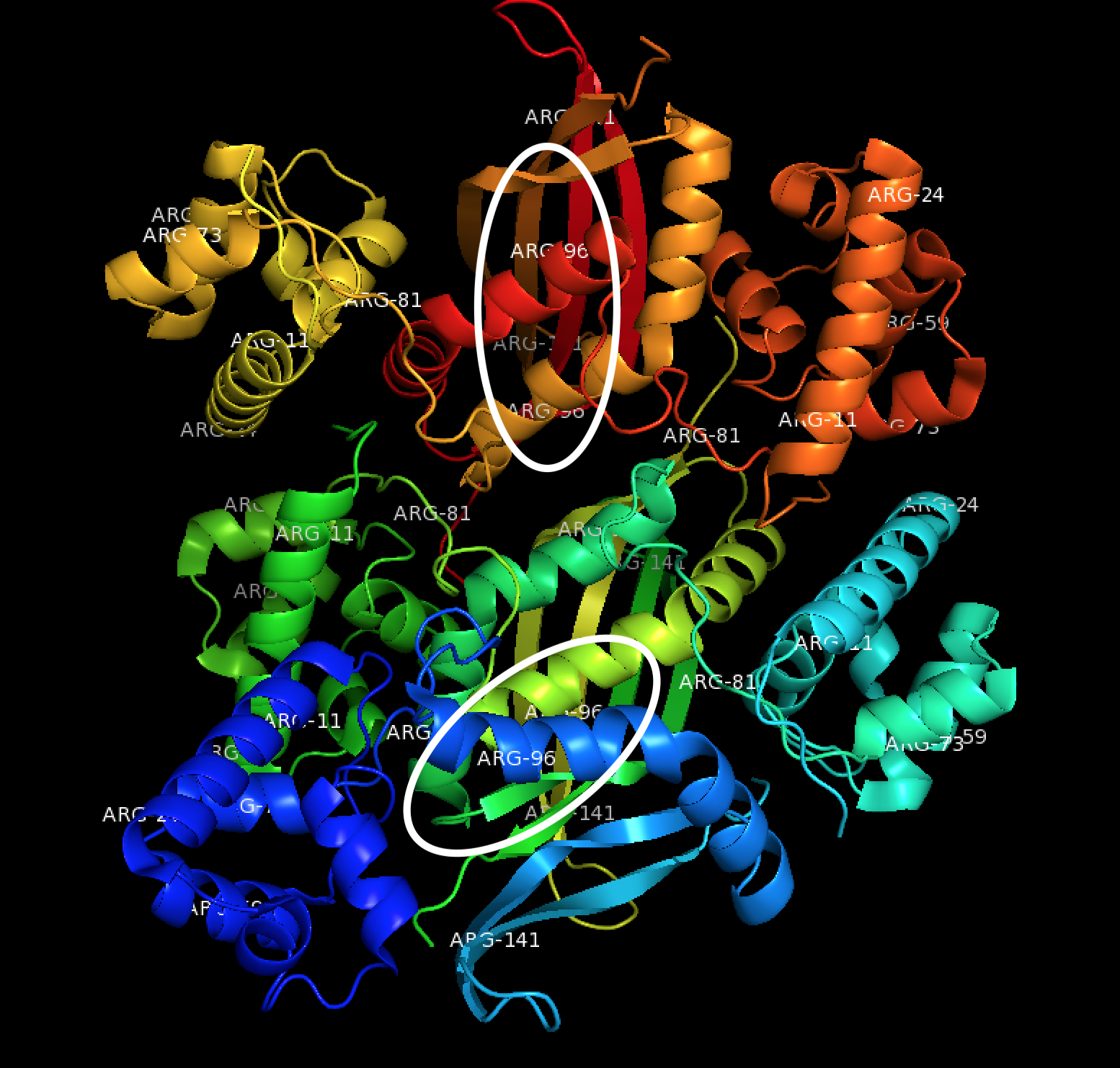
Cyanase pentamer with labeled arginine residues shown. Circles indicate active pockets where the 96th residues are arginines and provide a catalytic pocket for the enzyme mechanism to take place. Created in PyMol from http://www.rcsb.org/structure/6B6M.

The structure of cyanase has been shown to be similar in its prokaryotic and eukaryotic forms.

== Activity and regulation ==
Cyanase is regulated both transcriptionally and in its enzymatic activity. Transcription of cyanase is elevated with the presence of extracellular cyanate, a toxic ion, but also down regulated by the presence of excess arginine, the catalytic amino acid. Cyanase requires the product of the reaction catalyzed by cyanate permease. Activity of cyanase is also dependent on the concentration of its substrates, cyanate and bicarbonate.

Because bicarbonate is itself a recycling substrate and the kinetics of cyanase include a rapid and random equilibrium, bicarbonate can also act as an enzyme inhibitor. At low concentrations, bicarbonate shows uncompetitive inhibition, where it binds to the one of enzyme's anionic binding sites, and inhibit cyanate binding, or bicarbonate can bind once more so that the enzyme complex is bound to two bicarbonates in its double anion active site. At higher concentrations, the trend moves toward non-competitive inhibition, where the incorrect, dead-end complex must decompose to the initial separated units before the binding action can begin again.

This random equilibrium of cyanate and bicarbonate complexing with the enzyme causing substrate inhibition is referred to as ping pong inhibition.

== Functional Relevance ==
Cyanase is an important enzyme for plants and microbacteria as cyanate is a toxic substance that is prevalent in many environments. Further cyanase activity has been found to be encoded in cynH, a gene only found in marine cyanobacteria. There is a dodecapeptide, a partial region near the N-terminus of cyanate, that as a novel cationic α-helical antimicrobial peptide, known by CL 14-25.

Cyanase is also important as an energy metabolizer to fix Nitrogen in nitrifiers. Cyanate is an important source of reduced nitrogen in aquatic and terrestrial ecosystems, and although it is a toxic ion, it can be converted to ammonium and carbon dioxide by a cyanase enzyme, supplying energetic Nitrogen compounds to the organism. The activity of cyanase is heavily dependent on the present of bicarbonate, and to overcome this bottleneck, a combined application of cyanase and carbonic anhydrase has been used in a study.
