= Deoxycytidylate C-methyltransferase =

deoxycytidylate C-methyltransferase

Identifiers
- EC no.: 2.1.1.54
- CAS no.: 61970-01-2

Databases
- IntEnz: IntEnz view
- BRENDA: BRENDA entry
- ExPASy: NiceZyme view
- KEGG: KEGG entry
- MetaCyc: metabolic pathway
- PRIAM: profile
- PDB structures: RCSB PDB PDBe PDBsum
- Gene Ontology: AmiGO / QuickGO
Search
- PMC: articles
- PubMed: articles
- NCBI: proteins

In enzymology, a deoxycytidylate C-methyltransferase (EC 2.1.1.54) is an enzyme that catalyzes the chemical reaction

5,10-methylenetetrahydrofolate + dCMP $\rightleftharpoons$ dihydrofolate + deoxy-5-methylcytidylate

Thus, the two substrates of this enzyme are 5,10-Methylenetetrahydrofolic acid and dCMP, whereas its two products are dihydrofolic acid and deoxy-5-methylcytidylic acid.

This enzyme belongs to the family of transferases, specifically those transferring one-carbon group methyltransferases. The systematic name of this enzyme class is 5,10-methylenetetrahydrofolate:dCMP C-methyltransferase. Other names in common use include deoxycytidylate methyltransferase, and dCMP methyltransferase.
