= Deoxycytidine =

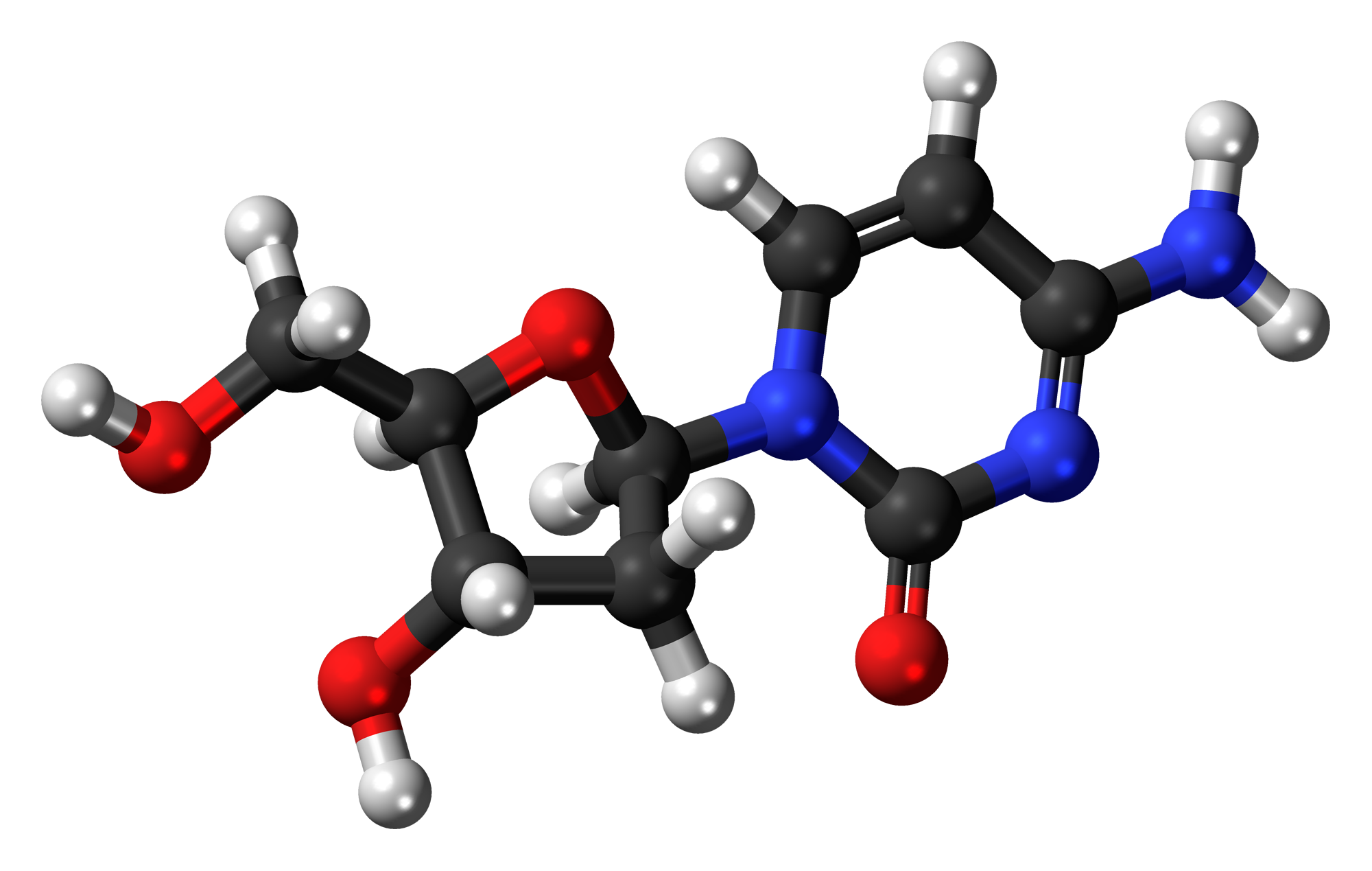

Names
- IUPAC name 2′-deoxycytidine
- Systematic IUPAC name 4-Amino-1-[(2R,4S,5R)-4-hydroxy-5-(hydroxymethyl)oxolan-2-yl]pyrimidin-2(1H)-one
- Other names doxecitine

Identifiers
CAS Number	951-77-9
3D model (JSmol)	Interactive image
ChEBI	CHEBI:15698
ChEMBL	ChEMBL66115
ChemSpider	13117
ECHA InfoCard	100.012.231
MeSH	Deoxycytidine
PubChem CID	13711
UNII	0W860991D6
CompTox Dashboard (EPA)	DTXSID70883620
- InChI: InChI=1S/C9H13N3O4/c10-7-1-2-12(9(15)11-7)8-3-5(14)6(4-13)16-8/h1-2,5-6,8,13-14H,3-4H2,(H2,10,11,15)/t5-,6+,8+/m0/s1 Key: CKTSBUTUHBMZGZ-SHYZEUOFSA-N; InChI=1/C9H13N3O4/c10-7-1-2-12(9(15)11-7)8-3-5(14)6(4-13)16-8/h1-2,5-6,8,13-14H,3-4H2,(H2,10,11,15)/t5-,6+,8+/m0/s1 Key: CKTSBUTUHBMZGZ-SHYZEUOFBO
- SMILES: c1cn(c(=O)nc1N)[C@H]2C[C@@H]([C@H](O2)CO)O

Properties
Chemical formula	C_{9}H_{13}N_{3}O_{4}
Molar mass	227.217
- Except where otherwise noted, data are given for materials in their standard state (at 25 °C [77 °F], 100 kPa). Infobox references

Deoxycytidine is a deoxyribonucleoside, a component of deoxyribonucleic acid. It is similar to the ribonucleoside cytidine, but with one hydroxyl group removed from the C2' position. Deoxycytidine can be phosphorylated at C5' of the deoxyribose by deoxycytidine kinase, converting it to deoxycytidine monophosphate (dCMP), a DNA precursor. dCMP can be converted to dUMP and dTMP.

Doxecitine is the international nonproprietary name.

== Clinical significance ==
Deoxycytidine can be used as a precursor for 5-aza-2′-deoxycytidine, a treatment for people with myelodysplastic syndrome. This compound slows the cell cycle by interfering with the methylation of the P15/INK4B gene, increasing the expression of P15/INK4B protein which subdues the transformation of MDS to leukemia.

Deoxycytidine can serve as a biomarker for tumor diagnosis. Deoxycytidine can be used as a biomarker for breast cancer patients and healthy individuals. 5-(Hydroxymethyl)-2′-deoxycytidine (5-hmdC), 5-(formyl)-2′-deoxycytidine (5-fodC), and 5-(carboxyl)-2′-deoxycytidine (5-cadC) are intermediates in the DNA demethylation pathway and can act as biomarkers. 5-hmdC levels were significantly reduced in urine samples of breast cancer patients, while 5-fodC and 5-cadC levels were elevated.

Doxecitine is a component of the medication doxecitine/doxribtimine used for the treatment of thymidine kinase 2 deficiency.
