= RUMT =

RUMT may refer to:

- Hendrika van Rumt (1897–1985), Dutch gymnast
- TRNA (uracil-5-)-methyltransferase, an enzyme
