= 5-Methyluridine =

One of the five major nucleosides in nucleic acids

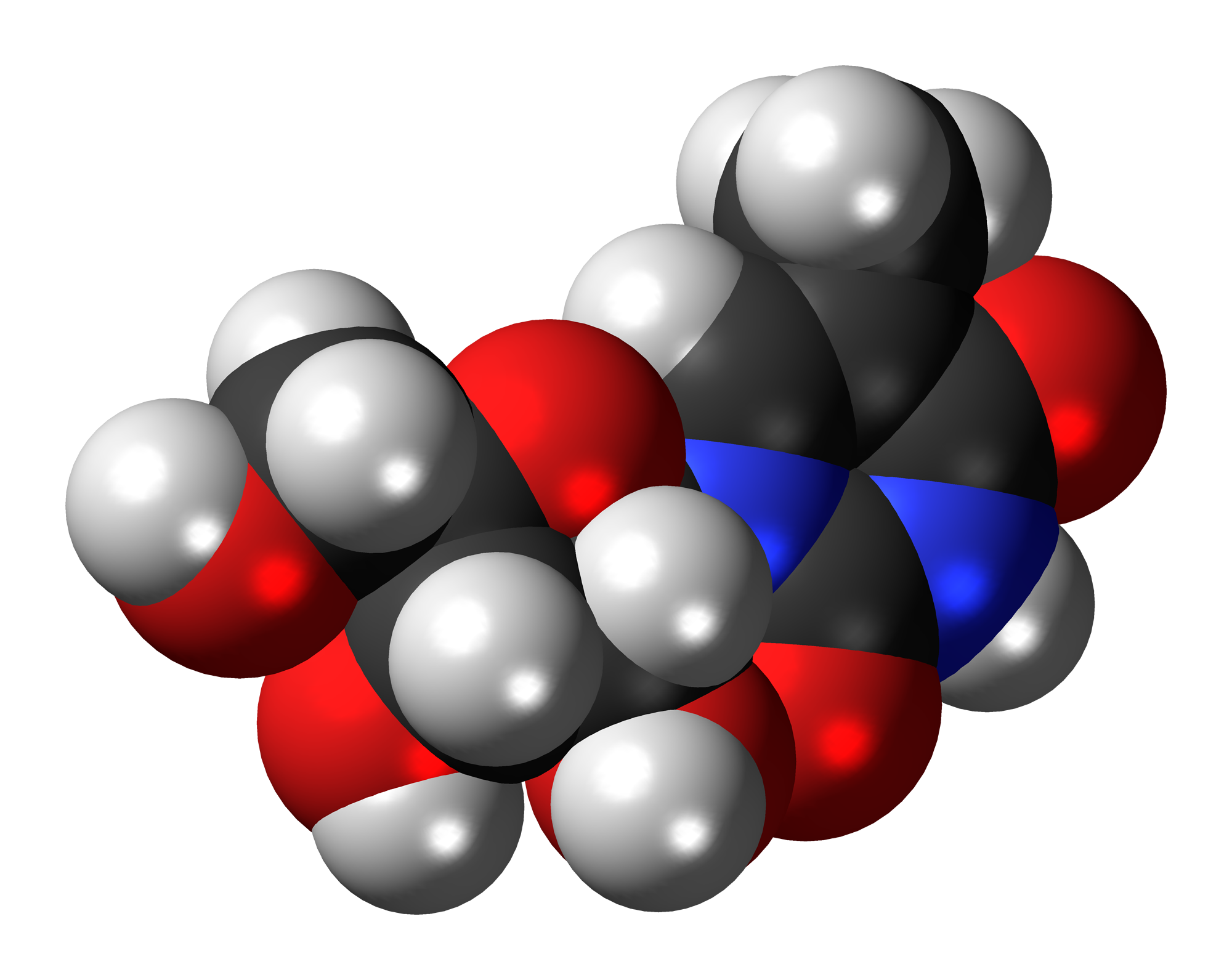

Names
- IUPAC name 5-Methyluridine
- Systematic IUPAC name 1-[(2R,3R,4S,5R)-3,4-Dihydroxy-5-(hydroxymethyl)oxolan-2-yl]-5-methylpyrimidine-2,4(1H,3H)-dione
- Other names Ribothymidine, Ribosylthymine; Thymine riboside, m5U

Identifiers
CAS Number	1463-10-1
3D model (JSmol)	Interactive image
ChemSpider	393058
ECHA InfoCard	100.014.522
PubChem CID	445408
UNII	ZS1409014A
CompTox Dashboard (EPA)	DTXSID20163348
- InChI: InChI=1S/C10H14N2O6/c1-4-2-12(10(17)11-8(4)16)9-7(15)6(14)5(3-13)18-9/h2,5-7,9,13-15H,3H2,1H3,(H,11,16,17)/t5-,6-,7-,9-/m1/s1 Key: DWRXFEITVBNRMK-JXOAFFINSA-N; InChI=1/C10H14N2O6/c1-4-2-12(10(17)11-8(4)16)9-7(15)6(14)5(3-13)18-9/h2,5-7,9,13-15H,3H2,1H3,(H,11,16,17)/t5-,6-,7-,9-/m1/s1 Key: DWRXFEITVBNRMK-JXOAFFINBW
- SMILES: CC1=CN(C(=O)NC1=O)[C@H]2[C@@H]([C@@H]([C@H](O2)CO)O)O

Properties
Chemical formula	C_{10}H_{14}N_{2}O_{6}
Molar mass	258.23 g/mol
Density	1,6 g/cm^{3}
Melting point	184 °C (363 °F; 457 K)
- Except where otherwise noted, data are given for materials in their standard state (at 25 °C [77 °F], 100 kPa). verify (what is ?) Infobox references

The chemical compound 5-methyluridine (symbol m^{5}U), also called ribothymidine (rT) (Note: The term ribothymidine is especially used to describe its unusual occurrence in RNA.), is a pyrimidine nucleoside. It is the ribonucleoside counterpart to the deoxyribonucleoside thymidine, which lacks a hydroxyl group at the 2' position. 5-Methyluridine contains a thymine base joined to a ribose pentose sugar. It is a white solid.

m^{5}U is one of the most common modifications made to cellular RNA. It almost universally occurs in position 54 (part of the T arm) of eukaryotic and bacterial tRNA, serving to stabilize the molecule. The same "T-loop" motif occurs in many other forms of noncoding RNA such as tmRNA and rRNA. Loss of the tRNA modification does not usually produce a different, less fit, phenotype.

== See also ==
- 5-Methylcytosine
- 3-Methyluridine
