= Cytidylate kinase =

Class of enzymes

Identifiers
- EC no.: 2.7.4.14
- CAS no.: 37278-21-0

Databases
- BRENDA: enzyme data
- ExPASy: NiceZyme view
- KEGG: enzyme entry
- MetaCyc: metabolic pathway
- Rhea: reactions
- PDB structures: RCSB PDB PDBe PDBsum
- Gene Ontology: AmiGO / QuickGO
Search
- PMC: articles
- PubMed: articles
- NCBI: proteins

Cytidylate kinase (EC 2.7.4.14) is an enzyme that catalyzes three related chemical reactions. In the first, cytidine monophosphate (CMP) is converted to cytidine diphosphate when a phosphate group is transferred from the cofactor, adenosine triphosphate (ATP), which is converted to adenosine diphosphate (ADP):

cytidine monophosphate
ATP
ADP
ATP
ADP
cytidine diphosphate

The enzyme can also convert the deoxynucleotide, deoxycytidine monophosphate (dCMP) to the corresponding dCDP and it also acts on uridine monophosphate:

uridine monophosphate
ATP
ADP
ATP
ADP
uridine diphosphate

The enzyme has been found in Tetrahymena pyriformis, Escherichia coli, Arabidopsis thaliana, Dictyostelium discoideum, and humans.

== Nomenclature ==
This enzyme is a transferase, specifically one transferring phosphorus-containing groups (phosphotransferases) with a phosphate group as acceptor. The systematic name of this enzyme class is ATP:CMP phosphotransferase. Other names in common use include: deoxycytidylate kinase, deoxycytidylate kinase, CMP kinase, CTP:CMP phosphotransferase, dCMP kinase, deoxycytidine monophosphokinase, UMP-CMP kinase, ATP:UMP-CMP phosphotransferase, and pyrimidine nucleoside monophosphate kinase.
