= (d)CMP kinase =

Class of enzymes

Identifiers
- EC no.: 2.7.4.25

Databases
- IntEnz: IntEnz view
- BRENDA: BRENDA entry
- ExPASy: NiceZyme view
- KEGG: KEGG entry
- MetaCyc: metabolic pathway
- PRIAM: profile
- PDB structures: RCSB PDB PDBe PDBsum
Search
- PMC: articles
- PubMed: articles
- NCBI: proteins

(d)CMP kinase (EC 2.7.4.25, prokaryotic cytidylate kinase, deoxycytidylate kinase, dCMP kinase, deoxycytidine monophosphokinase) is an enzyme with systematic name ATP:(d)CMP phosphotransferase. It catalyses two related chemical reactions. The first converts the nucleotide, cytidine monophosphate (CMP), to cytidine diphosphate by transferring a phosphate group from the cofactor, adenosine triphosphate (ATP), which is converted to adenosine diphosphate (ADP):

cytidine monophosphate
ATP
ADP
ATP
ADP
cytidine diphosphate

Alternatively, the enzyme can act on deoxycytidine monophosphate (dCMP):

deoxycytidine monophosphate
ATP
ADP
ATP
ADP
deoxycytidine diphosphate

This prokaryotic enzyme is specific for CMP or dCMP.
