= TRNA (uracil-5-)-methyltransferase =

tRNA (uracil-5-)-methyltransferase

Identifiers
- EC no.: 2.1.1.35
- CAS no.: 37257-02-6

Databases
- IntEnz: IntEnz view
- BRENDA: BRENDA entry
- ExPASy: NiceZyme view
- KEGG: KEGG entry
- MetaCyc: metabolic pathway
- PRIAM: profile
- PDB structures: RCSB PDB PDBe PDBsum
- Gene Ontology: AmiGO / QuickGO
Search
- PMC: articles
- PubMed: articles
- NCBI: proteins

In enzymology, a tRNA (uracil-5-)-methyltransferase (EC 2.1.1.35) is an enzyme that catalyzes the chemical reaction

S-adenosyl-L-methionine + tRNA containing uridine at position 54 $\rightleftharpoons$ S-adenosyl-L-homocysteine + tRNA containing ribothymidine at position 54

Thus, the two substrates of this enzyme are S-adenosyl methionine and tRNA containing uridine at position 54, whereas its two products are S-adenosylhomocysteine and tRNA containing ribothymidine at position 54.

This enzyme belongs to the family of transferases, specifically those transferring one-carbon group methyltransferases. The systematic name of this enzyme class is S-adenosyl-L-methionine:tRNA (uracil-5-)-methyltransferase. Other names in common use include ribothymidyl synthase, transfer RNA uracil 5-methyltransferase, transfer RNA uracil methylase, tRNA uracil 5-methyltransferase, m5U-methyltransferase, tRNA:m5U54-methyltransferase, and RUMT.
