= Deoxycytidine kinase =

Protein-coding gene in the species Homo sapiens

DCK
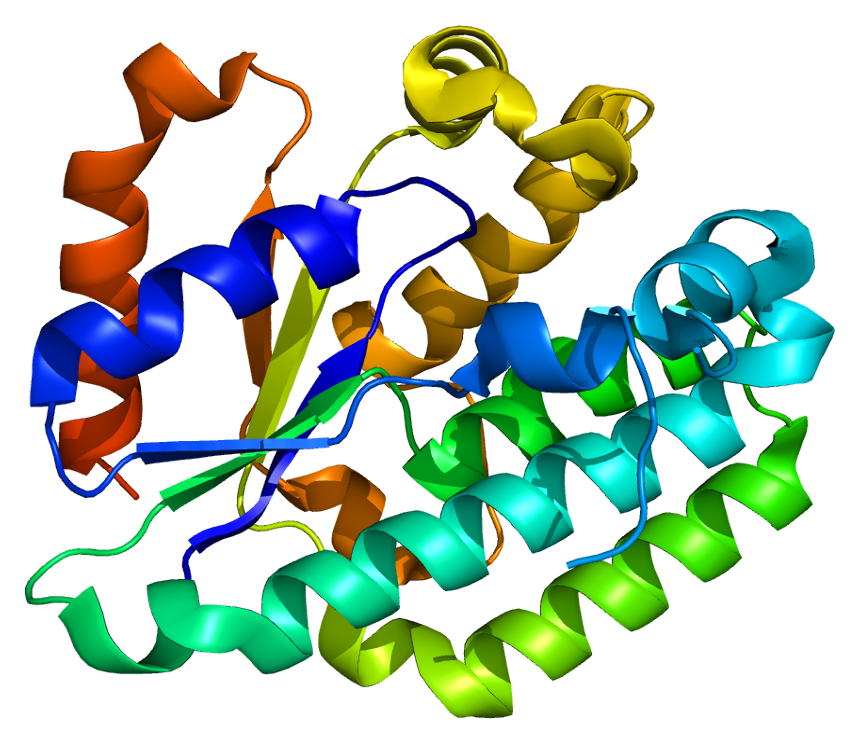

Identifiers
- Aliases: DCK, entrez:1633, deoxycytidine kinase
- External IDs: OMIM: 125450; MGI: 102726; GeneCards: DCK
Available structures
PDB	Ortholog search: PDBe RCSB
PDB	List of PDB id codes 1P5Z, 1P60, 1P61, 1P62, 2A2Z, 2A30, 2A7Q, 2NO0, 2NO1, 2NO6, 2NO7, 2NO9, 2NOA, 2QRN, 2QRO, 2ZI3, 2ZI4, 2ZI5, 2ZI6, 2ZI7, 2ZI9, 2ZIA, 3HP1, 3IPX, 3IPY, 3KFX, 3MJR, 3QEJ, 3QEN, 3QEO, 4JLJ, 4JLK, 4JLM, 4JLN, 4KCG, 4L5B, 4Q18, 4Q19, 4Q1A, 4Q1B, 4Q1C, 4Q1D, 4Q1E, 4Q1F
Enzyme activity
EC #	BRENDA	ExPASy	KEGG	MetaCyc
2.7.1.74	↗	↗	↗	↗
2.7.1.76	↗	↗	↗	↗
2.7.1.113	↗	↗	↗	↗

Gene location (Human)
Chr.	Chromosome 4 (human)
Band	4q13.3	Start	70,992,538 bp
Band	4q13.3	End	71,030,914 bp

Gene location (Mouse)
Chr.	Chromosome 5 (mouse)
Band	5|5 E1	Start	88,912,855 bp
Band	5|5 E1	End	88,931,140 bp
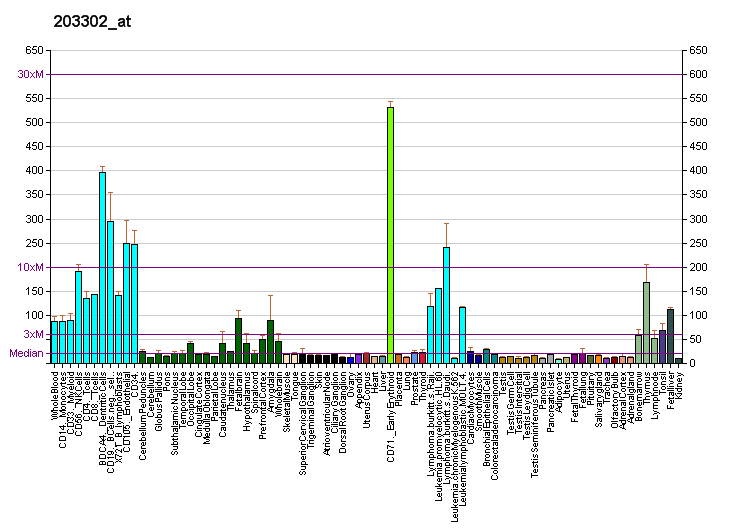
RNA expression pattern
Bgee	Human / Mouse (ortholog); Top expressed in: trabecular bone; buccal mucosa cell; monocyte; appendix; lymph node; secondary oocyte; ventricular zone; bone marrow; superficial temporal artery; ganglionic eminence / Top expressed in: human fetus; medial ganglionic eminence; gastrula; abdominal wall; barrel cortex; thymus; Rostral migratory stream; Gonadal ridge; primitive streak; precursor cell; More reference expression data
BioGPS	More reference expression data
Gene ontology
Molecular function	transferase activity; nucleotide binding; nucleoside kinase activity; deoxycytidine kinase activity; ATP binding; protein homodimerization activity; kinase activity; deoxynucleoside kinase activity
Cellular component	cytosol; nucleus; cytoplasm
Biological process	pyrimidine nucleoside salvage; pyrimidine nucleotide metabolic process; purine-containing compound salvage; nucleobase-containing compound metabolic process; phosphorylation; deoxyribonucleoside monophosphate biosynthetic process; nucleotide biosynthetic process
Sources:Amigo / QuickGO
Orthologs
Databases	NCBI: entry; OMA: entry
Species	Human	Mouse
Entrez	1633	13178
Ensembl	ENSG00000156136	ENSMUSG00000029366
UniProt	P27707	P43346
RefSeq (mRNA)	NM_000788	NM_007832
RefSeq (protein)	NP_000779	NP_031858
Location (UCSC)	Chr 4: 70.99 – 71.03 Mb	Chr 5: 88.91 – 88.93 Mb
PubMed search
- Wikidata
View/Edit Human	View/Edit Mouse

Deoxycytidine kinase (dCK) is an enzyme which is encoded by the DCK gene in humans. dCK predominantly phosphorylates deoxycytidine (dC) and converts dC into deoxycytidine monophosphate. dCK catalyzes one of the initial steps in the nucleoside salvage pathway and has the potential to phosphorylate other preformed nucleosides, specifically deoxyadenosine (dA) and deoxyguanosine (dG), and convert them into their monophosphate forms. There has been recent biomedical research interest in investigating dCK's potential as a therapeutic target for different types of cancer.

== Structure ==
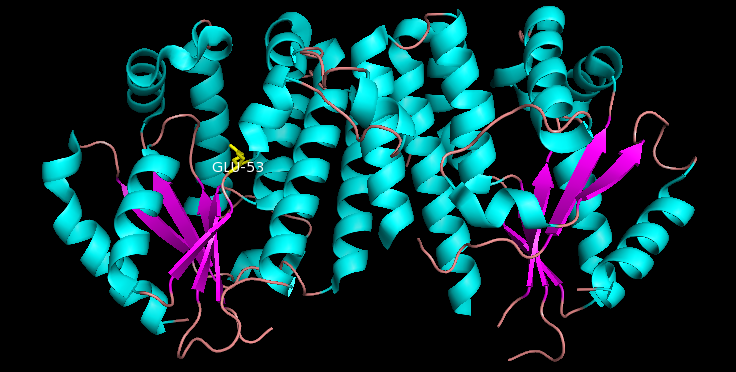
dCK homodimer with highlighted Glu53

dCK is a homodimer where each monomer subunit consists of multiple alpha helices surrounding a beta sheet core. Each subunit includes a nucleotide donor binding site, nucleoside acceptor binding site, nucleotide base sensing loop (240-254 residues), insert region (12-15 residues) that connects helices 2 and 3. dCK has several different protein conformations but its conformation depends on the nucleoside or nucleotide it binds to. dCK can bind to ADP, ATP, UDP or UTP (phosphoryl group donors) but UDP/UTP binding changes the enzyme's conformation by rearranging the nucleotide base sensing loop as compared to the dCK's conformation when bound to ATP. This change in conformation when a specific phosphoryl donor is bound in the nucleotide binding site determines which nucleoside can bind in the nucleoside binding site. For example, it has been observed that when dCK binds to ADP, dCK takes on a "closed" conformation or more compact nucleoside binding site where glutamic acid 53 (Glu53) is brought into closer proximity to directly interact with the nucleoside's 5' hydroxyl group.

- One hypothesis for the functionality of the "open" conformation is that the "open" conformation may assist in the initial nucleoside binding and the release of the monophosphate product

== Function ==
Deoxycytidine kinase (dCK) phosphorylates several deoxyribonucleosides and their nucleoside analogues (a nucleoside with a sugar and a different nucleic acid base substitute or analogue that has unique properties when modified) using phosphate groups from ATP and UTP. More specifically, dCK adds the first phosphoryl group to preformed nucleosides and is usually the rate-limiting enzyme of the overall process of converting nucleosides to their deoxynucleoside triphosphate form, or nucleotide form, in the nucleoside salvage pathway. Below is a simplified pathway that displays dCK's role in synthesizing nucleotides using the nucleoside salvage pathway.

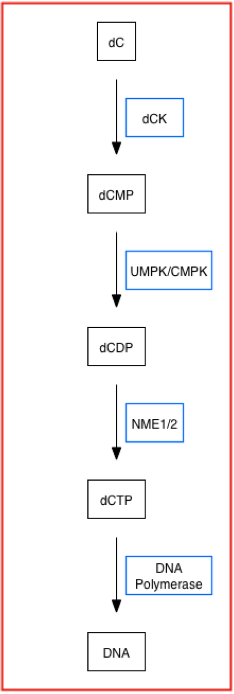
dCK's Role in the Nucleoside Salvage Pathway

Glu53 performs base catalysis to deprotonate the hydroxyl group, which allows the now nucleophilic oxygen from the nucleoside 5' hydroxyl group to attack the end of the phosphate chain (gamma phosphate) on the phosphoryl donor (e.g. ATP or UTP). This has deemed the "closed" conformation as the catalytically active conformation since it catalyzes the phosphoryl transfer between phosphoryl donors and receiving nucleosides. Similarly, "open" conformation is generally referred to as the catalytically inactive form since Glu53 is not in close proximity to nucleoside 5' hydroxyl group and will not catalyze the phosphoryl transfer.

== Regulation ==
One method of to regulate both catalytic activity and substrate specificity is a post-translational modification on Serine 74, a residue in the insert region on each of the individual dCK subunits. Although serine 74 is far from dCK's active site, phosphorylation of serine 74 (Ser74) on dCK causes a change in enzyme conformation and influences enzyme kinetics. More specifically, phosphorylation of Ser74 favors dCK to adopt its open (inactive) conformation and allow dCK to become more competent in binding and releasing nucleosides but restricts dCK from transferring phosphoryl groups. dCK's closed (active) conformation allows dCK to transfer phosphoryl groups, but not bind or release nucleosides. The "open" and "closed" states refer to the nucleoside binding site on dCK.

== Nucleotide biosynthesis ==
dCK is a key enzyme in the nucleoside salvage pathway (NSP). More specifically, this pathway recycles preformed nucleosides from degrading DNA molecules to synthesize dNTPs for the cell. The nucleoside salvage pathway can act as an alternative path to produce nucleotides (dNTP's) in case of de novo pathway downregulation. That is, the salvage pathway (and thus dCK) is upregulated when the de novo pathway is downregulated or inhibited in order to compensate for the loss in nucleotide production. Both the de novo pathway (DNP) and the nucleoside salvage pathway (NSP) are anabolic pathways that produce deoxyribonucleotide triphosphates (dNTP's) or nucleotides, the monomers that make up DNA.

== Therapeutic implications ==
Deficiency of dCK is associated with resistance to antiviral and anticancer chemotherapeutic agents. Conversely, increased deoxycytidine kinase activity is associated with increased activation of these agents to cytotoxic nucleoside triphosphate derivatives. dCK is clinically important because of its relationship to drug resistance and sensitivity. Manipulating dCK's enzymatic activity has been shown to have a strong correlation in sensitizing cells to the effects of other drugs (e.g. RNR inhibitors, gemcitabine) or treatments (e.g. ionizing radiation) and so more combination therapies are currently been studied to reduce biological resistance mechanisms and drug tolerance in patients.

For example, gemcitabine is a FDA-approved pyrimidine nucleoside analogue and a dCK activity based prodrug that has been used to treat pancreatic, breast, bladder and non-small cell lung cancer. Mechanistically, dCK, which uptakes preformed nucleosides, adds the first phosphoryl group on dFdC (gemcitabine's original form as a deoxycytidine analog) to convert it into dFdCMP, its monophosphate form. Cytidylate kinase or UMP-CMP kinase then adds the second phosphoryl group to form dFdCDP (gemcitabine diphosphate form), which can inhibit ribonucleotide reductase. Nucleoside-diphosphate kinase or nucleoside kinase A adds the third phosphoryl group to form dFdCTP (gemcitabine triphosphate form) which is gemcitabine's active form which inhibits both deoxycytidylate deaminase and DNA polymerase. Although gemcitabine has widely used to treat solid tumors for over a decade, patients taking gemcitabine alone (monotherapy) have been observed to develop chemoresistance to the drug.

== See also ==
- Nucleoside phosphorylase
