= Salvage enzyme =

Type of enzyme

Salvage enzymes are a kind of enzymes, called nucleoside kinases, required during cell division to "salvage" nucleotides, present in body fluids, for the manufacture of DNA.

They catalyze the phosphorylation of nucleosides to nucleoside - 5'-phosphates, that are further phosphorylated to triphosphates, that can be built into the growing DNA chain. The salvage enzymes are synthesized during the G1 phase in anticipation of DNA synthesis. After the cell division has been completed, the salvage enzymes, no longer required, are degraded. During interphase the cell derives its requirement of nucleoside-5'-phosphates by de novo synthesis, that leads directly to the 5'-monophosphate nucleotides.

Salvage enzymes are also essential in humans and their primate relatives in the production of urea and uric acid. This "salvage pathway" is needed to make uric acid; dysfunctions result in gout, urinary tract stones, and other serious disorders and health issues. Adenosine monophosphate (AMP) is a product of (created by) a salvage enzyme, and its metabolic dysfunction causes gout. Note that AMP is one of the four constituents of DNA and an important hormone in itself in many living organisms.

== See also ==
- CRISPR
- Gout
- Kidney stone
