= 1-O-Acetyl-2,3,5-tri-O-benzoyl-β-D-ribofuranose =

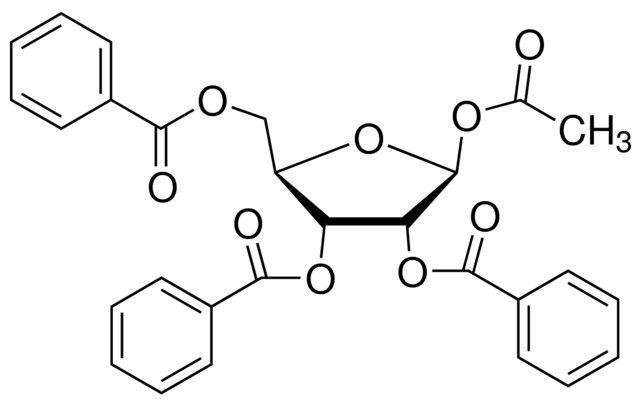

Names
- IUPAC name β-D-Ribofuranose 1-acetate 2,3,5-tribenzoate
- Systematic IUPAC name (2S,3R,4R,5R)-2-(Acetyloxy)-5-[(benzoyloxy)methyl]oxolane-3,4-diyl dibenzoate

Identifiers
CAS Number	6974-32-9
3D model (JSmol)	Interactive image
ChemSpider	73498
ECHA InfoCard	100.027.474
EC Number	230-220-4
PubChem CID	81455
UNII	UL5PL2ZUD2
CompTox Dashboard (EPA)	DTXSID40884346
- InChI: InChI=1S/C28H24O9/c1-18(29)34-28-24(37-27(32)21-15-9-4-10-16-21)23(36-26(31)20-13-7-3-8-14-20)22(35-28)17-33-25(30)19-11-5-2-6-12-19/h2-16,22-24,28H,17H2,1H3/t22-,23-,24-,28-/m1/s1 Key: GCZABPLTDYVJMP-CBUXHAPBSA-N
- SMILES: CC(=O)O[C@H]1[C@@H]([C@@H]([C@H](O1)COC(=O)C2=CC=CC=C2)OC(=O)C3=CC=CC=C3)OC(=O)C4=CC=CC=C4

Properties
Chemical formula	C_{28}H_{24}O_{9}
Molar mass	504.491 g·mol^{−1}
- Except where otherwise noted, data are given for materials in their standard state (at 25 °C [77 °F], 100 kPa). Infobox references

1-O-Acetyl-2,3,5-tri-O-benzoyl-β-D-ribofuranose, also called β-D-ribofuranose 1-acetate 2,3,5-tribenzoate, is a ribose-derived compound used in nucleoside synthesis.

== Industrial synthesis ==
In the patented formation of 1-O-acetyl-2,3,5-tri-O-benzoyl-β-L-ribofuranose, a reactor containing thionyl chloride (5 ml) and methyl alcohol (100 ml) is stirred at 0–5 °C for 10 to 15 minutes. After this period, 10 g (ratio-wise) of ribose is added to the flask. The flask is then stirred and maintained at its temperature for 8 hours. During this period, a methylation reaction will occur on the ribose. After the 8-hour period of methylation, the flask will be filled with 150 ml of ethyl acetate, 5 ml pyridine, and 30 g potassium carbonate. The flask will then be heated to 60–70 °C. Over 99 minutes at this temperature, 30 ml of the chemical benzyl chloride will be intermittently dripped into the flask to react with the ribose directly. After this period, the flask will be left for 4 to 8 hours to continue reacting. The subsequent solid nonacetylated ribose benzyl glycoside will be isolated by neutralizing the flask liquid by addition of sulfuric acid, then suction of the precipitate (the non-acetylated ribose benzyl glycoside). The benzyl ribose glucoside will then be put into a separate flask. In this flask, glacial acetic acid and acetic anhydride will be mixed with the benzyl glycoside under a maintained temperature from −5 to 5 °C for 5 hours. The 1-O-acetyl-2,3,5-tri-O-benzoyl-β-L-ribofuranose will be the product yielded after recrystallization with ethyl alcohol and isolation by known filtering methods.

== Use in artificial nucleotide synthesis ==
1-O-Acetyl-2,3,5-tri-O-benzoyl-β-D-ribofuranose is further reacted with trimethylsilyl trifluoromethanesulfonate (TMSOTf) under the silyl-Hilbert–Johnson reaction and deprotected by an acid or base to form a pure artificial nucleotide.
