= Thymidine kinase 2, mitochondrial =

Protein-coding gene in the species Homo sapiens

TK2

Identifiers
- Aliases: TK2, MTDPS2, MTTK, SCA31, thymidine kinase 2, mitochondrial, PEOB3, thymidine kinase 2, TK2-EXT
- External IDs: OMIM: 188250; MGI: 1913266; GeneCards: TK2
Enzyme activity
EC #	BRENDA	ExPASy	KEGG	MetaCyc
2.7.1.21	↗	↗	↗	↗
2.7.1.74	↗	↗	↗	↗

Gene location (Human)
Chr.	Chromosome 16 (human)
Band	16q21	Start	66,508,003 bp
Band	16q21	End	66,552,544 bp

Gene location (Mouse)
Chr.	Chromosome 8 (mouse)
Band	8|8 D3	Start	104,953,317 bp
Band	8|8 D3	End	104,975,190 bp
RNA expression pattern
Bgee	Human / Mouse (ortholog); Top expressed in: Achilles tendon; sural nerve; monocyte; epithelium of colon; left testis; right testis; adipose tissue; right adrenal gland; subcutaneous adipose tissue; stromal cell of endometrium / Top expressed in: granulocyte; superior surface of tongue; gallbladder; stroma of bone marrow; adrenal gland; transitional epithelium of urinary bladder; spleen; neural layer of retina; superior frontal gyrus; spermatocyte; More reference expression data
BioGPS	n/a
Gene ontology
Molecular function	transferase activity; nucleotide binding; deoxycytidine kinase activity; ATP binding; kinase activity; nucleoside kinase activity; thymidine kinase; deoxynucleoside kinase activity; thymidine kinase activity
Cellular component	mitochondrial matrix; mitochondrion; cytoplasm
Biological process	pyrimidine nucleoside salvage; thymidine metabolic process; deoxyribonucleoside monophosphate biosynthetic process; nucleotide biosynthetic process; DNA biosynthetic process; nucleobase-containing compound metabolic process; deoxycytidine metabolic process; phosphorylation
Sources:Amigo / QuickGO
Orthologs
Databases	NCBI: entry; OMA: entry
Species	Human	Mouse
Entrez	7084	57813
Ensembl	ENSG00000166548	ENSMUSG00000035824
UniProt	O00142	Q9R088
RefSeq (mRNA)	NM_001172643; NM_001172644; NM_001172645; NM_001271934; NM_001271935 NM_001272050; NM_004614	NM_021028
RefSeq (protein)	NP_001166114; NP_001166115; NP_001166116; NP_001258863; NP_001258864 NP_001258979; NP_004605	n/a
Location (UCSC)	Chr 16: 66.51 – 66.55 Mb	Chr 8: 104.95 – 104.98 Mb
PubMed search
- Wikidata
View/Edit Human	View/Edit Mouse

Thymidine kinase 2, mitochondrial is a protein that in humans is encoded by the TK2 gene.

== Function ==
This gene encodes a deoxyribonucleoside kinase that specifically phosphorylates thymidine, deoxycytidine, and deoxyuridine. The encoded enzyme localizes to the mitochondria and is required for mitochondrial DNA synthesis. Mutations in this gene are associated with a myopathic form of mitochondrial DNA depletion syndrome. Alternate splicing results in multiple transcript variants encoding distinct isoforms, some of which lack transit peptide, so are not localized to mitochondria.

This kinase is not present in yeast.
