= Elutriation =

Particle separation

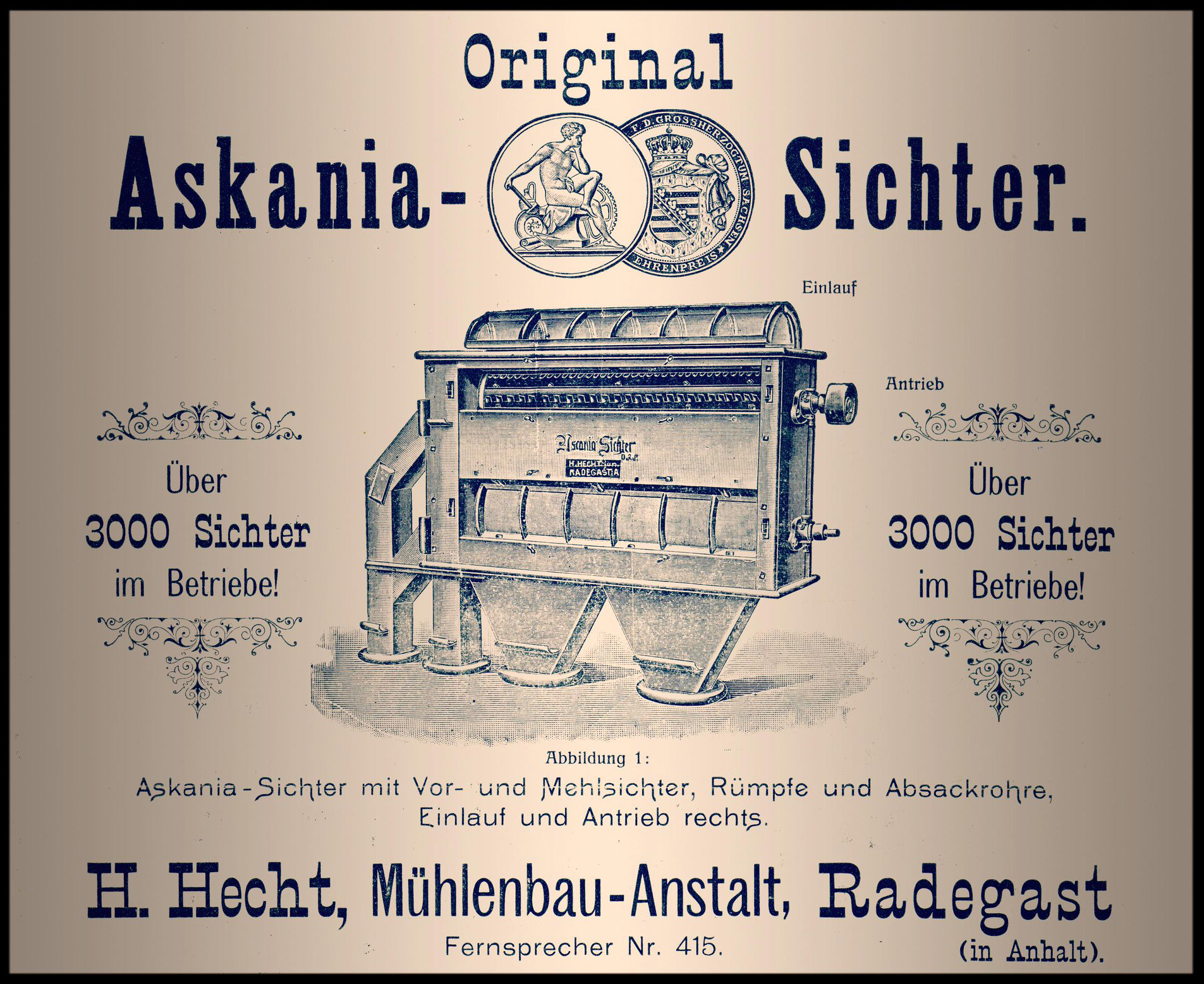

Elutriation is a process for separating particles based on their size, shape and density, using a stream of gas or liquid flowing in a direction usually opposite to the direction of sedimentation. This method is mainly used for particles smaller than 1 μm. The smaller or lighter particles rise to the top (overflow) because their terminal sedimentation velocities are lower than the velocity of the rising fluid. The terminal velocity of any particle in any medium can be calculated using Stokes' law if the particle's Reynolds number is below 0.2. Counterflow centrifugation elutriation is a related technique to separate cells.

== Air classification ==
An air elutriator is a simple device which can separate particles into two or more groups.

Material may be separated by means of an elutriator, which consists of a vertical tube up which fluid is passed at a controlled velocity. When the particles are introduced, often through a side tube, the smaller particles are carried over in the fluid stream while the larger particles settle against the upward current. If one starts with low flow rates, small less dense particles attain their terminal velocities, and flow with the stream. The particle from the stream is collected in overflow and hence will be separated from the feed. Flow rates can be increased to separate higher size ranges. Further size fractions may be collected if the overflow from the first tube is passed vertically upwards through a second tube of greater cross-section, and any number of such tubes can be arranged in series.

== Geology ==
Pyroclastic flows from volcanoes are associated with elutriation. Coarser material is confined to near the ground and the finer particles rise buoyantly toward the top.

=== Mineral Processing ===
It is used in mineral processing for size classification. The elutriation dust value is a usual measure for quantification of dust, generated by testing wherein mechanical forces such as vibration are applied to granules of e.g. a detergent agent.

== Biology ==
=== Laboratory separations of single cells ===
Centrifugal elutriation has been used for the separation of fission yeast by cell cycle status.

=== Biological Sediment Processing ===
Elutriation is a common method used by biologists to sample meiofauna. The sediment sample is constantly agitated by a flow of filtered water from below, the action of which dislodges interstitial organisms embedded between sediment grains. A very fine filter at the top captures these organisms from the overflow.

== See also ==
- Air classifier
- Counterflow centrifugation elutriation
