= 3-Methyluridine =

Names
- IUPAC name 3-Methyluridine
- Systematic IUPAC name 1-[(2R,3R,4S,5R)-3,4-Dihydroxy-5-(hydroxymethyl)oxolan-2-yl]-3-methylpyrimidine-2,4(1H,3H)-dione
- Other names N3-Methyluridine; N-3-Methyluridine

Identifiers
CAS Number	2140-69-4
3D model (JSmol)	Interactive image
ChEBI	CHEBI:89487
ChemSpider	29272117
PubChem CID	99592
CompTox Dashboard (EPA)	DTXSID201316911
- InChI: InChI=1S/C10H14N2O6/c1-11-6(14)2-3-12(10(11)17)9-8(16)7(15)5(4-13)18-9/h2-3,5,7-9,13,15-16H,4H2,1H3/t5-,7-,8-,9-/m1/s1 Key: UTQUILVPBZEHTK-ZOQUXTDFSA-N
- SMILES: CN1C(=O)C=CN(C1=O)[C@H]2[C@@H]([C@@H]([C@H](O2)CO)O)O

Properties
Chemical formula	C_{10}H_{14}N_{2}O_{6}
Molar mass	258.230 g·mol^{−1}
- Except where otherwise noted, data are given for materials in their standard state (at 25 °C [77 °F], 100 kPa). Infobox references

The chemical compound 3-methyluridine, also called N3-methyluridine, is a pyrimidine nucleoside (abbreviated m3U). In living organisms it is present as RNA modification which has been detected in 23S rRNA of archaea, 16S and 23S rRNA of eubacteria, and 18S, 25S, and 28S of eukaryotic ribosomal RNAs.

== See also ==
- 5-Methyluridine
