= Deoxycytidine diphosphate =

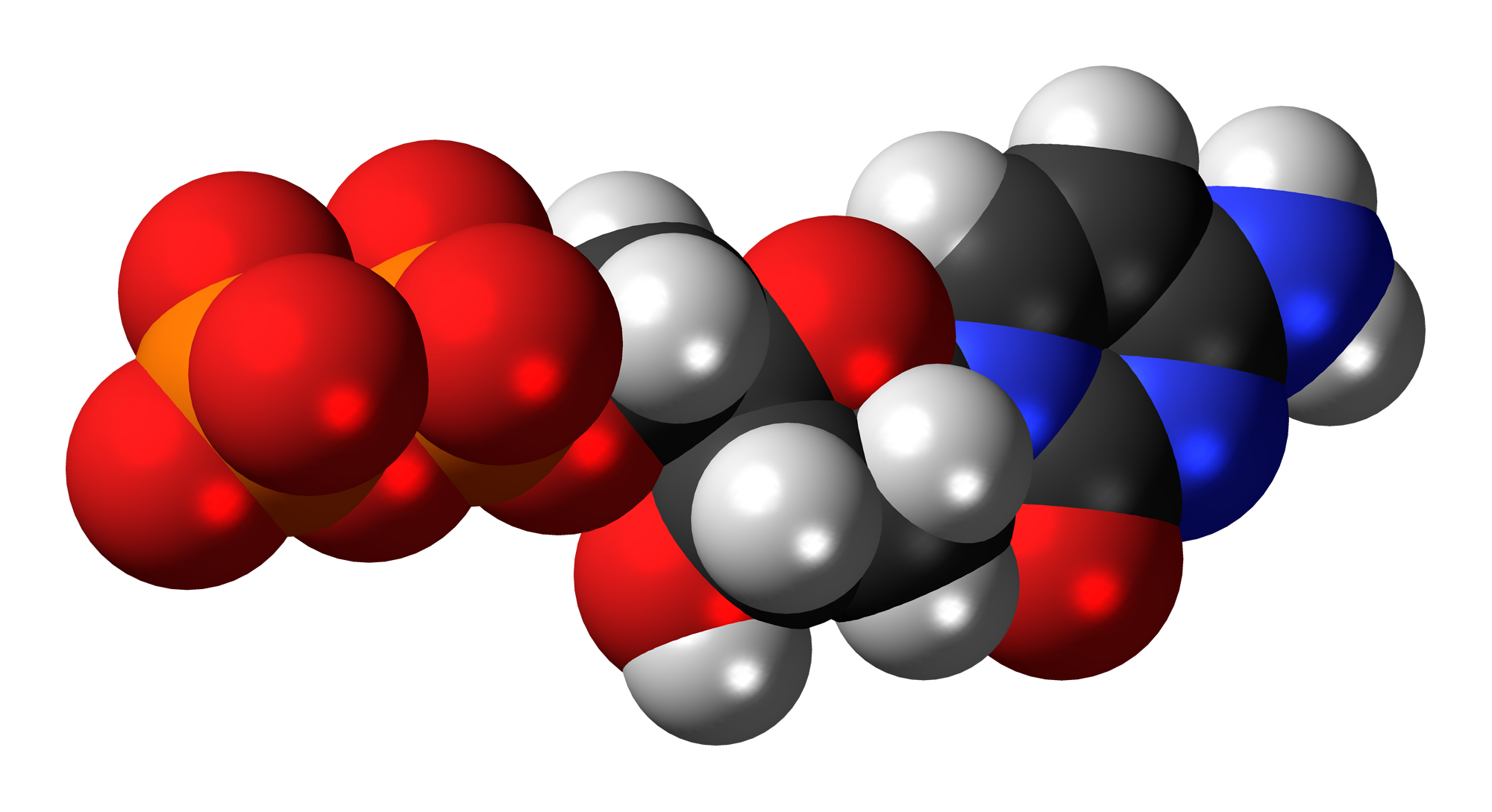

Names
- IUPAC name 2′-Deoxycytidine 5′-(trihydrogen diphosphate)
- Systematic IUPAC name [(2R,3S,5R)-5-(4-Amino-2-oxopyrimidin-1(2H)-yl)-3-hydroxyoxolan-2-yl]methyl trihydrogen diphosphate
- Other names 2'-Deoxycytidine diphosphate

Identifiers
CAS Number	800-73-7
3D model (JSmol)	Interactive image
ChemSpider	132961
MeSH	deoxycytidine+diphosphate
PubChem CID	150855
UNII	M07S1BKN37
CompTox Dashboard (EPA)	DTXSID301027111
- InChI: InChI=1S/C9H15N3O10P2/c10-7-1-2-12(9(14)11-7)8-3-5(13)6(21-8)4-20-24(18,19)22-23(15,16)17/h1-2,5-6,8,13H,3-4H2,(H,18,19)(H2,10,11,14)(H2,15,16,17)/t5-,6+,8+/m0/s1 Key: FTDHDKPUHBLBTL-SHYZEUOFSA-N; InChI=1/C9H15N3O10P2/c10-7-1-2-12(9(14)11-7)8-3-5(13)6(21-8)4-20-24(18,19)22-23(15,16)17/h1-2,5-6,8,13H,3-4H2,(H,18,19)(H2,10,11,14)(H2,15,16,17)/t5-,6+,8+/m0/s1 Key: FTDHDKPUHBLBTL-SHYZEUOFBT
- SMILES: O=P(O)(O)OP(=O)(O)OC[C@H]2O[C@@H](N/1C(=O)/N=C(/N)\C=C\1)C[C@@H]2O

Properties
Chemical formula	C_{9}H_{15}N_{3}O_{10}P_{2}
Molar mass	387.178 g·mol^{−1}
- Except where otherwise noted, data are given for materials in their standard state (at 25 °C [77 °F], 100 kPa). verify (what is ?) Infobox references

Deoxycytidine diphosphate is a nucleoside diphosphate. It is related to the common nucleic acid CTP, or cytidine triphosphate, with the -OH (hydroxyl) group on the 2' carbon on the nucleotide's pentose removed (hence the deoxy- part of the name), and with one fewer phosphoryl group than CTP .

2'-Deoxycytidine diphosphate is abbreviated as dCDP.

== Synthesis of cytidine nucleotides ==
Deoxycytidine diphosphate is synthesized through the oxidation-reduction reaction of cytidine 5'-diphosphocholine which is catalyzed by the presence of ribonucleoside-diphosphate reductase. Additionally, ribonucleoside-diphosphate reductase is capable of binding and catalyzing both the formation of deoxyribonucleotides from ribonucleotide.

== See also ==
- DNA
- Cofactor
- Cytosine
