= Counterflow centrifugal elutriation =

Counterflow centrifugal elutriation (CCE) is a liquid clarification technique. This method enables scientists to separate different cells with different sizes. Since cell size is correlated with cell cycle stages this method also allows the separation of cells at different stages of the cell cycle.

== Principle ==
The key concept is that larger cells tend to stay within the flowing buffer solution while smaller cells will be washed away follow the buffer solution (different sedimentation property within the buffer solution), and cells will have different sedimentation properties in different cell cycle stages.

The basic principle of separating the cells inside CCE is the balance between centripetal and the counter flow drag force. When the cells enter the elutriation chamber, all the cells will stay at the outer edge of the chamber due to centrifugal force. Then when the flow rate of the buffer solution increases, the solution tends to push the cells towards the middle of the CCE. When the counter flow drag force outweighs the centripetal force, particles will be driven by the net force and leave the chamber. Smaller particles are able to leave the chamber at lower flow rates. In contrast, larger particles will stay within the elutriation chamber. Therefore, buffer flow rate can be used to control size sorting within the elutriation chamber.

== Advantages ==
During the separation, the cell only needs to be suspended in a buffer solution and enter a centrifuge, the whole processes does not involve any chemical (e.g. staining) and physical (e.g. attachment of antibody, lyses of cell membrane) effect on the cells, so the cell will remain unchanged before and after the separation. Because of this, the collected cells can be used for further experiment or further separation by other techniques. Finally the CCE rely on centrifugal force and the counter flow drag force to separate the cells, so the speed of separation is fast. In summary:

- Minimum effect on the cells
- High recovery viability
- Separated cells can be used further
- Rapid

== Disadvantages ==
As mentioned above, the CCE separates cells based on their sedimentation property but not specific features (e.g. surface protein, cell shape). It cannot separate different types of cells which have similar sedimentation properties. This means that previous purification needs to be done for mixed cell type sample. The CCE is also limited to cells which are able to be individually suspended in the buffer solution. Cells which always attach to something cannot be separated by the CCE.
