= Nucleoside =

Any of several glycosylamines comprising a nucleobase and a sugar molecule

deoxyadenosine

adenosine

Two corresponding nucleosides, the deoxyribonucleoside, deoxyadenosine, and the ribonucleoside, adenosine. The line-angle molecular representation implies carbon atoms at each angle, each with enough hydrogen atoms to fill its four-bond valency.

Nucleosides are glycosylamines that can be thought of as nucleotides without a phosphate group. A nucleoside consists simply of a nucleobase (also termed a nitrogenous base) and a five-carbon sugar (ribose or 2'-deoxyribose) whereas a nucleotide is composed of a nucleobase, a five-carbon sugar, and one or more phosphate groups. In a nucleoside, the anomeric carbon is linked through a glycosidic bond to the N9 of a purine or the N1 of a pyrimidine. Nucleotides are the molecular building blocks of DNA and RNA.

== List of nucleosides and corresponding nucleobases ==
This list does not include modified nucleobases and the corresponding nucleosides

Each chemical has a short symbol, useful when the chemical family is clear from the context, and a longer symbol, if further disambiguation is needed. For example, long nucleobase sequences in genomes are usually described by CATG symbols, not Cyt-Ade-Thy-Gua (see Nucleic acid sequence § Notation).

Nitrogenous base	Ribonucleoside	Deoxyribonucleoside
adenine symbol A or Ade	adenosine symbol A or Ado	deoxyadenosine symbol dA or dAdo
guanine symbol G or Gua	guanosine symbol G or Guo	deoxyguanosine symbol dG or dGuo
thymine (5-methyluracil) symbol T or Thy	5-methyluridine (ribothymidine) symbol m⁵U	thymidine (deoxythymidine) symbol dT or dThd (dated: T or Thd)
uracil symbol U or Ura	uridine symbol U or Urd	deoxyuridine symbol dU or dUrd
cytosine symbol C or Cyt	cytidine symbol C or Cyd	deoxycytidine symbol dC or dCyd

== Sources ==
Nucleosides can be produced from nucleotides de novo, particularly in the liver, but they are more abundantly supplied via ingestion and digestion of nucleic acids in the diet, whereby nucleotidases break down nucleotides (such as the thymidine monophosphate) into nucleosides (such as thymidine) and phosphate. The nucleosides, in turn, are subsequently broken down in the lumen of the digestive system by nucleosidases into nucleobases and ribose or deoxyribose. In addition, nucleotides can be broken down inside the cell into nitrogenous bases, and ribose-1-phosphate or deoxyribose-1-phosphate.

== Use in medicine and technology ==
In medicine several nucleoside analogues are used as antiviral or anticancer agents. The viral polymerase incorporates these compounds with non-canonical bases. These compounds are activated in the cells by being converted into nucleotides. They are administered as nucleosides since charged nucleotides cannot easily cross cell membranes.

In molecular biology, several analogues of the sugar backbone exist. Due to the low stability of RNA, which is prone to hydrolysis, several more stable alternative nucleoside/nucleotide analogues that correctly bind to RNA are used. This is achieved by using a different backbone sugar. These analogues include locked nucleic acids (LNA), morpholinos and peptide nucleic acids (PNA).

In sequencing, dideoxynucleotides are used. These nucleotides possess the non-canonical sugar dideoxyribose, which lacks 3' hydroxyl group (which accepts the phosphate). DNA polymerases cannot distinguish between these and regular deoxyribonucleotides, but when incorporated a dideoxynucleotide cannot bond with the next base and the chain is terminated.

== Prebiotic synthesis of ribonucleosides ==
In order to understand how life arose, knowledge is required of the chemical pathways that permit formation of the key building blocks of life under plausible prebiotic conditions. According to the RNA world hypothesis free-floating ribonucleosides and ribonucleotides were present in the primitive soup. Molecules as complex as RNA must have arisen from small molecules whose reactivity was governed by physico-chemical processes. RNA is composed of purine and pyrimidine nucleotides, both of which are necessary for reliable information transfer, and thus Darwinian natural selection and evolution. Nam et al. demonstrated the direct condensation of nucleobases with ribose to give ribonucleosides in aqueous microdroplets, a key step leading to RNA formation. Also, a plausible prebiotic process for synthesizing pyrimidine and purine ribonucleosides and ribonucleotides using wet-dry cycles was presented by Becker et al.

== See also ==
- Arabinosyl nucleosides
- Nucleobase
- Salvage enzyme
- Synthesis of nucleosides
