= Substrate analog =

Substrate analogs (substrate state analogues), are chemical compounds with a chemical structure that resemble the substrate molecule in an enzyme-catalyzed chemical reaction. Substrate analogs can act as competitive inhibitors of an enzymatic reaction. An example is phosphoramidate to the Tetrahymena group I ribozyme. Other examples of substrate analogs include 5’-adenylyl-imidodiphosphate, a substrate analog of ATP, and 3-acetylpyridine adenine dinucleotide, a substrate analog of NADH.

As a competitive inhibitor, substrate analogs occupy the same binding site as its analog, and decrease the intended substrate’s efficiency. The maximum rate (V_{max}) remains the same while the intended substrate’s affinity (measured by the Michaelis constant K_{M}) is decreased. This means that less of the intended substrate will bind to the enzyme, resulting in less product being formed. In addition, the substrate analog may also be missing chemical components that allow the enzyme to go through with its reaction. This also causes the amount of product created to decrease.

Substrate analogs usually bind to the binding site reversibly. This means that the binding of the substrate analog to the enzyme’s binding site is non-permanent. The effect of the substrate analog can be nullified by increasing the concentration of the originally intended substrate. There are also substrate analogs that bind to the binding site of an enzyme irreversibly. If this is the case, the substrate analog is called an inhibitory substrate analog, a suicide substrate, or a Trojan horse substrate. An example of a substrate analog that is also a suicide substrate/Trojan horse substrate is penicillin, which is an inhibitory substrate analog of peptidoglycan.

Some substrate analogs can still allow the enzyme to synthesize a product despite the enzyme’s inability to metabolize the substrate analog. These substrate analogs are known as gratuitous inducers. An example of a substrate analog that is also a gratuitous inducer is IPTG (isopropyl β-D-1-thiogalactopyranoside), a substrate analog and gratuitous inducer of β-galactosidase activity.

== See also ==
- Enzyme
- Enzyme inhibitor
- Suicide inhibitor
- Structural analog, compounds with similar chemical structure
