= Ribonucleoside =

A ribonucleoside is a type of nucleoside including ribose as a component. They are analogous to the nucleosides that, along with a phosphate group, form nucleotides that are the functional units of DNA; however, ribonucleosides are principal components of RNA. These form ribonucleotides with the addition of a phosphate group, which chain to form a molecule of RNA.

Deoxyribonucleosides (or simply nucleosides) are synthesised from ribonucleosides through a series of reactions. It is possible for ribonucleosides to be converted to their deoxy form through a reaction catalysed by ribonucleoside disphosphate reductase. The enzyme itself provides reducing equivalents by having its sulfhydryl groups oxidised through the course of the reaction.

One example of a ribonucleoside is cytidine.
