= Thymidine =

Chemical compound

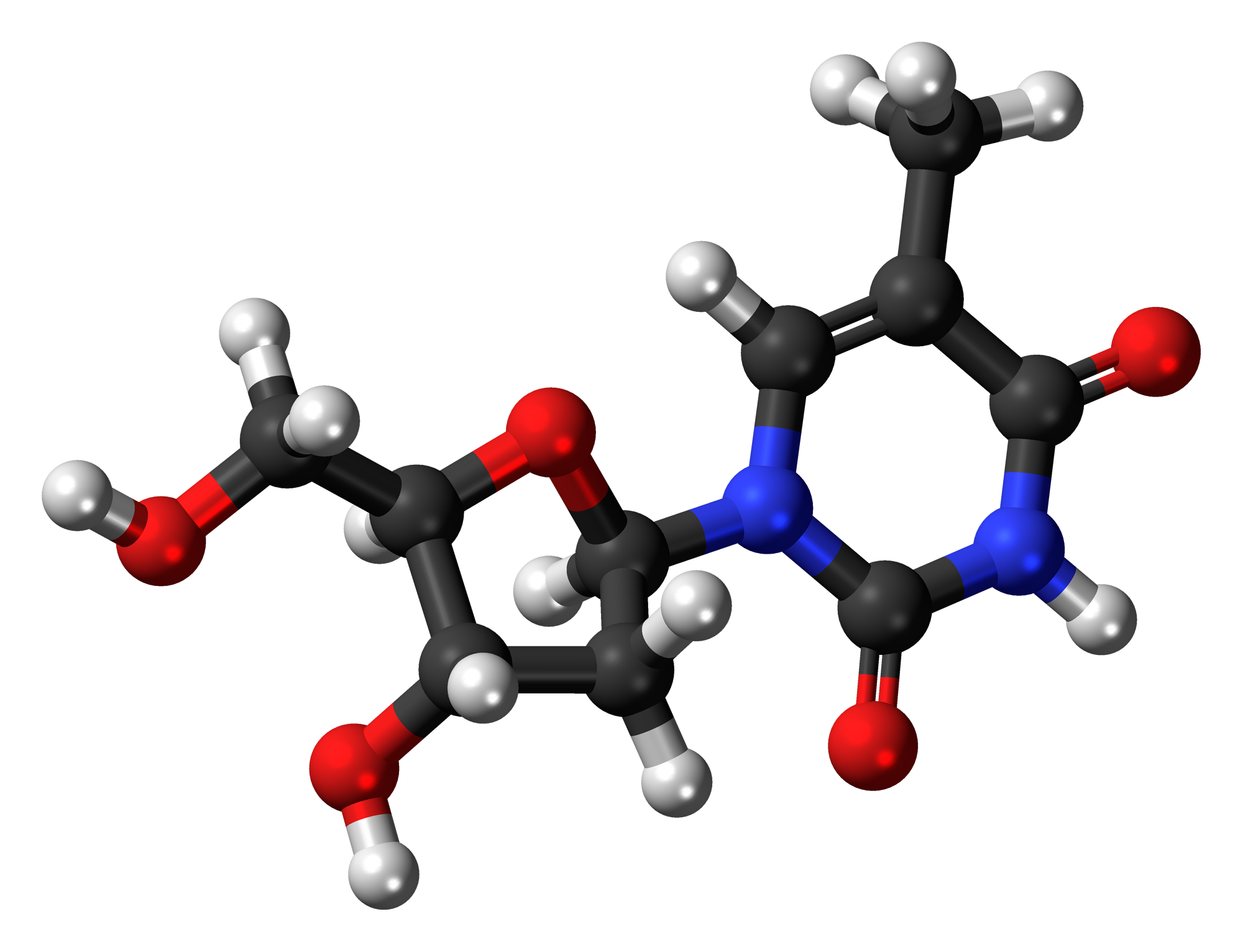

Names
- IUPAC name Thymidine
- Systematic IUPAC name 1-[(2R,4S,5R)-4-Hydroxy-5-(hydroxymethyl)oxolan-2-yl]-5-methylpyrimidine-2,4(1H,3H)-dione
- Other names deoxythymidine; doxribtimine; Td; dT; 1-[(2R,4S,5R)-4-Hydroxy-5-(hydroxymethyl)tetrahydrofur-2-yl]-5-methyl-1,3-dihydropyrimidine-2,4-dione

Identifiers
CAS Number	50-89-5
3D model (JSmol)	Interactive image
ChEMBL	ChEMBL52609
ChemSpider	5585
DrugBank	DB04485
ECHA InfoCard	100.000.065
IUPHAR/BPS	4718
MeSH	Deoxythymidine
PubChem CID	1134
UNII	VC2W18DGKR
CompTox Dashboard (EPA)	DTXSID5023661
- InChI: InChI=1S/C10H14N2O5/c1-5-3-12(10(16)11-9(5)15)8-2-6(14)7(4-13)17-8/h3,6-8,13-14H,2,4H2,1H3,(H,11,15,16)/t6-,7+,8+/m0/s1 Key: IQFYYKKMVGJFEH-XLPZGREQSA-N; InChI=1/C10H14N2O5/c1-5-3-12(10(16)11-9(5)15)8-2-6(14)7(4-13)17-8/h3,6-8,13-14H,2,4H2,1H3,(H,11,15,16)/t6-,7+,8+/m0/s1 Key: IQFYYKKMVGJFEH-XLPZGREQBQ
- SMILES: Cc1cn(c(=O)[nH]c1=O)[C@H]2C[C@@H]([C@H](O2)CO)O

Properties
Chemical formula	C_{10}H_{14}N_{2}O_{5}
Molar mass	242.231 g·mol^{−1}
Melting point	185 °C
- Except where otherwise noted, data are given for materials in their standard state (at 25 °C [77 °F], 100 kPa). Infobox references

Thymidine (symbol dT or dThd), also known as deoxythymidine, is a pyrimidine deoxynucleoside. Deoxythymidine is the DNA nucleoside T, which pairs with deoxyadenosine (A) in double-stranded DNA. In cell biology it is used to synchronize the cells in G1/early S phase. The prefix deoxy- is often left out since there are no precursors of thymine nucleotides involved in RNA synthesis.

Before the boom in thymidine use caused by the need for thymidine in the production of the antiretroviral drug azidothymidine (AZT), much of the world's thymidine production came from herring sperm. Thymidine occurs almost exclusively in DNA but it also occurs in the T-loop of tRNA.

== Chemistry ==
In its composition, deoxythymidine is a nucleoside composed of deoxyribose (a pentose sugar) joined to the pyrimidine base thymine.

Deoxythymidine can be phosphorylated with one, two or three phosphoric acid groups, creating dTMP (deoxythymidine monophosphate), dTDP, or dTTP (for the di- and tri- phosphates, respectively).

It exists in solid form as small white crystals or white crystalline powder. It has a molecular weight of 242.229 Da and a melting point of 185 °C. The stability of deoxythymidine under standard temperature and pressure (STP) is very high.

== Function ==
Deoxythymidine is non-toxic and is part of one of the four nucleosides in DNA. It is a naturally occurring compound that exists in all living organisms and DNA viruses. Instead of thymidine, RNA contains uridine (uracil joined to ribose). Uracil is chemically very similar to thymine, which is also known as 5-methyluracil. Since thymine nucleotides are precursors of DNA (but not RNA), the prefix "deoxy" is often left out; i.e., deoxythymidine is often just called thymidine.

== Clinical significance ==
Thymidine is listed as a chemical teratogen.

=== Medical use ===
As a pharmaceutical drug, deoxythymidine is known by the international nonproprietary name doxribtimine. Doxribtimine is a component of the medication doxecitine/doxribtimine used for the treatment of thymidine kinase 2 deficiency.

=== Derivatives with diagnostic or therapeutic applications ===
Radiolabeled thymidine (TdR), such as tritiated thymidine (^{3}H-TdR), is commonly used in cell proliferation assays. The thymidine is incorporated into dividing cells and the level of this incorporation, measured using a liquid scintillation counter, is proportional to the amount of cell proliferation. For example, lymphocyte proliferation can be measured this way in lymphoproliferative disorders.

Iododeoxyuridine is a radiosensitizer and increases the amount of DNA damage received from ionizing radiation.

Azidothymidine (AZT) – used in the treatment of HIV infection. AZT inhibits the process of reverse transcription, a critical step in the viral life cycle.

Bromodeoxyuridine (BrdU) is another thymidine analog that is often used for the detection of proliferating cells in living tissues.

5-Ethynyl-2´-deoxyuridine (EdU) is a thymidine analog which is incorporated into the DNA of dividing cells and is used to assay DNA synthesis in cell culture or living tissues. It can be visualized by covalently binding a fluorescent azide using click chemistry, which is less harsh than the conditions used to expose the epitope for BrdU antibodies.

Edoxudine is an antiviral drug.

Telbivudine (β-L-2′-deoxythymidine, LdT) is the unmodified "unnatural" L-enantiomer of thymidine that was used in the treatment of chronic hepatitis B.

=== Thymidine imbalance ===
During growth of bacteriophage T4, an excess of thymidine availability increases mutation. A deficiency of thymidine during growth also increases mutation. A thymidylate auxotroph of the diploid yeast Saccharomyces cerevisiae was grown under conditions in which thymidyate levels varied from excess to depletion.
