= Deoxycytidine monophosphate =

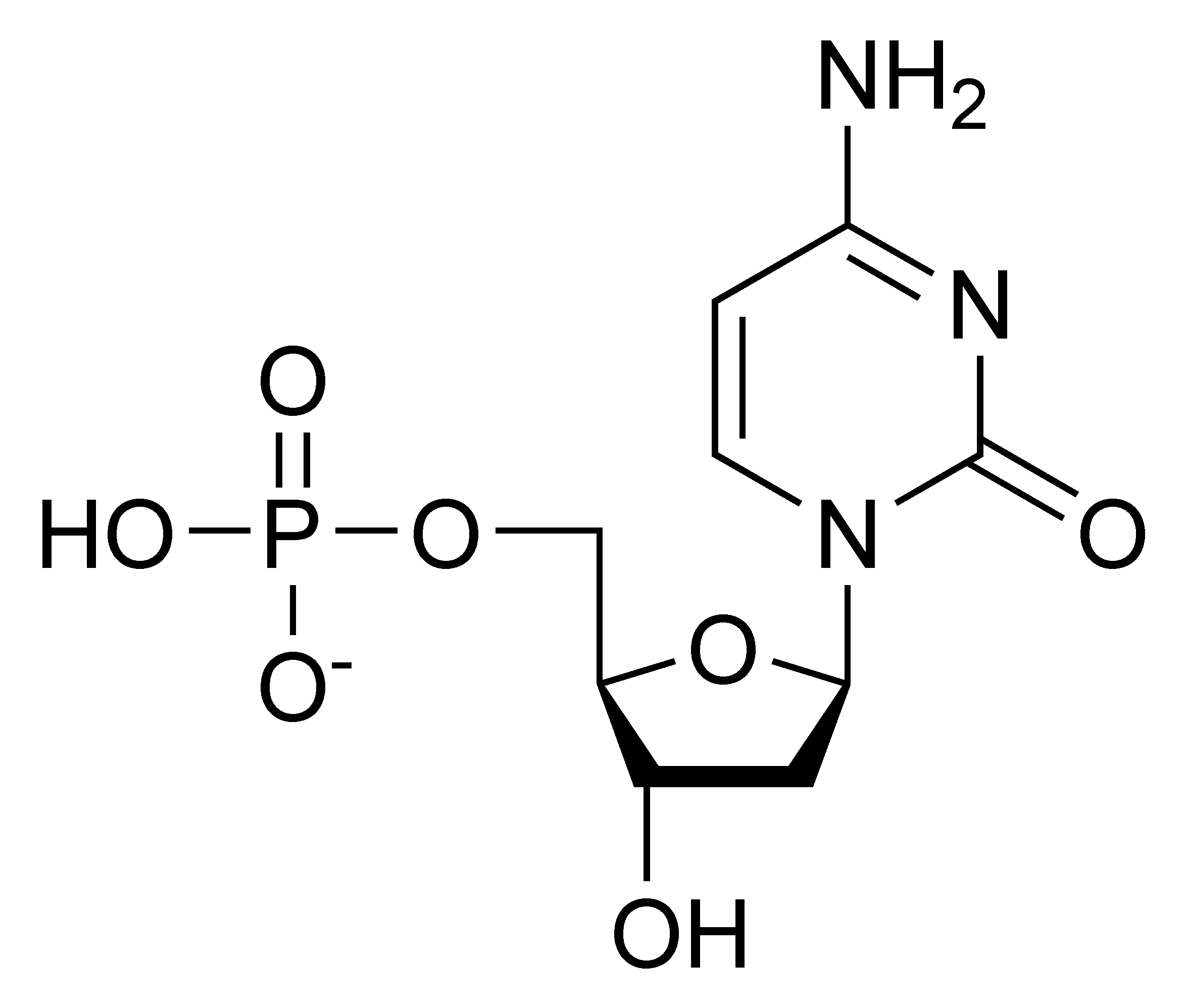

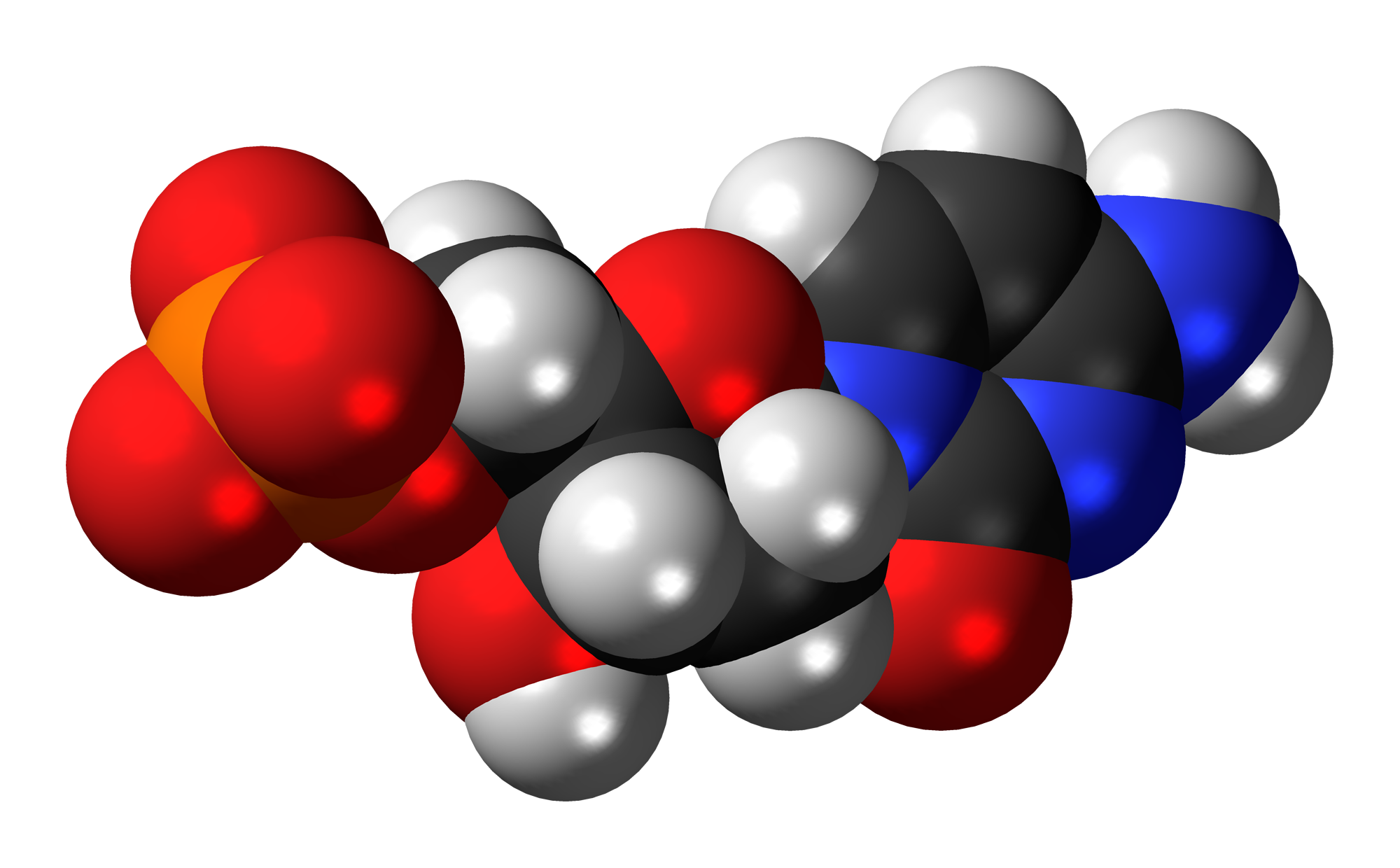

Names
- IUPAC name 2′-Deoxycytidylic acid
- Systematic IUPAC name [(2R,3S,5R)-5-(4-Amino-2-oxopyrimidin-1(2H)-yl)-3-hydroxyoxolan-2-yl]methyl dihydrogen phosphate

Identifiers
CAS Number	1032-65-1
3D model (JSmol)	Interactive image
ChEBI	CHEBI:15918
ChEMBL	ChEMBL374699
ChemSpider	13343
ECHA InfoCard	100.012.591
MeSH	Deoxycytidine+monophosphate
PubChem CID	624
UNII	W7A9174XQL
CompTox Dashboard (EPA)	DTXSID20908251 DTXSID40948477, DTXSID20908251
- InChI: InChI=1S/C9H14N3O7P/c10-7-1-2-12(9(14)11-7)8-3-5(13)6(19-8)4-18-20(15,16)17/h1-2,5-6,8,13H,3-4H2,(H2,10,11,14)(H2,15,16,17)/t5-,6+,8+/m0/s1 Key: NCMVOABPESMRCP-SHYZEUOFSA-N; InChI=1/C9H14N3O7P/c10-7-1-2-12(9(14)11-7)8-3-5(13)6(19-8)4-18-20(15,16)17/h1-2,5-6,8,13H,3-4H2,(H2,10,11,14)(H2,15,16,17)/t5-,6+,8+/m0/s1 Key: NCMVOABPESMRCP-SHYZEUOFBL
- SMILES: c1cn(c(=O)nc1N)[C@H]2C[C@@H]([C@H](O2)COP(=O)(O)O)O

Properties
Chemical formula	C_{9}H_{14}N_{3}O_{7}P
Molar mass	307.199 g·mol^{−1}
- Except where otherwise noted, data are given for materials in their standard state (at 25 °C [77 °F], 100 kPa). verify (what is ?) Infobox references

Deoxycytidine monophosphate (dCMP), also known as deoxycytidylic acid or deoxycytidylate in its conjugate acid and conjugate base forms, respectively, is a deoxynucleotide and one of the four monomers that make up DNA. In a DNA double helix, it will base pair with deoxyguanosine monophosphate.

== Medical use ==
Deoxycytidine monophosphate is a molecule of interest in treating genetic disorders such as thymidine kinase 2 (TK2) deficiency. In the case of TK2 deficiency, dCMP in conjunction with deoxythymidine monophosphate (dTMP) to bypass the deficiency in the TK2 enzyme. Additionally dCMP is an indicator of several metabolite deficiency pathways such as UMP synthase deficiency or orotic aciduria.

== See also ==
- Cytidine monophosphate
