= Deoxyribonucleotide =

Component of DNA

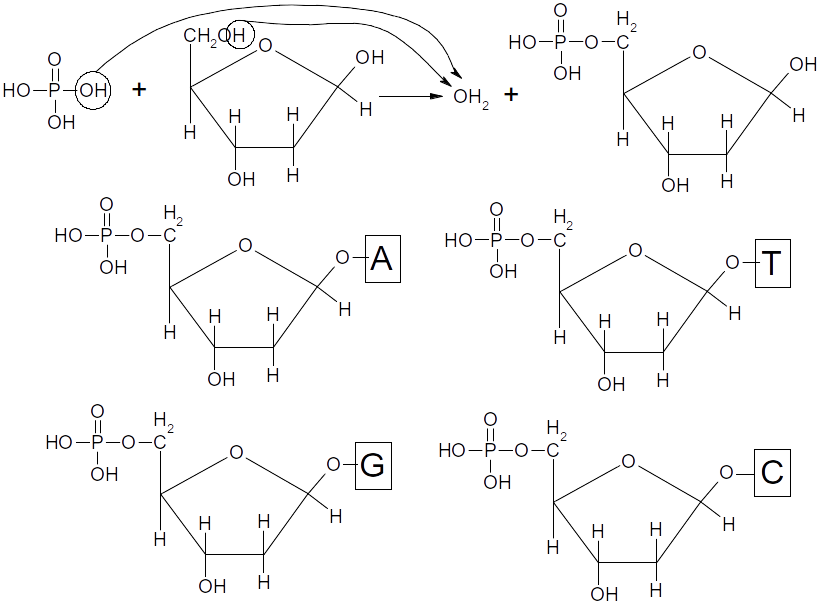
Diagrams of four types of deoxyribonucleotides

A deoxyribonucleotide is a nucleotide that contains deoxyribose. They are the monomeric units of the informational biopolymer, deoxyribonucleic acid (DNA). Each deoxyribonucleotide comprises three parts: a deoxyribose sugar (monosaccharide), a nitrogenous base, and one phosphoryl group. The nitrogenous bases are either purines or pyrimidines, heterocycles whose structures support the specific base-pairing interactions that allow nucleic acids to carry information. The base is always bonded to the 1'-carbon of the deoxyribose, an analog of ribose in which the hydroxyl group of the 2'-carbon is replaced with a hydrogen atom. The third component, the phosphoryl group, attaches to the deoxyribose monomer via the hydroxyl group on the 5'-carbon of the sugar.

When deoxyribonucleotides polymerize to form DNA, the phosphate group from one nucleotide will bond to the 3' carbon on another nucleotide, forming a phosphodiester bond via dehydration synthesis. New nucleotides are always added to the 3' carbon of the last nucleotide, so synthesis always proceeds from 5' to 3'.

== Deoxyribonucleoside ==
Just as a nucleoside can be considered as a nucleotide without a phosphate group, so too a deoxyribonucleoside is a nucleotide without a phosphate. An example is deoxycytidine.
