= Peter Francis =

Peter or Pete Francis may refer to:

- Pierre Francois, mid-17th century French pirate, often Anglicized as Peter Francis
- Peter Francis (runner) (born 1936), Kenyan Olympic athlete
- Peter Francis (volcanologist) (1944–1999), British volcanologist
- Peter Francis (footballer) (born 1958), former Australian rules footballer
- Peter Francis (priest) (born 1953), former provost of St Mary's Cathedral, Glasgow
- Pete Francis (born 1981), former guitarist and vocalist for the American jam band Dispatch
- Peter D. Francis (born 1934), American politician in the state of Washington
- Sir Nicholas Francis (judge) (Peter Nicholas Francis, born 1958), British barrister and judge
- Peter Francis (rugby union) (born 1957), Welsh rugby union player
- Peter Francis (art director) (born 1965), English-American art director and production designer
