= Deoxynucleoside kinase =

Class of enzyme

Identifiers
- EC no.: 2.7.1.145
- CAS no.: 52227-81-3

Databases
- IntEnz: IntEnz view
- BRENDA: BRENDA entry
- ExPASy: NiceZyme view
- KEGG: KEGG entry
- MetaCyc: metabolic pathway
- PRIAM: profile
- PDB structures: RCSB PDB PDBe PDBsum
- Gene Ontology: AmiGO / QuickGO
Search
- PMC: articles
- PubMed: articles
- NCBI: proteins

Deoxynucleoside kinases are generally grouped into two families based on structural homology:

TK1 family. This family has got its name from the human enzyme thymidine kinase 1. The substrate specificity is restricted to thymidine (and to lesser extent deoxyuridine) among the natural substrates. TK1 family members are widespread and found in eukaryotes as well as prokaryotes.

Non-TK1-like family. This family includes deoxycytidine kinase (cytosolic) as well as the two mitochondrial enzymes deoxyguanosine kinase and thymidine kinase 2 in humans. The base specificity is generally broader than for the TK-1 family. Non-TK1 family members are widespread and found in eukaryotes as well as prokaryotes. Also the herpesvirus thymidine kinase belongs to this family although it is not obvious from the sequence homology (it is still structurally related).

== Function ==
Deoxynucleoside kinase (EC 2.7.1.145) is an enzyme that catalyzes the general chemical reaction

ATP + 2'-deoxynucleoside $\rightleftharpoons$ ADP + 2'-deoxynucleoside 5'-phosphate

For example, one substrate of the enzyme is thymidine, which is converted to its monophosphate by transfer of a phosphate group from the cofactor, adenosine triphosphate (ATP):

ATP +
thymidine
ADP +
thymidine monophosphate

The enzyme characterised from Drosophila melanogaster is distinct from deoxyadenosine kinase and deoxyguanosine kinase in that it can act on all the common 2'-deoxyribonucleosides.

This enzyme is a transferase, specifically one transferring phosphorus-containing groups (phosphotransferases) with an alcohol group as acceptor. The systematic name of this enzyme class is ATP:deoxynucleoside 5'-phosphotransferase. Other names in common use include multispecific deoxynucleoside kinase, ms-dNK, multisubstrate deoxyribonucleoside kinase, multifunctional deoxynucleoside kinase, D. melanogaster deoxynucleoside kinase, and Dm-dNK.

== Structural studies ==
As of late 2007, 5 structures have been solved for this class of enzymes, with PDB accession codes PDB: 1OE0, PDB: 1OT3, PDB: 1ZM7, PDB: 1ZMX, and PDB: 2JCS.
