= SUCLG2 =

Protein-coding gene in the species Homo sapiens

Identifiers
- Aliases: SUCLG2, GBETA, succinate-CoA ligase GDP-forming beta subunit, G-SCS, GTPSCS, succinate-CoA ligase GDP-forming subunit beta
- External IDs: OMIM: 603922; MGI: 1306824; HomoloGene: 2854; GeneCards: SUCLG2; OMA:SUCLG2 - orthologs

Gene location (Human)
Chr.	Chromosome 3 (human)
Band	3p14.1	Start	67,360,460 bp
Band	3p14.1	End	67,654,612 bp

Gene location (Mouse)
Chr.	Chromosome 6 (mouse)
Band	6 D2|6 44.63 cM	Start	95,449,990 bp
Band	6 D2|6 44.63 cM	End	95,695,781 bp
RNA expression pattern
Bgee	Human / Mouse (ortholog); Top expressed in: mucosa of colon; mucosa of sigmoid colon; rectum; jejunal mucosa; right lobe of liver; mucosa of transverse colon; duodenum; vastus lateralis muscle; gastrocnemius muscle; Skeletal muscle tissue of rectus abdominis / Top expressed in: right kidney; renal cortex; proximal tubule; human kidney; hepatobiliary system; liver; colon; heart; ileum; stomach; More reference expression data
BioGPS	n/a
Gene ontology
Molecular function	nucleotide binding; GTP binding; succinate-CoA ligase (GDP-forming) activity; ligase activity; catalytic activity; ATP binding; protein heterodimerization activity; GDP binding; metal ion binding; protein binding; magnesium ion binding; succinate-CoA ligase (ADP-forming) activity; succinate-CoA ligase activity
Cellular component	mitochondrial matrix; plasma membrane; mitochondrion; succinate-CoA ligase complex (GDP-forming); protein-containing complex; succinate-CoA ligase complex
Biological process	metabolism; tricarboxylic acid cycle; succinate metabolic process; succinyl-CoA metabolic process
Sources:Amigo / QuickGO
Orthologs
Species	Human	Mouse
Entrez	8801	20917
Ensembl	ENSG00000172340	ENSMUSG00000061838
UniProt	Q96I99	Q9Z2I8
RefSeq (mRNA)	NM_001177599; NM_003848	NM_011507; NM_001326558
RefSeq (protein)	NP_001171070; NP_003839	NP_001313487; NP_035637
Location (UCSC)	Chr 3: 67.36 – 67.65 Mb	Chr 6: 95.45 – 95.7 Mb
PubMed search
- Wikidata
View/Edit Human	View/Edit Mouse

Succinyl-CoA ligase [GDP-forming] subunit beta, mitochondrial is an enzyme that in humans is encoded by the SUCLG2 gene on chromosome 3.

This gene encodes a GTP-specific beta subunit of succinyl-CoA synthetase. Succinyl-CoA synthetase catalyzes the reversible reaction involving the formation of succinyl-CoA and succinate. Alternate splicing results in multiple transcript variants. Pseudogenes of this gene are found on chromosomes 5 and 12. [provided by RefSeq, Apr 2010]

== Structure ==
SCS, also known as succinyl CoA ligase (SUCL), is a heterodimer composed of a catalytic α subunit encoded by the SUCLG1 gene and a β subunit encoded by either the SUCLA2 gene or the SUCLG2 gene, which determines the enzyme specificity for either ADP or GDP. SUCLG2 is the SCS variant containing the SUCLG2-encoded β subunit. Amino acid sequence alignment of the two β subunit types reveals a homology of ~50% identity, with specific regions conserved throughout the sequences.

SUCLG2 is located on chromosome 3 and contains 14 exons.

== Function ==
As a subunit of SCS, SUCLG2 is a mitochondrial matrix enzyme that catalyzes the reversible conversion of succinyl-CoA to succinate and acetoacetyl CoA, accompanied by the substrate-level phosphorylation of GDP to GTP, as a step in the tricarboxylic acid (TCA) cycle. The GTP generated is then consumed in anabolic pathways. However, since GTP is not transported through the inner mitochondrial membrane in mammals and other higher organisms, it must be recycled within the matrix. In addition, SUCLG2 may function in ATP generation in the absence of SUCLA2 by complexing with the mitochondrial nucleotide diphosphate kinase, nm23-H4, and thus compensate for SUCLA2 deficiency. The reverse reaction generates succinyl-CoA from succinate to fuel ketone body and heme synthesis.

While SCS is ubiquitously expressed, SUCLG2 is predominantly expressed in tissues involved in biosynthesis, including liver and kidney. SUCLG2 has also been detected in the microvasculature of the brain, likely to support its growth. Notably, both SUCLA2 and SUCLG2 are absent in astrocytes, microglia, and oligodendrocytes in the brain; thus, in order to acquire succinate to continue the TCA cycle, these cells may instead synthesize succinate through GABA metabolism of α-ketoglutarate or ketone body metabolism of succinyl-CoA.

== Clinical significance ==
Though mitochondrial DNA (mtDNA) depletion syndrome has been largely attributed to SUCLA2 deficiency, SUCLG2 may play a more crucial role in mtDNA maintenance, as it functions to compensate for SUCLA2 deficiency and its absence results in decreased mtDNA and OXPHOS-dependent growth.

SUCLG2 may also play a role in clearing cerebrospinal fluid amyloid-beta 1–42 (Aβ1–42) in Alzheimer's disease (AD) and, thus, reducing neuronal death.

== See also ==
- Succinyl-CoA synthetase
- SUCLG1
- SUCLA2
