= Charlie Gard case =

2017 UK best interests legal case

Charlie Gard
- Born: Charles Matthew William Gard; 4 August 2016; London, UK
- Died: 28 July 2017 (aged 11 months 24 days)
- Cause of death: Mitochondrial DNA depletion syndrome
- Parents: Christopher Gard; Constance Yates

The Charlie Gard case was a best interests case in 2017 involving Charles Matthew William "Charlie" Gard (4 August 2016 – 28 July 2017), an infant boy from London, born with mitochondrial DNA depletion syndrome (MDDS), a rare genetic disorder that causes progressive brain damage and muscle failure. MDDS has no treatment and usually causes death in infancy. The case became controversial because the medical team and parents disagreed about whether experimental treatment was in the best interests of the child.

In October 2016, Charlie was transferred to London's Great Ormond Street Hospital (GOSH), a National Health Service (NHS) children's hospital, because he was failing to thrive and his breathing was shallow. He was placed on mechanical ventilation and MDDS was diagnosed.

A neurologist in New York, Michio Hirano, who was working on an experimental treatment based on nucleoside supplementation with human MDDS patients, was contacted. He and GOSH agreed to proceed with the treatment, to be conducted at GOSH and paid for by the NHS. Hirano was invited to come to the hospital to examine Charlie but did not visit at that time. In January, after Charlie had seizures that caused brain damage, GOSH formed the view that further treatment was futile and might prolong suffering. They began discussions with the parents about ending life support and providing palliative care.

Charlie's parents still wanted to try the experimental treatment and raised funds for a transfer to a hospital in New York. In February 2017, GOSH asked the High Court to override the parents' decision, questioning the potential of nucleoside therapy to treat Charlie's condition. The British courts supported GOSH's position. The parents appealed the case to the Court of Appeal, the Supreme Court and the European Court of Human Rights. The decision of the court at first instance was upheld at each appeal.

In July 2017, after receiving a letter signed by several international practitioners defending the potential of the treatment and claiming to provide new evidence, GOSH applied to the High Court for a new hearing. Hirano visited Charlie at GOSH during the second hearing of the case at the request of the judge. After examining scans of Charlie's muscles, Hirano determined it was too late for the treatment to help Charlie and the parents agreed to the withdrawal of life support. GOSH maintained its position throughout that Charlie's condition had deteriorated by January to the extent that the proposed experimental treatment was futile.

The second hearing at the High Court, which had been arranged to hear and examine the new evidence then became concerned with the arrangements for the withdrawal of life support. On 27 July, by consent, Charlie was transferred to a hospice, mechanical ventilation was withdrawn, and he died the next day at the age of 11 months and 24 days.

The case attracted widespread attention in Britain and around the world, with expressions of concern and assistance offered by figures including then U.S. President Donald Trump and Pope Francis. At the time of Charlie's death, The Washington Post wrote that the case "became the embodiment of a passionate debate over his right to live or die, his parents' right to choose for their child and whether his doctors had an obligation to intervene in his care".

== Treatment ==
Charles Matthew William Gard was born on 4 August 2016, at full term and normal weight, to Christopher Gard, a postman, and Constance Yates, a carer for young people with learning difficulties, both of Bedfont, west London. He seemed to develop normally at first, but his parents noticed after a few weeks that he was less able to lift his head, and they took him to his GP. On 2 October 2016, they reported that he was being breastfed every 2–3 hours but was not gaining weight. He was fed a high-calorie formula through a nasogastric tube, an ECG was carried out, and a cranial MRI scan was performed on 7 October.

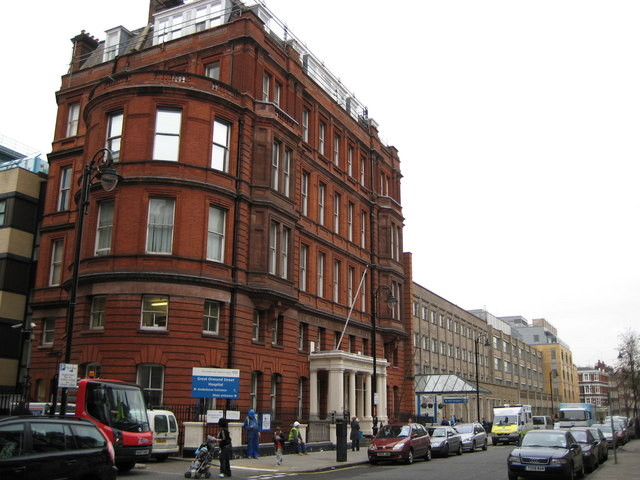
Part of Great Ormond Street Hospital, London

On 11 October, Charlie was taken to Great Ormond Street Hospital (GOSH) and put on a mechanical ventilator, because his breathing had become shallow. By November, the doctors suspected that he had mitochondrial DNA depletion syndrome (MDDS), a set of rare diseases caused by mutations in genes essential for mitochondria to function. This diagnosis was confirmed by a genetic test in mid-November, which found that he had two mutated versions of the gene coding for the RRM2B protein.

The gene for RRM2B is in the cell nucleus; the protein it codes is necessary for generating nucleosides that are used to make deoxyribonucleic acid (DNA) in mitochondria. The mitochondria fail in people lacking a functional version of this protein, causing brain damage, muscle weakness (including of the muscles used to breathe) and organ failure, and usually leading to death during infancy. Only 15 other cases of MDDS caused by mutations in RRM2B have been recorded. As of April 2017, there was only one experimental treatment for MDDS based on nucleoside supplementation, used on mice and human patients carrying a mutation in a different gene (TK2), which also impairs the synthesis of nucleosides in mitochondria causing a less severe form of MDDS.

The hospital's ethics committee advised in November 2016 that Charlie should not be given a tracheostomy. In mid-December, he began having persistent seizures as his brain function deteriorated. He had become deaf, his heart and kidneys were failing, and he could no longer breathe or move independently. It was unclear whether he could feel pain.

=== Experimental nucleoside treatment ===
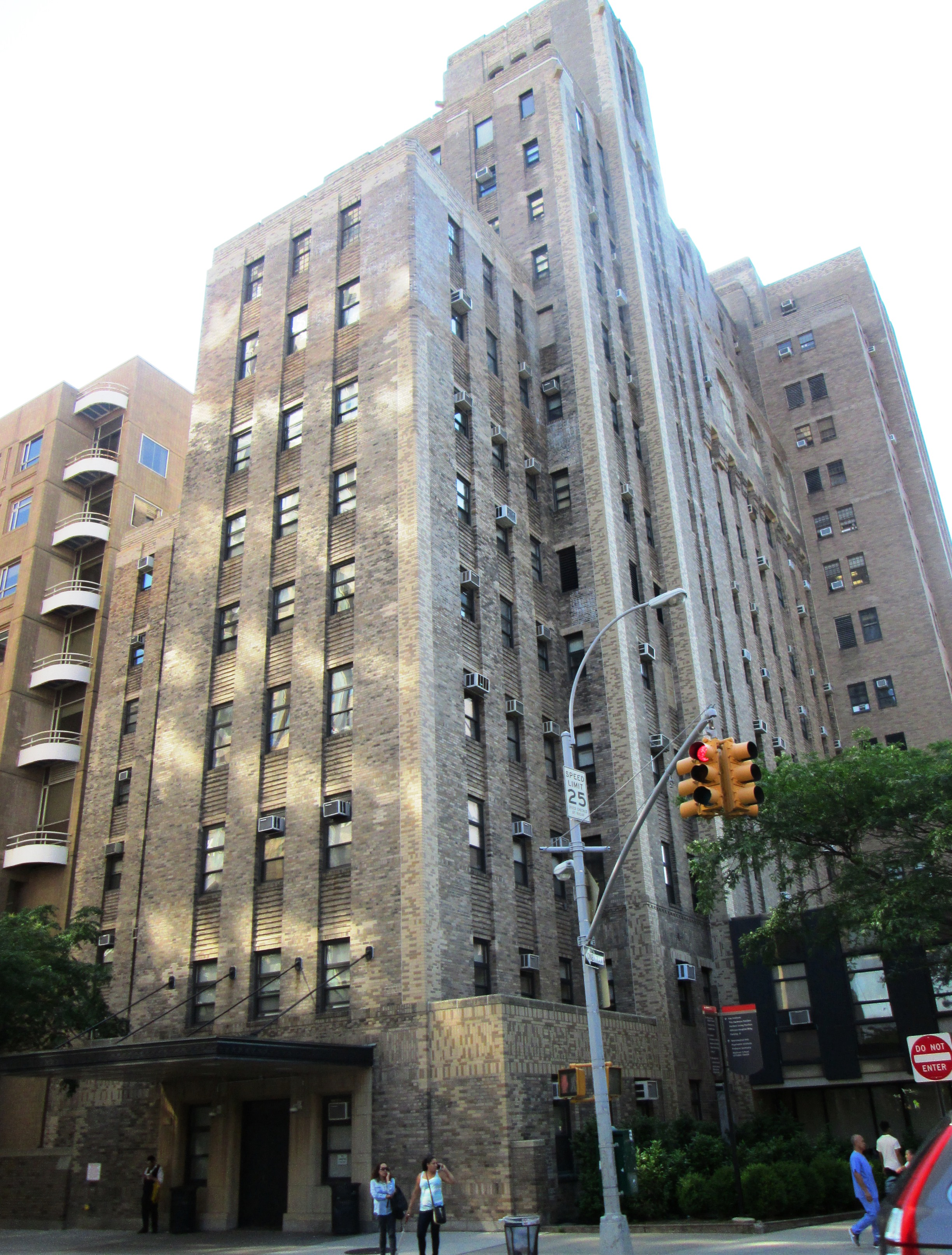
Neurological Institute of New York, Columbia University Medical Center

In December 2016, Michio Hirano, chief of the Division of Neuromuscular Disorders at Columbia University Medical Center, and an attending neurologist at New York–Presbyterian Hospital, who had worked on nucleoside therapy in collaboration with researchers in Italy, Spain and Central America, administering the therapy to 18 human patients, was contacted.

Charlie's records were sent electronically to Hirano on 30 December, and he and a member of the GOSH medical team discussed the case by telephone. Both doctors agreed that the experimental treatment was unlikely to help if there was irreversible brain damage. Hirano and the GOSH medical team continued to email and discuss the treatment by telephone. Hirano said there was a "theoretical possibility" that the treatment would provide some benefit, but that he needed a baseline MRI to rule out "severe brain involvement". An MRI was performed and seemed to show no structural damage to the brain.

On 9 January 2017, notes kept by GOSH doctors recorded that the team intended to attempt the nucleoside treatment at GOSH in the next few weeks. One of the doctors applied to the hospital's ethics committee for approval. A committee meeting was scheduled for 13 January, and Charlie was provisionally scheduled for a tracheostomy on 16 January. GOSH invited Hirano to examine him in January, but he did not examine Charlie until July.

On 9 or 10 January, Charlie began having epileptic seizures, which continued until 27 January. These were deemed likely to have caused epileptic encephalopathy (brain damage), and the 13 January ethics committee meeting was postponed. On 13 January, the GOSH doctors informed Charlie's parents that the brain damage had made the experimental treatment futile, and in light of the risk that he was suffering, they withdrew their support for it.

=== Termination of life support proposed and opposed ===
GOSH began discussing with the parents the ending of life support and the provision of palliative care. By this time, relations between the parents and the doctors had deteriorated. One GOSH doctor emailed another: "Parents are spanner in the works. Recent deterioration with worsening seizures means trial is not in his best interests." The email emerged in the subsequent court case; the judge said that he understood the distress it had caused the parents, but that it was important to view the email in the context of notes passed between consultants about Charlie's best interests. The parents disagreed with the doctors at GOSH; they wanted to take him to New York to receive the nucleoside treatment.

== Reactions ==
On 30 January 2017, the parents launched an appeal on the crowdfunding website GoFundMe to finance experimental treatment in the United States. Donations had exceeded £1.3 million by the end of April.

In June, immediately after the High Court had ruled that artificial life support should be withdrawn, the parents said that they wanted to take their son home to die or to bring him to a hospice, and that GOSH had denied this; the hospital would not comment due to Charlie's confidentiality. It was announced that his life support would be withdrawn on 30 June. The courts, and GOSH and its staff were subjected to criticism and abuse. On 30 June, the staff at the hospital agreed to give the parents more time with him.

Three days earlier, the appeal process finished when the European Court of Human Rights declined to hear the case and shortly after offers of assistance and expressions of support were made by U.S. President Donald Trump and Vice President Mike Pence. Congressmen Brad Wenstrup and Trent Franks announced that they intended to introduce legislation granting lawful permanent resident status in the U.S. to Charlie Gard and his family. "Our bill will support Charlie's parents' right to choose what is best for their son, by making Charlie a lawful permanent resident in the U.S. in order for him to receive treatments that could save his life. Should this little boy be ordered to die – because a third party, overriding the wishes of his parents, believes it can conclusively determine that immediate death is what is best for him?" Trump said the U.S. would be "delighted to help", Pence called Charlie's case "heartbreaking" and said that "the American people oughta^{[sic]} reflect on the fact that for all the talk on the left about single-payer, that's where it takes us". The case was cited in the American press and social media as evidence in the debate there about the Administration's promise to repeal the Patient Protection and Affordable Care Act (Obamacare). Some commentators in the United States erroneously argued that Charlie's plight was the result of the UK having a state-run national health service and that the decision to withdraw Charlie's life support was driven by cost. In London Alasdair Seton-Marsden, who acted as a spokesman for the parents until they distanced themselves from him, was criticised for using parental rights rhetoric, calling Charlie "a prisoner of the state". Pro-life groups in the United States became involved in the controversy, with US groups demonstrating outside the London court.

The Vatican issued a statement on 2 July affirming that "we should never act with the deliberate intention to end a human life" but that "we must also accept the limits of medicine". Pope Francis expressed solidarity with the parents, and said that their wishes should be respected, and human life should be protected. The Pope's remarks were widely reported as evidence that the Pope had altered the Vatican's position. It was said that the Pope offered citizenship. On 6 July, New York–Presbyterian Hospital issued a statement offering either to admit Charlie for treatment in New York or to provide the drug and advice to GOSH staff for the treatment in London. (Note: " New York–Presbyterian Hospital and Columbia University Irving Medical Center have agreed to admit and evaluate Charlie, provided that arrangements are made to safely transfer him to our facility, legal hurdles are cleared, and we receive emergency approval from the FDA for an experimental treatment as appropriate. Alternatively, if approved by the FDA, we will arrange shipment of the experimental drug to Great Ormond Street Hospital and advise their medical staff on administering it if they are willing to do so.) In a letter that was made public, was presented to and rejected by the Court of Appeal and was sent to GOSH, Hirano and other doctors claimed to be able to provide new evidence to support the view that Charlie should be given nucleoside treatment. A few days after the European court ruling on 28 June, the parents' solicitor wrote to GOSH arguing that the hospital had a duty to apply for a new hearing. Two other hospitals were willing to offer treatment; the Vatican-owned Bambino Gesù Hospital in Rome, and Hirano's New York–Presbyterian Hospital. The letter said that Hirano had new basic research findings that he judged made it more likely that the nucleoside therapy could help. At no time did Hirano or the New York hospital claim or imply that it was necessary to send Charlie to the United States; the experimental treatment could be administered at the GOSH, subject to the agreement in London of the ethics committee and of the Food and Drug Administration (FDA) in the United States. The ethics committee in London had declined consent and there is no public record of an application to the FDA being made. The parents said these expressions of support had given them new hope.

On 7 July 2017, GOSH made application for the case to return to the High Court. In a public statement, GOSH explained why it had applied: "Two international hospitals and their researchers have communicated to us as late as the last 24 hours that they have fresh evidence about their proposed experimental treatment. And we believe, in common with Charlie's parents, it is right to explore this evidence". The hospital stated it was bound by the previous ruling of the High Court, which expressly forbade them from transferring Charlie for nucleoside therapy anywhere, and the application was made to ask the Court to reconsider the case after weighing the evidence regarding the treatment, and specifically, its ability to cross the blood-brain barrier to treat Charlie's encephalopathy. In its application to the High Court for a second hearing GOSH said that the parents, through their solicitors "not for the first time raised the prospect of criminal proceedings against the hospital and its staff". (Note: "the hospital asks the court to affirm the declarations made 11/04/17 if necessary after hearing further evidence. In view of the unique situation that has developed, the hospital also asked the court to make orders in the same terms. The hospital would not normally seek orders and does so for the following reasons among others: in his judgement, Francis J said that it was in Charlie's best interests to be allowed to slip away peacefully. Decisions expressed as orders would better enable hospital to achieve that aim than would further declarations; the declarations have been interpreted by the White House, and thereafter by the parents through their solicitors, as permitting Charlie's transfer to another hospital for NBT treatment. Aside from the fact that the declarations say that treatment is not in Charlie's best interests. The hospital does not understand this line of reasoning but has no expectation that it would be possible to reach agreement about the legal effect of the declarations. Therefore orders are sought to remove any ambiguity; orders are enforceable. Despite all of the hospitals best endeavours, this appears as potentially necessary. Not for the first time the parents through their solicitors raised the prospect of criminal proceedings against the hospital and its staff. The Hospital understands that no court order best interests proceedings can afford it or its staff from prosecution.")

== Legal proceedings ==
Timeline of events
4 Aug 2016	Charlie born
11 Oct 2016	Charlie hospitalized with MDDS
mid-Dec 2016	Charlie begins having seizures, indicating worsening condition
30 Dec 2016	Hirano and GOSH discuss possible experimental treatment
mid-Jan 2017	Worsening seizures indicate brain damage, cause GOSH staff to believe treatment is futile
30 Jan 2017	Parents begin fundraiser for treatment
24 Feb 2017	GOSH asks UK court to order change from ventilator to palliative care
11 April 2017	UK court orders change from ventilator to palliative care
23 May 2017	Court of Appeal dismisses parents' claim
8 June 2017	Justices deny appeal to the Supreme Court
27 June 2017	European Court of Human Rights declines case
17 July 2017	Medical experts, including Hirano, conclude treatment is futile
24 July 2017	Parents formally withdraw opposition to palliative care
25 July 2017	UK court affirms order to change from ventilator to palliative care
28 July 2017	Charlie dies

The court proceedings were under the inherent jurisdiction of the High Court (wardship), conducted within the principles and provisions of the Children Act 1989.

In wardship, the High Court assumes parental rights and responsibilities if an application is made and the court deems the application appropriate. Parents and public bodies have a responsibility to take actions in the best interests of a child. Doctors treat children with the consent of parents; treatment of a child without parental consent potentially exposes the treating doctor to criminal prosecution. If a public body believes a parental decision will cause significant harm to a child, it must ask the courts to intervene to override the parents' decision. It is the duty of the court under its inherent jurisdiction to ensure that a child who is the subject of proceedings is protected and properly taken care of. There is a presumption for transparency in these cases as the justified interference with article 8 rights of a minor will always require public scrutiny at some point. The law in respect of transparency in wardship and inherent jurisdiction cases is complex.

The principles and provisions of the Children Act 1989 that are particularly relevant to this case are: (Note: Sec 3(1) "....parental responsibility" means all the rights, duties, powers, responsibilities and authority which by law a parent of a child has in relation to the child and his property. Sec 1(1) "When a court determines any question with respect to the upbringing of a child the child's welfare shall be the court's paramount consideration." Sec 1(5) "Where a court is considering whether or not to make one or more orders under this Act with respect to a child, it shall not make the order or any of the orders unless it considers that doing so would be better for the child than making no order at all." Sec 2 "...the court shall have regard to the general principle that any delay in determining the question is likely to prejudice the welfare of the child".)

- the definitions of parental rights and responsibilities,
- the paramountcy and the definition of the child's best interests,
- the "no order" principle and
- the "no delay" principle

In essence, GOSH had applied for a Specific Issue Order under section 8 of the Act to enable life support to be withdrawn. GOSH believed this to be in Charlie's best interests but his parents did not. The judge dealt with the case throughout by Declarations; at no stage of the proceedings was any Mandatory Order made. This caused problems both for GOSH, described in their later formal application of 7 July^{see below} and for the Supreme Court.^{see below}

=== First directions hearings ===
On 24 February 2017, GOSH asked the High Court to exercise its inherent jurisdiction. GOSH sought orders:

1. That Charlie lacked capacity to make decisions regarding his medical treatment;
2. That artificial ventilation be withdrawn;
3. That it is lawful for his treating clinicians to provide him with palliative care only; and
4. That it is lawful, and in Charlie's best interests, not to undergo nucleoside therapy.

The case came before the court on 3 March. It was then listed for final hearing on 3 April to enable the parents to file their evidence, and in particular to obtain evidence from the USA, as to the treatment that might possibly be available for Charlie.

The parents were not automatically eligible for legal aid; it is unclear whether they would have been eligible under an exemption, but they did not apply to the Legal Aid Agency. They were represented by a pro bono legal team, which the judge later characterized as "experienced and dedicated" and as providing "excellent assistance". Charlie was joined as a party and a guardian ad litem was appointed under the Children and Family Court Advisory and Support Service (CAFCASS). In this way the first of GOSH's applications was granted by consent. Victoria Butler-Cole, a barrister, represented the guardian. The Telegraph later reported that the parents "privately expressed their concern" when they realised that Butler-Cole is the chair of Compassion in Dying, a sister organisation of Dignity in Dying.

At this stage agreed reporting restriction orders were in place to protect the anonymity of the medical team and those that have given second opinions, both from the UK and abroad. The restrictions in respect of Hirano were lifted by consent at the second hearing.

=== First evidential hearing ===
The first hearing took place on 3, 5, 7 and 11 April at what was then thought to be a full and final hearing. The court heard testimony from two doctors and two nurses from GOSH, four doctors from whom GOSH had sought second opinions, from a doctor appointed as expert witness by the parents with the court's permission, and from Hirano by telephone from the US. All of the UK doctors bar one gave written and oral evidence; one gave written evidence only. Doctors from GOSH testified that withdrawing treatment complied with Royal College of Paediatrics and Child Health guidelines. The conclusions of the doctor appointed by the parents was said by the judge to coincide with the opinions of the other UK doctors.

Of the evidence of the UK doctors the judge said:

the entire highly experienced UK team, all those who provided second opinions and the consultant instructed by the parents in these proceedings share a common view that further treatment would be futile.

Hirano testified, like the other doctors involved, anonymously. He described his work with people and mice with the TK2-mutation form of MDDS, reporting that the patients under the treatment improved muscular strength, becoming less dependent on ventilators, and did not develop seizures compared to those not receiving nucleoside supplements. He said the therapy was unlikely to reverse structural brain damage, but that if the case were at his hospital, he would be willing to offer the treatment if the parents so desired and could pay for it, but he would defer first to the intensive care unit to make the decision.

Hirano had not seen Charlie but had had access to the medical records. Hirano had discussed the case on the telephone with some of the UK doctors and these discussions were relayed to the court. The judge quoted from Hirano's evidence

It is very difficult for me never having seen him, being across the Atlantic and seeing bits of information. I appreciate how unwell he is. His EEG is very severe. I think he is in the terminal stage of his illness. I can appreciate your position. I would just like to offer what we can. It is unlikely to work, but the alternative is that he will pass away.

Of Hirano's evidence, the judge said:

The long and the short of Dr. (Hirano's) evidence is that there is no scientific evidence of any prospect of any improvement in a human with RRM2B strain of MDDS. While there were some reasons to be hopeful that it might make a modest difference to life expectancy, it almost certainly could not undo structural brain damage.

The parents testified that they believed the nucleoside therapy could work, and that his brain damage was not as severe as the doctors thought. Whilst none of those giving evidence could be certain whether or not Charlie could experience pain the consensus was that he could but that he was not able to express feelings of pain.

The court appointed guardian testified that because of the risk that Charlie was in pain, and the low chance that the treatment would work, it was in his best interests to withdraw mechanical ventilation. On 11 April, Mr Justice Francis ruled by Declaration that he acceded to GOSH's application. It was in Charlie's best interests to withdraw mechanical ventilation and provide palliative care only and he refused the parents permission to appeal. The next day solicitors for the parents announced that they were considering the terms of the judgement; the parents had less than three weeks to lodge an appeal. Notice of Appeal was issued on 2 May and the case came before the Court of Appeal on 22 and 23 May.

=== Appeals ===
==== Court of Appeal ====
By Notice, the parents, represented by a completely different legal team also acting pro bono, sought leave to appeal the High Court ruling on five grounds:

1. The judge erred in making an order that prevented Charlie from receiving medical treatment by expert physicians in a reputable hospital overseas in circumstances where there was no risk of that treatment causing significant harm to Charlie.
  1. Per Re King, the court may not interfere with a decision by parents in the exercise of their parental rights and responsibilities with regard to their child's medical treatment, save where there is a risk the parents' proposed course of action may cause significant harm. Re King is good law. It is consistent with prior authorities and correct as a matter of principle. It was cited in argument but not addressed at all in the judgment.
2. The judge had no jurisdiction to grant an order on the application of one clinical team preventing a second clinical team from carrying out a treatment that the latter had offered in the reasonable exercise of its professional judgment. The declaration made by the judge has de facto injunctive effect in that it prevents Charlie's parents from removing from GOSH to undergo treatment in the USA.
  1. The judge would have had no power to grant such an injunction, had one been sought. It is no part of GOSH's statutory function to prevent other clinical teams from carrying out reasonable treatments. GOSH has nevertheless obtained an order with substantially the same effect
3. The judge fell into error in conducting the ordinary "best interests" evaluation.
4. No, or insufficient, regard was had to the relevant rights of Charlie and the parents under Articles 2, 5 and 8 of the European Convention on Human Rights.
5. The parents and their legal team were placed at an unfair procedural disadvantage as a result of the late disclosure of documents.

The court granted permission for the parents to appeal on ground 1, 2 and 4, and refused permission for ground 3 (no prospect of success), and ground 5 (no evidence). Having refused permission to appeal on ground three, the court went on to assess grounds 1, 2 and 4 on the basis that the judge at first instance had correctly evaluated Charlie's best interests and the lack of any identifiable benefit for him arising from nucleoside treatment. A letter dated 22 May from Hirano was submitted to the court as "fresh evidence". The court read the letter and noted its contents but stated "It is, however, plain that the letter does not purport to contain anything new". By grounds 1 and 2 the parents attempted to establish a "wholly new point of law" – all previously decided and reported medical treatment of children cases, save and except for that of Re King, should be regarded as "Category 1", whilst Re King established a "Category 2". In a "Category 1" case the parents who oppose the course of treatment for which the treating clinicians apply, and do not have a viable alternative therapeutic option to put before the court. The distinction that would lead a case to be allocated to "Category 2" is that a viable alternative treatment option is put forward by the parents and the court is, therefore, required to choose between the two. The court rejected this argument. The judge at first instance was required to evaluate Charlie's best interests and had done so. Lord Justice McFarlane said "On the facts of this case in my view, Mr Gordon's submission, unfortunately for the parents, does not even begin to have traction. The submission is based upon there being a viable alternative form of treatment available." Of the "wholly new point of law" Lord Justice McFarlane said "If, contrary to my primary reading, Mr Justice Baker did intend to state, where a parent puts forward a viable option for treatment, that the High Court only has jurisdiction to interfere with a parent's choice of that medical treatment if the child is likely to suffer significant harm as a result, then, in my view, such a statement has no foundation as a matter of law, is contrary to established authority and is therefore plainly in error." As the appeal on grounds 1 and 2 were dismissed so the appeal on ground 4 fell. The parents' appeal was dismissed.

==== Supreme Court ====
On 8 June, at an oral hearing, a panel of three justices at the Supreme Court heard an application by the parents for permission to appeal to the Supreme Court. The parents argued that in this sort of case the hospital can only interfere in the decision taken by the parents if the child is otherwise likely to suffer significant harm and that decisions taken by parents who agree with one another are non-justiciable; that parents and parents alone are the judges of their child's best interests. Any other approach would interfere with their status their rights under Article 8 of the European Convention on Human Rights. Of this the court said that applications such as this are governed by statute; the welfare of the child shall be the paramount consideration. This provision reflects but is stronger than Article 3.1 of the United Nations Convention on the Rights of the Child. Also, where there is a significant dispute about a child's best interests the child himself must have an independent voice in that dispute and in this case Charlie has been represented by a guardian.

Permission to appeal was refused on the grounds that there was no arguable point of law; the court also ordered reporting restrictions.

The matter again came before the Supreme Court on 19 June. The parents had applied to the European Court of Human Rights. That court routinely joins the relevant National Government to the case and it had requested the government to apply for a stay of the Declarations of the judge at first instance. The court sought that the judge's declarations be stayed to allow it time to hear the appeal. The Supreme Court had said at its earlier hearing that it had no authority in respect of a Declaration, additionally the application to stay caused it to face the unique dilemma of, in effect, acting against Charlie's best interests. (Note: At paragraph 2 of the court's judgement Lady Hale stated "By that judgment, this court explained why it had decided to refuse permission to the parents to appeal to it against the order of the Court of Appeal dated 25 May 2017. But its refusal was subject to a reservation of jurisdiction to grant a further stay of the declarations dated 11 April 2017. There is a logical problem about a stay of a declaration (as opposed to an order) but this is no time to wrestle with it. As is agreed, the practical effect of any stay would be that, for as long as it continued, it would not be unlawful for the doctors and other staff at Great Ormond Street Hospital ("the hospital") to continue to provide artificial ventilation, nutrition and hydration ("AVNH") so as to keep Charlie Gard alive. At paragraph 17 "We three members of this court find ourselves in a situation which, so far as we can recall, we have never previously experienced. By granting a stay, even of short duration, we would in some sense be complicit in directing a course of action which is contrary to Charlie's best interests.")

==== European Court of Human Rights ====
On 19 June the parents lodged an application to the European Court of Human Rights. The application was heard on 27 June and declared inadmissible.

=== Second directions and evidential hearings ===
On 7 July, GOSH applied to the High Court for a further hearing. The formal application asked the court to evaluate the claims made about new evidence and it set out the difficulties that the hospital had experienced with the Declarations made by the judge on 11 April.

On Monday 10 July, the case again came before Mr Justice Francis. GOSH disputed claims made by Charlie's parents that there was new evidence; it had been forced to come back to court after lawyers for the parents had threatened judicial review. The parents asked for a further full hearing in two weeks time and they asked the judge to step down on the basis that he had already made up his mind. These applications were both rejected. The judge said he was the best person to evaluate any new evidence; he had heard the case thus far and he promised the parents a fair hearing. He would deal with the case on the basis of evidence not tweets. He expressed an understanding of the parents position "I understand parents will grasp at any possibility of hope." Of the requested two-week delay he said "doctors and nurses were under 'extreme strain' with the case dragging on ... Staff feel it is desperately unfair to Charlie ... week after week knowing that every step they take for Charlie is against his welfare." Directions were given for a further hearing on Thursday 13 July, asking the parents to set out any new evidence they had on the day before.

On 13 and 14 July the parents' fresh evidence, set out in a letter sent by the parents' legal team to GOSH a few days after the decision of the European court, was presented to the court. The new evidence was summarised as:

1. the Bambino Gesu Children's Hospital, Rome is willing to accept the transfer of Charlie;
2. Dr. Hirano and the associated medical centre in the USA remain willing to accept the transfer of Charlie;
3. on the basis of new laboratory findings, Dr. Hirano considers:
  1. the likelihood of a positive effect and benefits to Charlie of the proposed nucleoside therapy to be markedly improved compared to the views expressed in court;
  2. the likelihood that the proposed nucleoside therapy will cross the blood brain barrier to be significantly enhanced.

In spite of these assertions, Dr. Hirano had still not seen Charlie, had never physically assessed Charlie nor had he had sight of his medical records and investigations, including the second opinions of doctors from outside GOSH. The judge later said of this "It seems to me to be a remarkably simple proposition that if a doctor is to give evidence to this court about the prospect of effective treatment in respect of a child whose future is being considered by the court, that Dr should see the patient before the court can sensibly rely upon his evidence." Hirano gave evidence by videolink from America. By consent, the reporting restrictions of his identity were lifted and he agreed to travel to London to examine Charlie and to take part in a conference with the GOSH medical team and other experts. Mr Justice Francis arranged to hear further evidence after a medical conference of experts from around the world, including Hirano had been conducted on 17 July. The judge said he would issue a new ruling on 25 July, after he had received and reviewed the conference report. The judge said of the report that there was a considerable degree of consensus but further MRI scans were needed to establish whether the position that GOSH had for some time been maintaining is correct. It transpired that in some places Charlie had no muscle and in other places there is significant replacement of muscle by fat. On 24 July, the barrister representing Chris Gard and Connie Yates withdrew their request to fly their son to New York and their challenge to withdrawing mechanical ventilation and proceeding with palliative care. He added that Chris and Connie had made the decision on 21 July but had wanted to spend the weekend with their son without media attention.

On 24 July, Mr Justice Francis said "Given the consensus that now exists between parents, the treating doctors and even Dr Hirano, it is my very sad duty to confirm the declarations that I made in April this year, and I now formally do so. I do not make a Mandatory Order."

In spite of the consensus identified by the judge at the end of the five-day hearing, it was at times acrimonious. The judge had been asked to step down and responded in his written judgement (Note: From the outset of this second hearing, I made it clear that I could only change the decision that I made on 11 April on the basis of compelling new evidence. No one has sought to assert that this approach is incorrect, nor could they, given the detailed judgment that I gave in April, having considered all of the medical evidence, and the review of that judgment by the three layers of appeal to which I have already referred. I also made it clear that I could only consider the case on the basis of evidence and not on the basis of partially informed or ill-informed opinion, however eminent the source of that opinion. I made it clear that I would always listen carefully to any new and material evidence. The world of social media doubtless has very many benefits but one of its pitfalls, I suggest, is that when cases such as this go viral, the watching world feels entitled to express opinions, whether or not they are evidence-based. When I became a judge, I took the same oath that all judges in England and Wales take and I promised to do right to all manner of people after the laws and usages of this Realm. When jurors are sworn in in criminal trials they promise to try the case according to the evidence. I have at all times endeavoured to remain faithful to that oath, to apply the law having heard and considered the evidence.) in what was seen as a swipe against U.S. President Trump, who had tweeted about the case. On the last day Connie Yates made a statement to the court from the witness box. This statement (Note: The last 11, nearly 12, months have been the best, the worst and ultimately most life-changing months of our lives. But Charlie is Charlie and we wouldn't change him for the world. All our efforts have been for him. This is one of the hardest things that we will ever have to say, and we are about to do the hardest thing that we'll ever have to do, which is to let our beautiful little Charlie go. Put simply, this is about a sweet, gorgeous, innocent little boy who was born with a rare disease, who had a real, genuine chance at life and a family who love him so very dearly, and that's why we fought so hard for him. We are truly devastated to say that following the most recent MRI scan of Charlie's muscles, as requested in the recent MDT meeting (multidisciplinary team meeting of those caring for Charlie) by Dr Hirano, as Charlie's devoted and loving parents we have decided that it's no longer in Charlie's best interests to pursue treatment and we will let our son go and be with the angels. There is one simple reason for Charlie's muscles deteriorating to the extent they are in now – time. A whole lot of wasted time. We would like to say a few words in the hope that Charlie's life will not be in vain. We have always acted in our son's best interests from the very beginning. We have always been led by Charlie. I promise every single one of you that we would not have fought this hard for our son if we thought that he was in pain or suffering. There has never been any proof that he was and we still don't think that he's in pain or suffering to this day. Having said that, we have decided to let our son go and that's for one reason and one reason only. It is because the prospect of improvement is unfortunately now too low for Charlie. Our doctors in America and Italy were still willing to treat Charlie after reviewing the MRI head scan from July 2017 as they still felt that there was a chance of meaningful improvement in Charlie's brain. However, due to the deterioration in his muscles, there is now no way back for Charlie. Time has been wasted. It is time that has sadly gone against him. Now we will never know what would have happened if he got treatment, but it's not about us. It's never been about us. It's about what's best for Charlie now. At the point in time when it has become too late for Charlie we have made the agonising decision to let him go. This has also never been about "parents know best". We have continuously listened to experts in this field and it has raised fundamental issues, ethically, legally and medically – this is why the story of one little boy from two normal everyday people has raised such conflicting opinions and ferocious arguments worldwide. We will always know in our hearts that we did the very best for Charlie and I hope that he is proud of us for fighting his corner. We will have to live with the "what ifs", which will haunt us for the rest of our lives. But we're thinking about what's best for our son. We have always believed that Charlie deserved a chance at life and we knew that his brain was not as bad it was made out to be, and that's why we continued.) and GOSH's position statement and press releases of 24 and 27 July make clear the distance that remained between the parents and the hospital medical team. The parents accused GOSH of delaying treatment until it was too late, with the mother complaining that the world-renowned children's hospital had "wasted time" in refusing to allow doctors from abroad to treat her son. The parents later accused the hospital of blocking their 'final wish' for Charlie to be allowed home to die.

Charlie's parents wanted to move him to private care and wanted to wait a "week or so" before they ended mechanical ventilation. The hospital objected on the basis that he needed intensive care and that mechanical ventilation should be ended soon. The case returned to the judge on 25 and 26 July. The parents, the hospital and the guardian had explored five different plans and proposals for Charlie's final care and had explored all the various practical and logistic complications. The parties had been unable to reach agreement. The judge then set out by Declaration that the following arrangements be implemented:

1. Charlie shall continue to be treated at GOSH for the period of the Confidential Annexe hereto
2. Charlie shall be transferred to an agreed hospice the details of which are set out in a Confidential Annexe
3. It is lawful for artificial ventilation to be withdrawn after a period set out in the Confidential Annexe

Further directions were given to protect the confidentiality of the arrangements and to prevent reporting or publishing any information that would lead to identification.

== Outcome ==
On 27 July 2017 Charlie was transferred to a hospice and the next day his mother announced at 6:30 pm that he had died. The mechanical ventilator had been withdrawn; he was given morphine to relieve any pain beforehand, and died within minutes.

== Issues ==
=== Political and public policy ===
Medical experts criticised interventions by Hirano and others for raising the parents' hopes and for causing delays to the process. Genetics expert Robert Winston said "interferences from the Vatican and from Donald Trump" were "extremely unhelpful and very cruel". Winston added: "This child has been dealt with at a hospital which has huge expertise in mitochondrial disease and is being offered a break in a hospital that has never published anything on this disease, as far as I'm aware." Some commentators in the United States argued that Charlie's plight was the result of the UK having a state-run national health service and that the decision to withdraw Charlie's life support was driven by cost. The High Court judge described these comments as "nonsensical", adding that "it was one of the pitfalls of social media that the watching world felt it right to have opinions without knowing the facts of the case". The chairman of GOSH made a statement condemning "thousands of abusive messages", including death threats received by staff at the hospital and harassment of other families in the hospital over the preceding weeks. GOSH asked the Metropolitan Police Service to investigate the abuse. The parents issued a statement condemning harassment of GOSH staff and said they had also received abusive messages. GOSH released a statement criticising Hirano for offering testimony without having physically examined Charlie and without review of the medical records; they also said Hirano had disclosed that he had a financial interest in the treatment very late in the process. Hirano made a statement in response saying that he had relinquished his financial rights in the treatment.

=== Experimental treatment ===
A key issue in Charlie's case was access to experimental treatment. Requests for access to experimental treatment from patients or their family can sometimes occur when circumstances are dire. In the US the medical establishment handles these requests under "expanded access" or "compassionate use", which examines whether there is a reasonable chance of more benefit than harm for the patient; the extent of need; fairness; and the resources of everyone involved, including the people providing and administering the drug. US insurance companies generally do not pay for experimental treatment. In Charlie's case, the GOSH medical team initially decided to try the experimental treatment which would have been funded by the NHS, had it gone ahead.

The question was whether it was in Charlie's best interests to receive nucleoside therapy – whether the benefits were likely to outweigh the harm. Because the therapy was unproven, and had never been tested on a patient with Charlie's condition, the GOSH medical team and the courts focused on whether it was plausible that there could be of any benefit. Hirano told the court that having seen 30 March EEG, the damage to Charlie's brain was more severe than he had thought. He said in his evidence that the treatment was unlikely to be of any benefit to Charlie's brain. He agreed that there could be no reversal of the structure of Charlie's brain. He said that the main functioning would be improvement of weakness; some patients had improved their upper strength and four of eight patients had been able to reduce their time on ventilators, but he agreed that the effect on brain function would be less or minimal or non-existent. He said that the chances of meaningful brain recovery would be small, he described the probability as low, but not zero; he agreed he could not distinguish from vanishingly small. He said that he thought that there was only a small chance of meaningful brain function. He said that he was "in unchartered^{[sic]} territory, especially as we do not know how much structural damage there has been". He conceded that to a large extent, if not altogether, the damage was irreversible. GOSH had determined that the chances of benefit to Charlie were vanishingly small, the effort would be futile and the treatment potentially painful for him.

Hospitals in the US make the same kind of plausibility analysis when they consider experimental treatment. New York–Presbyterian Hospital would have needed approval to give Charlie the nucleoside therapy under the US compassionate-use framework. Charlie's parents felt any chance to save his life was worth trying. Their attempt to take Charlie to New York began when the London Hospital did not obtain approval to administer the experimental treatment – there was no question of its medical or technical inability to administer the treatment. Had Charlie travelled to New York a similar regulatory process would have been required. This point was not raised within the court process; the case proceeded, both in court and in the wider public debate, on the basis that the experimental treatment was not available in London but was available in New York. In evidence in April Hirano had said that he would defer to "ICU people", i.e he would not administer the experimental treatment if the intensivists at his hospital advised against it, as the GOSH ethics committee had in November 2016 and intensivists at GOSH had in January 2016.

After Charlie's death, The New York Times observed that only rarely is there such intense conflict between doctors and parents. CAFCASS reports that in England, it was involved in 18 parent-doctor disputes in 2016 that ended up in court. Hospitals discussed existing methods that have proved effective for avoiding disputes over children's care.

=== Medical ethics ===
Some medical ethicists saw the use of social media in this case as a challenge for their profession. Charlie's parents used social media to gain public support, but the medical team was limited in what it could say due to confidentiality obligations, and public opinion had no place in its decisions or procedures. During the court proceedings the ethical approaches to experimental treatment in the US and UK were compared in the media. Case law in the US has tended to favour families' perception of what is in their relative's best interests. Doctors in the US are less inclined to go to court when there are disagreements, but may find themselves providing care or treatment they believe is unethical. Some state law strongly favours families, but Texas, for example, allows doctors to bring cases to an ethics committee if they believe a treatment is futile, and they can be released from the obligation to provide such treatment. (Note: In the UK, judges are appointed by independent selection committees (there are no popular elections or political appointments of judges in the UK, unlike in the United States). Courts in the UK have no role in judicial review of legislation passed by parliament, so they are less involved in "political" matters than in the US.)

Public and ethicist's commentary continued as the case progressed through the courts. The public commentary changed little. Apart from the political comments about socialised medicine, single-payer health systems etc., the majority of public comment concentrated on the rights of the parents to make the medical choices for their child; on what was seen as the usurping nature of the court case. There were many claims that the court decisions were ordering or sanctioning euthanasia.

The case has been classified by a legal academic as a 'stigmata case', cases that "are part of the meditation of a culture upon itself."

==== Autonomy ====
Some ethicists said or implied either that the parents and the doctors should have agreed or that it was regrettable that they had not agreed or that they surely would have agreed had neither side had access to lawyers. Professor Julian Savulescu, Uehiro Professor of Practical Ethics at the University of Oxford, and Professor Dominic Wilkinson, Director of Medical Ethics at the Oxford Uehiro Centre for Practical Ethics and Consultant neonatologist at the John Radcliffe Hospital in Oxford opined that it is necessary for a court to decide the issues in circumstances of disagreement between the parents and the doctors if the disagreement is unreasonable but if the disagreement is reasonable the parents' decisions should prevail. Richard Doerflinger, former Associate Director of Pro-Life Activities of the U.S. Conference of Catholic Bishops, views it differently; "Catholic documents say the patient is the primary decision-maker; then loved ones who can speak for the patient; then doctors. These documents seldom mention judges. ... The American tradition reflects Catholic teaching." This conflicts with the statements issued in Rome by Archbishop Vincenzo Paglia, president of the Pontifical Academy for Life, and the two statements issued in London by the catholic Bishops' Conference of England and Wales but Doerflinger certainly reflects the American tradition. Both the Holy See and the United Kingdom are parties to the United Nations Convention on the Rights of the Child. The United States is a signatory but remains the only member state not to have ratified the convention. Its disinclination to do so is characterised in a U.S. Senate Resolution of 10 March 2011.

Wilkinson argued that the dominant legal approach in the US is unreasonable. "It either assumes that parents are infallible and always make the best decisions for their child. Or it assumes that children are the property of their parents, who may make whatever decisions they like about them." Wilkinson also argued that the disagreement in this case between the doctors and the parents was unreasonable and argued that the doctors and the courts were right to have withheld the experimental treatment. Savulescu argued that the disagreement was reasonable and that the parents' decision should have prevailed.

Raanan Gillon, Emeritus Professor of medical ethics at Imperial College London, President of the Institute of Medical Ethics, had argued similarly on the BBC radio Programme The Moral Maze on 12 July. Wilkinson also appeared on that programme, which was broadcast on the evening before the second evidential hearing at the High Court. Gillon said that the court was susceptible to ethical criticism and that in his opinion it had made the wrong decision. He argued that many children were being kept alive by artificial ventilation and that the accompanying pain and discomfort, which could be ameliorated, was not sufficient reason to override the parents right to decide. Wilkinson was more circumspect. He declined to say whether he thought the court had been right or wrong – he did not believe that he knew sufficient of the medical facts and he doubted that anyone other than those involved in the case did either. He drew on his regular working experience in a paediatric intensive care unit and stressed the need for doctors to listen to parents, to work to understand their views and to retain the trust of parents. Wilkinson stressed the continual worry that practitioners in his field had about the balance between the pain of treatment against its possible or potential benefits. He stressed that ventilation and suction were painful intrusive procedures.

The majority of these opinions were promulgated before the second evidential hearing in the High Court or before the full judgement was published.

==== Beneficence and non-maleficence ====
Savulescu's view that the parents' disagreement with the doctors was reasonable was based in part on the argument that the prospect of benefit offered by the proposed experimental treatment, albeit small, offered more than death. In his opinion, the benefits outweighed any harm – modern medicine is such that the pain and suffering caused by the artificial ventilation and suction would be ameliorated. Professor Savulescu's views in this regard were in accord with Professor Gillon's. Both Savulescu and Wilkinson had earlier argued against the notion of a 'best interest' argument to support the withdrawal of artificial life support. "Dominic Wilkinson and I have argued that although futility is often said to refer to 'best interests', it is more appropriately interpreted as a justice justification for limitation, that is, (the probability of the treatment prolonging life, or the quality of life, or the length of time the patient can survive are too low to justify the cost of the attempt (distributive justice)). ... The reason we have argued this is that the best interests justification [that continued life is no longer in the patient's interests] requires that doctors establish that life is no longer worth living. That is, that the person would be better off dead."

Wilkinson argues that the 'vanishingly small' possibility of benefit from the experimental treatment must be weighed against the "significant negatives in the balance. Those negatives can arise from the child's illness, or from the medical treatment. ... Being kept alive in intensive care is not pleasant. Although we do our best to provide pain relief, sedation, care and comfort to gravely ill children and babies, that ability is finite and imperfect. Children on long-term ventilation often appear uncomfortable at least part of the time. They have frequent needles and invasive procedures. They may be distressed and unable to communicate the source of their distress. ... Sadly, reluctantly, doctors and judges do sometimes conclude and are justified in concluding that slim chances of life are not always better than dying. Providing comfort, avoiding painful and unhelpful medical treatments, supporting the child and family for their remaining time. Sometimes that is the best that we can do, and the only ethical course."

==== Justice ====
===== Resources =====
Gillon, in the Moral Maze programme accepted the proposition that there could have been a resources argument against the use of the proposed experimental treatment but said that this was not a relevant issue in Charlie's case because the parents had raised sufficient funds to pay for the treatment. This was accepted by Wilkinson in the same programme. But Robert D. Truog, director, Harvard Center for Bioethics, Frances Glessner Lee Professor of Legal Medicine, Professor of Anaesthesia (Pediatrics) argued that the notion that Charlie's parents are paying is misleading. Tertiary care medical centres able to do research and provide care depend on communal investment made by society over decades. Society always has a financial stake in how communal services are used and has a legitimate claim in insisting that these resources be used wisely and for the benefit of all. "No one can demand non-beneficial treatments simply by claiming that they are paying out-of-pocket." It has been argued that the case had a negative impact on distributive justice, as Great Ormond Street Hospital incurred legal costs of £205,000, including VAT (money diverted from medical care to lawyers), and that distributive justice could be harmed further if proposed reforms known as 'Charlie's Law' (which would replace the best interests test with a significant harm test) are enacted.

===== Law =====
The legal proceedings commenced in March, some two months after Charlie's treating doctors formed the view that artificial life support was inimical to his interests, and were concluded four months later. The 'No Delay' principle of the Children Act 1989 was in conflict with the duty of the courts to do justice by all the parties. The parents had a right to contest the matter and to take it through the three appeal stages. When they later claimed to have new evidence GOSH was bound to return the matter to court. The delays were lamented repeatedly throughout the case. Lady Hale in the Supreme Court "By granting a stay, even of short duration, we would in some sense be complicit in directing a course of action which is contrary to Charlie's best interests." Savulescu, "This delay, if caused by the ethics process, would be another example of 'lethal ethics'". It has been argued that Charlie's best interests would have been better served had the experimental treatment been administered at GOSH in January. Prof. Savulescu, in a paper entitled "The Moral of the Case of Charlie Gard: Give Dying Patients Experimental Treatment ... Early" Prof. Wilkinson later came to a similar view. "In retrospect, it would have been better for Charlie to have received the requested treatment 6 months ago than to have a protracted legal dispute (with continued treatment in intensive care anyway)." By 6 July, a few days before the second evidential hearing of the case, Prof. Wilkinson had aligned himself with Savulescu's utilitarian view. but his view remained that "the doctors were right to oppose experimental treatment for Charlie in January, the judges were right to decline the family's request for treatment in April, and [that] it would be deeply ethically problematic to provide the treatment now". He cites two reasons for these views; "Experimental treatment for Charlie Gard is associated with significant side effects such that it is highly likely not to be in his interests to provide it." and that "in January [the Doctors] could not have predicted that 6 months and 4 court judgments later treatment would still be continuing".

== Summary of judgements ==
Court	Bench	Decision	Date
EWHC (Fam) (England) (Wales)	Mr Justice Francis	Change ventilator to palliative care	11 April
EWCA (Civ) (England) (Wales)	Lord Justice Mcfarlane	Parents' appeal dismissed	23 May
EWCA (Civ) (England) (Wales)	Lady Justice King	Parents' appeal dismissed	23 May
EWCA (Civ) (England) (Wales)	Lord Justice Sales	Parents' appeal dismissed	23 May
UKSC (United Kingdom)	The Baroness Hale of Richmond (DP)	Parents' appeal denied	8 June
UKSC (United Kingdom)	The Lord Kerr of Tonaghmore	Parents' appeal denied	8 June
UKSC (United Kingdom)	Lord Wilson of Culworth	Parents' appeal denied	8 June
ECHR (First Section) (Europe)	Linos-Alexandre Sicilianos (P)	Application inadmissible	3 July
ECHR (First Section) (Europe)	Kristina Pardalos	Application inadmissible	3 July
ECHR (First Section) (Europe)	Aleš Pejchal	Application inadmissible	3 July
ECHR (First Section) (Europe)	Krzysztof Wojtyczek	Application inadmissible	3 July
ECHR (First Section) (Europe)	Armen Harutyunyan	Application inadmissible	3 July
ECHR (First Section) (Europe)	Tim Eicke	Application inadmissible	3 July
ECHR (First Section) (Europe)	Jovan Ilievski	Application inadmissible	3 July

== See also ==
- Sudiksha Thirumalesh case – British woman who died after court case to decide on her medical treatment
