= Nicholas Francis =

Nicholas Francis may refer to:

- Nicholas Francis, Duke of Lorraine (1609–1670)
- Nicholas Francis (judge) (born 1958)
