= Doerflinger =

Doerflinger is a surname. Notable people with the surname include:

- Preston Doerflinger (born 1973), American businessman and politician
- Richard Doerflinger, American anti-abortion activist
- Thomas Doerflinger (1952–2015), American historian
- William Main Doerflinger (1910-2000), American folklorist and magician
