= Senator Francis (disambiguation) =

John Brown Francis (1791–1864) was a U.S. Senator from Rhode Island from 1844 to 1845, also serving in the Rhode Island State Senate. Senator Francis may also refer to:

- Charles Asa Francis (1855–1934), New Jersey State Senate
- Leslie E. Francis (1871–1957), Iowa State Senate
- Peter D. Francis (born 1934), Washington State Senate
