= Succinyl coenzyme A synthetase =

Class of enzymes

Succinate—CoA ligase (GDP-forming)
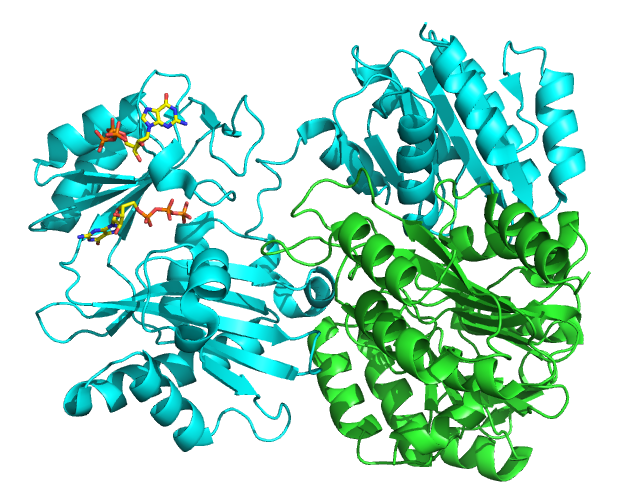
- Pig GTP-specific succinyl-CoA synthetase with GTP. PDB 2fp4

Identifiers
- EC no.: 6.2.1.4
- CAS no.: 9014-36-2

Databases
- BRENDA: enzyme data
- ExPASy: NiceZyme view
- KEGG: enzyme entry
- MetaCyc: metabolic pathway
- Rhea: reactions
- PDB structures: RCSB PDB PDBe PDBsum
- Gene Ontology: AmiGO / QuickGO
Search
- PMC: articles
- PubMed: articles
- NCBI: proteins

Succinate—CoA ligase (ADP-forming)
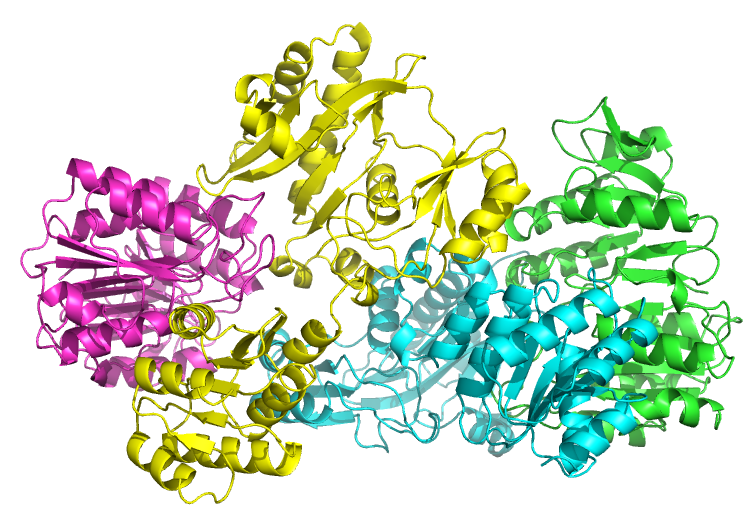
- Succinyl-COA synthetase from Escherichia coli. PDB 2scu

Identifiers
- EC no.: 6.2.1.5
- CAS no.: 9080-33-5

Databases
- BRENDA: enzyme data
- ExPASy: NiceZyme view
- KEGG: enzyme entry
- MetaCyc: metabolic pathway
- Rhea: reactions
- PDB structures: RCSB PDB PDBe PDBsum
- Gene Ontology: AmiGO / QuickGO
Search
- PMC: articles
- PubMed: articles
- NCBI: proteins

Succinyl coenzyme A synthetase (SCS, also known as succinyl-CoA synthetase or succinate thiokinase or succinate-CoA ligase) is an enzyme that catalyzes the reversible reaction of succinyl-CoA to succinate. The enzyme facilitates the coupling of this reaction to the formation of a nucleoside triphosphate molecule (either GTP or ATP) from an inorganic phosphate molecule and a nucleoside diphosphate molecule (either GDP or ADP). It plays a key role as one of the catalysts involved in the citric acid cycle, a central pathway in cellular metabolism, and it is located within the mitochondrial matrix of a cell.

== Chemical reaction and enzyme mechanism ==
Succinyl CoA synthetase catalyzes the following reversible reaction:

Succinyl CoA + Pi + NDP ↔ Succinate + CoA + NTP

where Pi denotes inorganic phosphate, NDP denotes nucleotide diphosphate (either GDP or ADP), and NTP denotes nucleotide triphosphate (either GTP or ATP). As mentioned, the enzyme facilitates coupling of the conversion of succinyl CoA to succinate with the formation of NTP from NDP and Pi. The reaction has a biochemical standard state free energy change of -3.4 kJ/mol. The reaction takes place by a three-step mechanism which is depicted in the image below. The first step involves displacement of CoA from succinyl CoA by a nucleophilic inorganic phosphate molecule to form succinyl phosphate. The enzyme then utilizes a histidine residue to remove the phosphate group from succinyl phosphate and generate succinate. Finally, the phosphorylated histidine transfers the phosphate group to a nucleoside diphosphate, which generates the high-energy carrying nucleoside triphosphate.

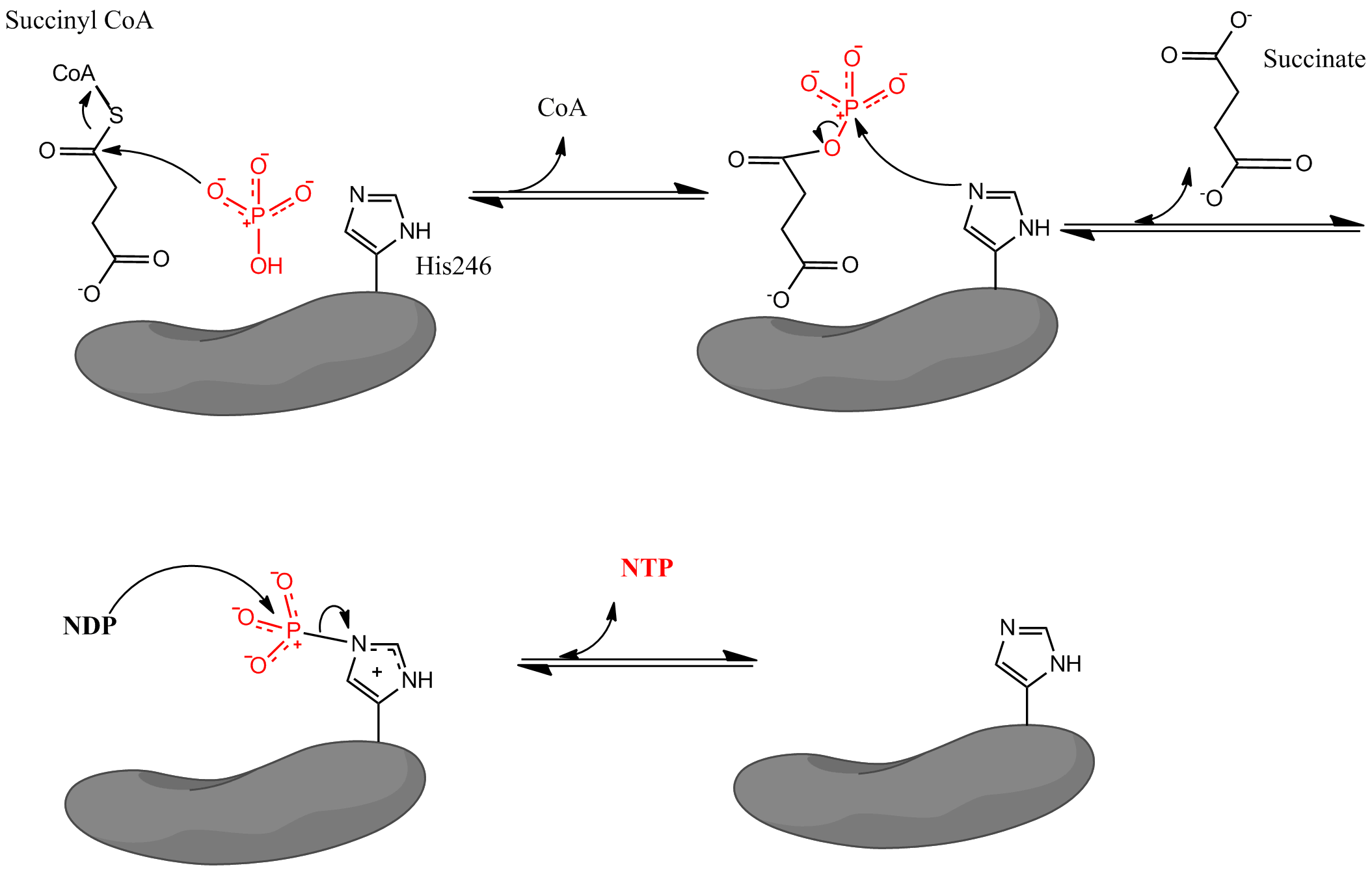

== Structure ==
=== Subunits ===
Bacterial and mammalian SCSs are made up of α and β subunits. In E. coli two αβ heterodimers link together to form an α_{2}β_{2} heterotetrameric structure. However, mammalian mitochondrial SCSs are active as αβ dimers and do not form a heterotetramer. The E. coli SCS heterotetramer has been crystallized and characterized in great detail. As can be seen in Image 2, the two α subunits (pink and green) reside on opposite sides of the structure and the two β subunits (yellow and blue) interact in the middle region of the protein. The two α subunits only interact with a single β unit, whereas the β units interact with a single α unit (to form the αβ dimer) and the β subunit of the other αβ dimer. A short amino acid chain links the two β subunits which gives rise to the tetrameric structure.

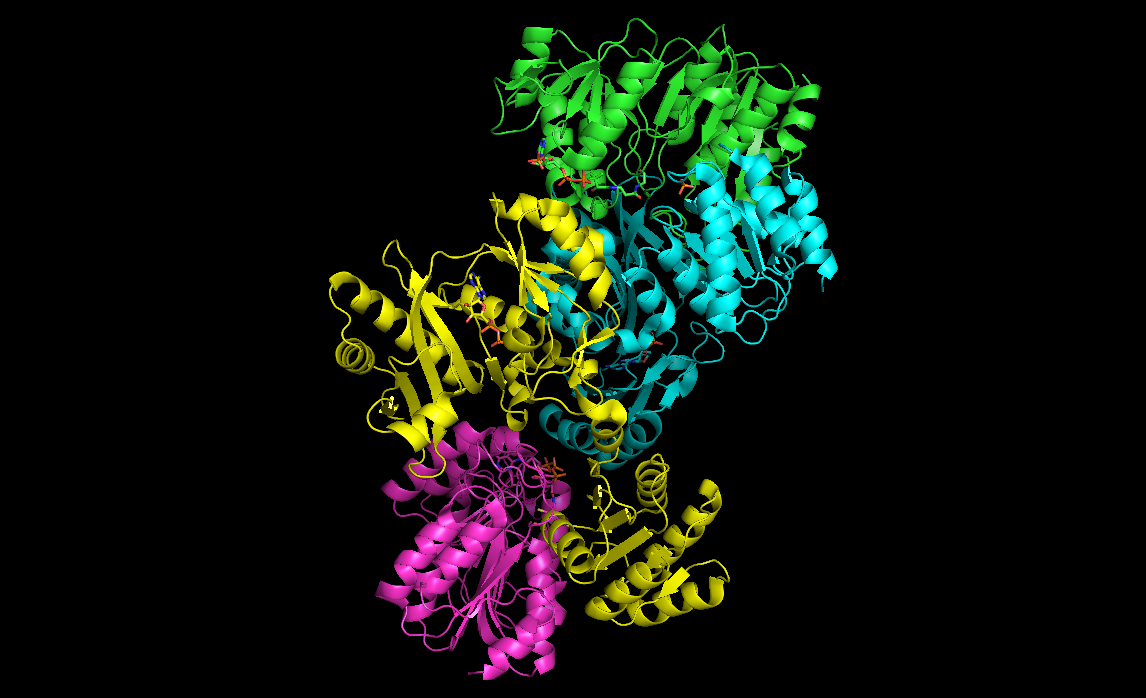
Image 2: The E. coli Succinyl-CoA Synthetase Heterotetramer; α subunits: pink and green, β subunits: yellow and blue. Pink and yellow form the one dimer and green and blue form the other dimer. PDB ID: 1CQG

The crystal structure of Succinyl-CoA synthetase alpha subunit (succinyl-CoA-binding isoform) was determined by Joyce et al. to a resolution of 2.10 A, with PDB code 1CQJ. .

=== Catalytic residues ===
Crystal structures for the E. coli SCS provide evidence that the coenzyme A binds within each α-subunit (within a Rossmann fold) in close proximity to a histidine residue (His246α). This histidine residue becomes phosphorylated during the succinate forming step in the reaction mechanism. The exact binding location of succinate is not well-defined. The formation of the nucleotide triphosphate occurs in an ATP grasp domain, which is located near the N-terminus of the each β subunit. However, this grasp domain is located about 35 Å away from the phosphorylated histidine residue. This leads researchers to believe that the enzyme must undergo a major change in conformation to bring the histidine to the grasp domain and facilitate the formation of the nucleoside triphosphate. Mutagenesis experiments have determined that two glutamate residues (one near the catalytic histidine, Glu208α and one near the ATP grasp domain, Glu197β) play a role in the phosphorylation and dephosphorylation of the histidine, but the exact mechanism by which the enzyme changes conformation is not fully understood.

=== Isoforms ===
Johnson et al. describe two isoforms of succinyl-CoA synthetase in amniotes, one that specifies synthesis of ATP, and one that synthesises GTP.

- EC 6.2.1.5 - ATP-forming - SUCLA2
- EC 6.2.1.4 - GTP-forming - SUCLG2

In amniotes, the enzyme is a heterodimer of an α- and a β-subunit. The specificity for either adenosine or guanosine phosphates is defined by the β-subunit, which is encoded by 2 genes. SUCLG2 is GTP-specific and SUCLA2 is ATP-specific, while SUCLG1 encodes the common α-subunit. β variants are produced at different amounts in different tissues, causing GTP or ATP substrate requirements.

Mostly consuming tissues such as heart and brain have more ATP-specific succinyl-CoA synthetase (ATPSCS), while synthetic tissues such as kidney and liver have the more GTP-specific form (GTPSCS). Kinetics analysis of ATPSCS from the breast muscle of pigeons and GTPSCS from pigeon liver showed that their apparent Michaelis constants were similar for CoA, but different for the nucleotides, phosphate, and succinate. The largest difference was for succinate: K_{m}app of ATPSCS = 5mM versus that of GTPSCS = 0.5mM.

== Function ==
=== Generation of nucleotide triphosphates ===
SCS is the only enzyme in the citric acid cycle that catalyzes a reaction in which a nucleotide triphosphate (GTP or ATP) is formed by substrate-level phosphorylation. Research studies have shown that E. coli SCSs can catalyze either GTP or ATP formation. However, mammals possess different types of SCSs that are specific for either GTP (G-SCS) or ATP (A-SCS) and are native to different types of tissue within the organism. An interesting study using pigeon cells showed that GTP specific SCSs were located in pigeon liver cells, and ATP specific SCSs were located in the pigeon breast muscle cells. Further research revealed a similar phenomenon of GTP and ATP specific SCSs in rat, mouse, and human tissue. It appears that tissue typically involved in anabolic metabolism (like the liver and kidneys) express G-SCS, whereas tissue involved in catabolic metabolism (like the brain, the heart, and muscular tissue) express A-SCS.

=== Formation of metabolic intermediates ===
SCS facilitates the flux of molecules into other metabolic pathways by controlling the interconversion between succinyl CoA and succinate. This is important because succinyl CoA is an intermediate necessary for porphyrin, heme, and ketone body biosynthesis.

== Regulation and inhibition ==
In some bacteria, the enzyme is regulated at the transcriptional level. It has been demonstrated that the gene for SCS (sucCD) is transcribed along with the gene for α-ketoglutarate dehydrogenase (sucAB) under the control of a promoter called sdhC, which is part of the succinate dehydrogenase operon. This operon is up-regulated by the presence of oxygen and responds to a variety of carbon sources. Antibacterial drugs that prevent phosphorylation of histidine, like the molecule LY26650, are potent inhibitors of bacterial SCSs.

== Optimal activity ==
Measurements (performed using a soy bean SCS) indicate an optimal temperature of 37 °C and an optimal pH of 7.0-8.0.

== Role in disease ==
Fatal infantile lactic acidosis: Defective SCS has been implicated as a cause of fatal infantile lactic acidosis, which is a disease in infants that is characterized by the build-up of toxic levels of lactic acid. The condition (when it is most severe) results in death usually within 2–4 days after birth. It has been determined that patients with the condition display a two base pair deletion within the gene known as SUCLG1 that encodes the α subunit of SCS. As a result, functional SCS is absent in metabolism causing a major imbalance in flux between glycolysis and the citric acid cycle. Since the cells do not have a functional citric acid cycle, acidosis results because cells are forced to choose lactic acid production as the primary means of producing ATP.

== See also ==
- Citric acid cycle
- Succinate dehydrogenase
- Succinate—CoA ligase (ADP-forming)
- Succinate—CoA ligase (GDP-forming)
