= DGUOK =

Protein-coding gene in the species Homo sapiens

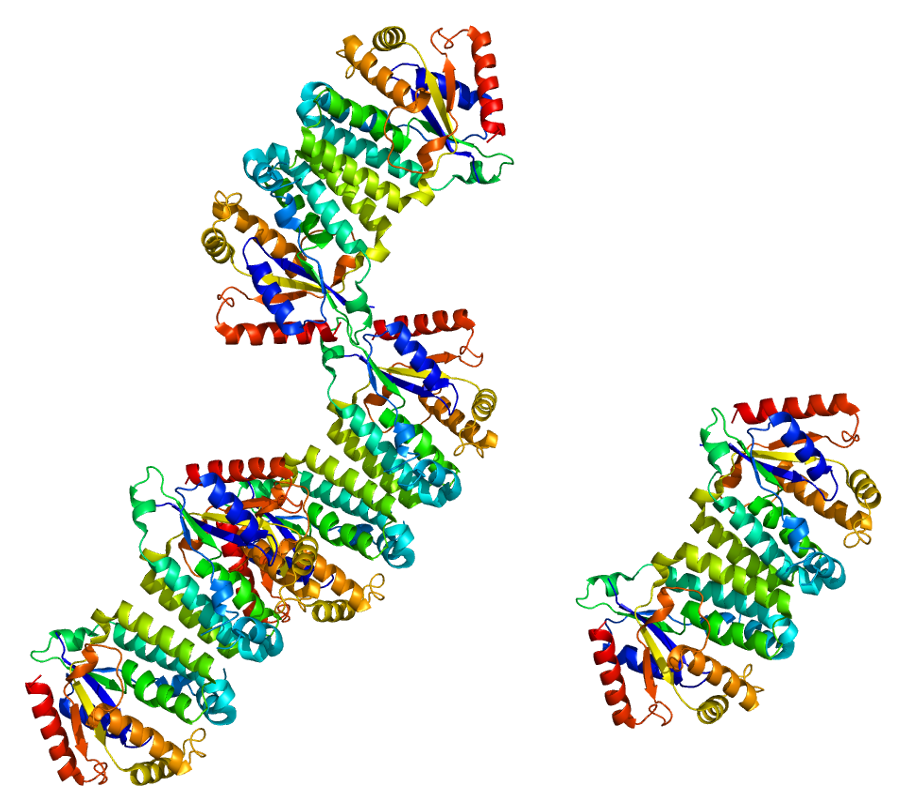

Identifiers
- Aliases: DGUOK, deoxyguanosine kinase, MTDPS3, dGK, NCPH, PEOB4, NCPH1
- External IDs: OMIM: 601465; MGI: 1351602; GeneCards: DGUOK
Available structures
PDB	Ortholog search: PDBe RCSB
PDB	List of PDB id codes 2OCP
Enzyme activity
EC #	BRENDA	ExPASy	KEGG	MetaCyc
2.7.1.76	↗	↗	↗	↗
2.7.1.113	↗	↗	↗	↗

Gene location (Human)
Chr.	Chromosome 2 (human)
Band	2p13.1	Start	73,926,826 bp
Band	2p13.1	End	73,958,961 bp

Gene location (Mouse)
Chr.	Chromosome 6 (mouse)
Band	6 C3|6 35.94 cM	Start	83,457,199 bp
Band	6 C3|6 35.94 cM	End	83,483,951 bp
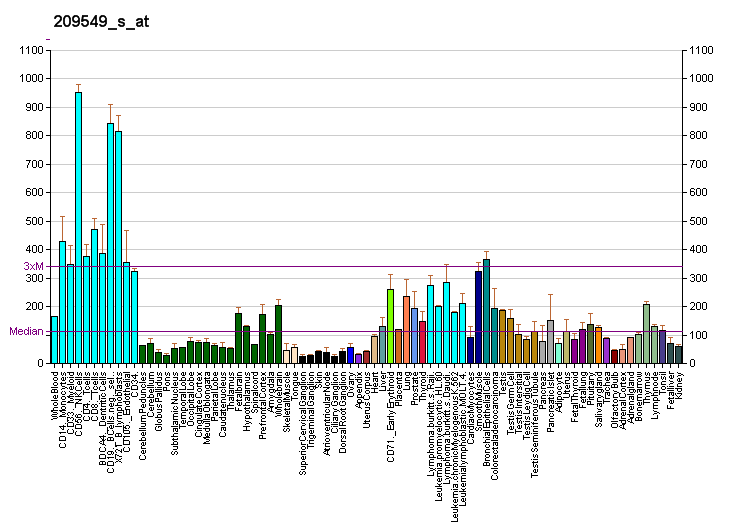

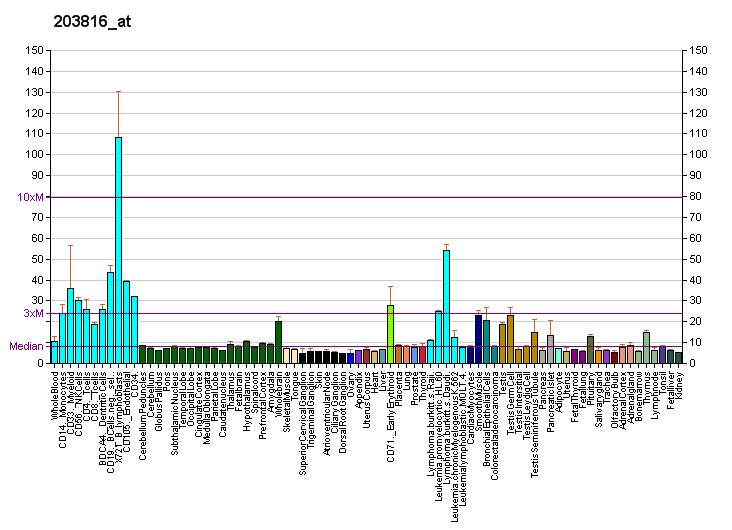
RNA expression pattern
Bgee	Human / Mouse (ortholog); Top expressed in: anterior pituitary; olfactory zone of nasal mucosa; ascending aorta; Descending thoracic aorta; ganglionic eminence; mucosa of transverse colon; popliteal artery; tibial arteries; left ovary; left coronary artery / Top expressed in: neural layer of retina; lactiferous gland; right kidney; endocardial cushion; right ventricle; secondary oocyte; saccule; ventricular zone; corneal stroma; adrenal gland; More reference expression data
BioGPS	More reference expression data
Gene ontology
Molecular function	transferase activity; nucleotide binding; nucleoside kinase activity; deoxyguanosine kinase activity; kinase activity; ATP binding; deoxynucleoside kinase activity
Cellular component	cytoplasm; cytosol; mitochondrial matrix; mitochondrion; nucleus
Biological process	negative regulation of neuron projection development; purine deoxyribonucleoside metabolic process; dGTP metabolic process; phosphorylation; purine-containing compound salvage; guanosine metabolic process; protein phosphorylation; nucleobase-containing compound metabolic process; nucleotide biosynthetic process; deoxyribonucleoside monophosphate biosynthetic process
Sources:Amigo / QuickGO
Orthologs
Databases	NCBI: entry; OMA: entry
Species	Human	Mouse
Entrez	1716	27369
Ensembl	ENSG00000114956	ENSMUSG00000014554
UniProt	Q16854	Q9QX60
RefSeq (mRNA)	NM_001929; NM_080915; NM_080916; NM_080917; NM_080918 NM_001318859; NM_001318860; NM_001318861; NM_001318862; NM_001318863	NM_001162521; NM_013764
RefSeq (protein)	NP_001305788; NP_001305789; NP_001305790; NP_001305791; NP_001305792 NP_550438; NP_550440	NP_001155993; NP_038792
Location (UCSC)	Chr 2: 73.93 – 73.96 Mb	Chr 6: 83.46 – 83.48 Mb
PubMed search
- Wikidata
View/Edit Human	View/Edit Mouse

Deoxyguanosine kinase, mitochondrial is an enzyme that in humans is encoded by the DGUOK gene.

== Function ==
In mammalian cells, the phosphorylation of purine deoxyribonucleosides is mediated predominantly by two deoxyribonucleoside kinases, cytosolic deoxycytidine kinase and mitochondrial deoxyguanosine kinase. The protein encoded by this gene is responsible for phosphorylation of purine deoxyribonucleosides in the mitochondrial matrix. In addition, this protein phosphorylates several purine deoxyribonucleoside analogs used in the treatment of lymphoproliferative disorders, and this phosphorylation is critical for the effectiveness of the analogs. Alternative splice variants encoding different protein isoforms have been described for this gene.

== Clinical ==
Mutations in this gene have been linked to inherited mitochondrial DNA depletion syndromes, neonatal liver failure, nystagmus and hypotonia.
