= MPV17 =

Protein-coding gene in the species Homo sapiens

Identifiers
- Aliases: MPV17, MTDPS6, SYM1, mitochondrial inner membrane protein, mitochondrial inner membrane protein CMT2EE
- External IDs: OMIM: 137960; MGI: 97138; HomoloGene: 39746; GeneCards: MPV17; OMA:MPV17 - orthologs

Gene location (Human)
Chr.	Chromosome 2 (human)
Band	2p23.3	Start	27,309,492 bp
Band	2p23.3	End	27,325,680 bp

Gene location (Mouse)
Chr.	Chromosome 5 (mouse)
Band	5|5 B1	Start	31,297,998 bp
Band	5|5 B1	End	31,311,595 bp
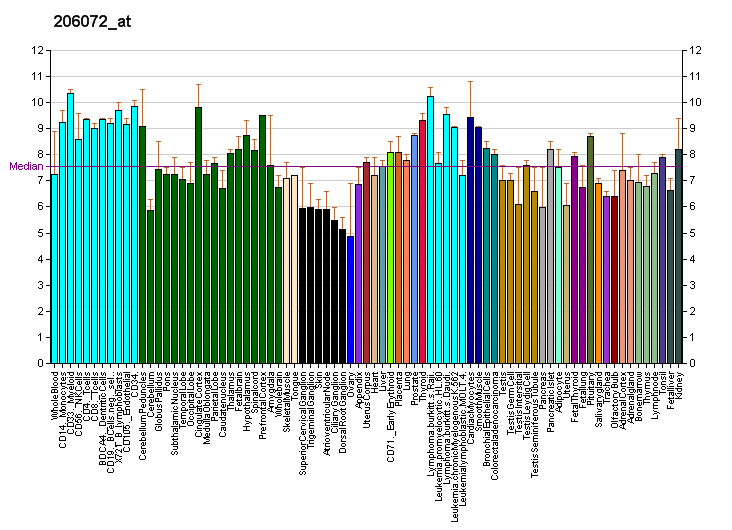
RNA expression pattern
Bgee	Human / Mouse (ortholog); Top expressed in: right adrenal gland; right adrenal cortex; left adrenal gland; left adrenal cortex; right hemisphere of cerebellum; right lobe of thyroid gland; anterior pituitary; left lobe of thyroid gland; right frontal lobe; islet of Langerhans / Top expressed in: right kidney; tail of embryo; yolk sac; genital tubercle; dentate gyrus of hippocampal formation granule cell; neural layer of retina; proximal tubule; epithelium of lens; muscle of thigh; right ventricle; More reference expression data
BioGPS	More reference expression data
Gene ontology
Molecular function	molecular function
Cellular component	integral component of membrane; mitochondrial inner membrane; peroxisome; membrane; mitochondrion; peroxisomal membrane; cytosol; cytoplasm
Biological process	inner ear development; regulation of reactive oxygen species metabolic process; mitochondrial genome maintenance; glomerular basement membrane development; homeostatic process; cellular response to reactive oxygen species; protein targeting to peroxisome
Sources:Amigo / QuickGO
Orthologs
Species	Human	Mouse
Entrez	4358	17527
Ensembl	ENSG00000115204	ENSMUSG00000107283
UniProt	P39210	P19258
RefSeq (mRNA)	NM_002437	NM_001294322; NM_001294324; NM_008622; NM_001310527; NM_001310528
RefSeq (protein)	NP_002428	NP_001281251; NP_001281253; NP_001297456; NP_001297457; NP_032648
Location (UCSC)	Chr 2: 27.31 – 27.33 Mb	Chr 5: 31.3 – 31.31 Mb
PubMed search
- Wikidata
View/Edit Human	View/Edit Mouse

Protein MPV17 is a protein that in humans is encoded by the MPV17 gene. It is a mitochondrial inner membrane protein, which has a so far largely unknown role in mtDNA maintenance. Protein MPV17 is expressed in human pancreas, kidney, muscle, liver, lung, placenta, brain and heart. Human MPV17 is the orthologue of the mouse kidney disease gene, Mpv17. Loss of function has been shown to cause hepatocerebral mtDNA depletion syndromes (MDS) with oxidative phosphorylation failure and mtDNA depletion both in affected individuals and in Mpv17−/− mice.

== Function ==
This protein was first thought to be a peroxisomal protein, but in 2006, Spinazzola et al. demonstrated that it is a mitochondrial inner membrane protein that is implicated in the formation of reactive oxygen species (ROS).

Restoration of Mpv17 expression in Mpv17-/- mice restores mtDNA copy number, suggesting MPV17 is involved in mtDNA copy number, and in mtDNA maintenance.

MPV17 seems to be also involved in apoptosis in podocytes, and involved in ROS.

== Structure ==
=== Gene ===
The human MPV17 gene is located on chromosome 2 at p21-23, comprising eight exons encoding 176 amino acids.

=== Protein ===
MPV17 belongs to a family of integral membrane proteins consisting of four members (PXMP2, MPV17, MP-L, and FKSG24 (MPV17L2)) in mammals and two members (Sym1 and Yor292) in yeast. The amino acid sequence of MPV17 (176 amino acids) contains four cysteine residues and three putative phosphorylation sites implies that this protein may act as a redox- and ATP-sensitive channel.

== Clinical significance ==
Mutations in this gene have been associated with the hepatocerebral form of mitochondrial DNA depletion syndrome (MDS), a mutation in this protein leads to an mtDNA (mitochondrial DNA) copy number decrease. By 2013, MDS caused by MPV17 mutations had been reported in 32 patients with the clinical manifestations including early progressive liver failure, neurological abnormalities, hypoglycaemia and raised blood lactate. In addition, MPV17 mutations have also been associated with autosomal recessive adult-onset neuropathy and leukoencephalopathy with multiple mtDNA deletions in skeletal muscle. Thus, MPV17 mutations can lead to recessive MDS or recessive multiple mtDNA deletion disorders.

== Interactions ==
MPV17 has been shown to interact with Prkdc protein during Adriamycin-induced nephropathy in mice.

== See also ==
- Navajo neurohepatopathy
