= Sudiksha Thirumalesh case =

British woman who died after court case to decide on her medical treatment

Sudiksha Thirumalesh (2004 - 12 September 2023) was a British woman who died in September 2023 at the age of 19 after a court case regarding her competence to make decisions about her medical care.

Thirumalesh suffered from a mitochondrial disorder. At a point where she was severely ill, the hospital moved to transfer her to palliative care, against her wishes and those of her parents, who instead wished her to undergo experimental nucleoside therapy in Canada. This resulted in a court case, during which her name, and that of the NHS trust involved, were restricted by court order, and she was named only as "ST". She was found not to be competent to make her own medical decisions on 25 August 2023, with Mrs Justice Roberts ruling that Thirumalesh had a "complete inability to accept the medical reality of her position." Thirumalesh subsequently died of cardiac arrest and respiratory failure on 12 September 2023.

Until late September 2023, her name was unable to be reported in relation to this case, being protected by an order made by the Court of Protection, which was lifted after her death as the court judged that maintaining the order was not in the interest of the public good, following no objections from the NHS trust. Her family have stated that they consider themselves to have been "brutally silenced" by the reporting restrictions. This is disputed by the NHS trust lawyer, Victoria Butler-Cole KC, who claimed there may have been a misunderstanding of the scope of the restrictions. On 29 September 2023 the restriction on the naming of the NHS trust was lifted and it was revealed to be the University Hospitals Birmingham NHS Foundation Trust.

In July 2024, the Court of Appeal allowed an appeal against Court of Protection's 2023 decision. The three judges ruled that the decision was "wrong and contrary to Court of Appeal authority". Additionally, the Court of Appeal ruled that the previous judge "fell into error" and emphasized the principle of autonomy and the presumption of mental capacity.

== See also ==
- Charlie Gard case
