= SUCLA2 =

Protein-coding gene in the species Homo sapiens

Identifiers
- Aliases: SUCLA2, A-BETA, MTDPS5, SCS-betaA, succinate-CoA ligase ADP-forming beta subunit, A-SCS, succinate-CoA ligase ADP-forming subunit beta, LINC00444
- External IDs: OMIM: 603921; MGI: 1306775; GeneCards: SUCLA2
Enzyme activity
EC #	BRENDA	ExPASy	KEGG	MetaCyc
6.2.1.5	↗	↗	↗	↗
6.2.1.9	↗	↗	↗	↗

Gene location (Human)
Chr.	Chromosome 13 (human)
Band	13q14.2	Start	47,745,736 bp
Band	13q14.2	End	48,037,968 bp

Gene location (Mouse)
Chr.	Chromosome 14 (mouse)
Band	14|14 D3	Start	73,762,759 bp
Band	14|14 D3	End	73,833,582 bp
RNA expression pattern
Bgee	Human / Mouse (ortholog); Top expressed in: jejunal mucosa; pons; lateral nuclear group of thalamus; body of tongue; vastus lateralis muscle; biceps brachii; right ventricle; Skeletal muscle tissue of rectus abdominis; thoracic diaphragm; myocardium of left ventricle / Top expressed in: atrioventricular valve; intercostal muscle; seminiferous tubule; spermatid; facial motor nucleus; cardiac muscle tissue of left ventricle; vastus lateralis muscle; masseter muscle; triceps brachii muscle; extraocular muscle; More reference expression data
BioGPS	n/a
Gene ontology
Molecular function	nucleotide binding; ligase activity; protein binding; catalytic activity; ATP binding; metal ion binding; succinate-CoA ligase (ADP-forming) activity; magnesium ion binding
Cellular component	myelin sheath; mitochondrial matrix; extracellular exosome; mitochondrion; succinate-CoA ligase complex
Biological process	succinate metabolic process; metabolism; tricarboxylic acid cycle; succinyl-CoA pathway; succinyl-CoA metabolic process
Sources:Amigo / QuickGO
Orthologs
Databases	NCBI: entry; OMA: entry
Species	Human	Mouse
Entrez	8803	20916
Ensembl	ENSG00000136143	ENSMUSG00000022110
UniProt	Q9P2R7; Q5T9Q8	Q9Z2I9
RefSeq (mRNA)	NM_003850	NM_011506; NM_001361638
RefSeq (protein)	NP_003841	NP_035636; NP_001348567
Location (UCSC)	Chr 13: 47.75 – 48.04 Mb	Chr 14: 73.76 – 73.83 Mb
PubMed search
- Wikidata
View/Edit Human	View/Edit Mouse

Succinyl-CoA ligase [ADP-forming] subunit beta, mitochondrial (SUCLA2), also known as ADP-forming succinyl-CoA synthetase (SCS-A), is an enzyme that in humans is encoded by the SUCLA2 gene on chromosome 13.

Succinyl-CoA synthetase (SCS) is a mitochondrial matrix enzyme that acts as a heterodimer, composed of an invariant alpha subunit and a substrate-specific beta subunit. The protein encoded by this gene is an ATP-specific SCS beta subunit that dimerizes with the SCS alpha subunit to form SCS-A, an essential component of the tricarboxylic acid cycle. SCS-A hydrolyzes ATP to convert succinyl-CoA to succinate. Defects in this gene are a cause of myopathic mitochondrial DNA depletion syndrome. A pseudogene of this gene has been found on chromosome 6. [provided by RefSeq, Jul 2008]

== Structure ==
SCS, also known as succinyl CoA ligase (SUCL), is a heterodimer composed of a catalytic α subunit encoded by the SUCLG1 gene and a β subunit encoded by either the SUCLA2 gene or the SUCLG2 gene, which determines the enzyme specificity for either ADP or GDP. SUCLA2 is the SCS variant containing the SUCLA2-encoded β subunit. Amino acid sequence alignment of the two β subunit types reveals a homology of ~50% identity, with specific regions conserved throughout the sequences.

SUCLA2 is located on chromosome 13 and contains 13 exons.

== Function ==
As a subunit of SCS, SUCLA2 is a mitochondrial matrix enzyme that catalyzes the reversible conversion of succinyl-CoA to succinate and Acetoacetyl CoA, accompanied by the substrate-level phosphorylation of ADP to ATP, as a step in the tricarboxylic acid (TCA) cycle. The ATP generated is then consumed in catabolic pathways. Since substrate-level phosphorylation does not require oxygen for ATP production, this reaction can rescue cells from cytosolic ATP depletion during ischemia. The reverse reaction generates succinyl-CoA from succinate to fuel ketone body and heme synthesis.

While SCS is ubiquitously expressed, SUCLA2 is predominantly expressed in catabolic tissues reliant on ATP as their main energy source, including the heart, brain, and skeletal muscle. Within the brain, SUCLA2 is found exclusively in neurons; meanwhile, both SUCLA2 and SUCLG2 are absent in astrocytes, microglia, and oligodendrocytes. In order to acquire succinate to continue the TCA cycle, these cells may instead synthesize succinate through GABAmetabolism of α-ketoglutarate or ketone body metabolism of succinyl-CoA.

== Clinical significance ==
Mutations in the SUCLA2 gene are associated with mitochondrial DNA (mtDNA) depletion syndrome. Symptoms include early-onset low muscle tone, severe muscular atrophy, scoliosis, movement disorders such as dystonia and hyperkinesia, epilepsy, and growth retardation. Because succinic acid cannot be made from succinyl coa, treatment is with oral succinic acid, which allows the Krebs cycle and electron transport chain to function correctly. Other treatments for managing symptoms include exercises to promote mobility and respiratory assistance, baclofen to treat dystonia and hyperkinesia, and antiepileptic drugs for seizures.

There is a relatively high incidence of a specific SUCLA2 mutation in the Faroe Islands due to a founder effect. This particular mutation is often associated with early lethality. Two additional founder mutations have been discovered in the Scandinavian population, in addition to the known SUCLA2 founder mutation in the Faroe Islands. These patients show a higher variability in outcomes with several patients with SUCLA2 missense mutation surviving into adulthood. This variability suggests that SUCLA2 missense mutations may be associated with residual enzyme activity.

Coenzyme Q10 and antioxidants have been used to treat mitochondrial DNA depletion syndrome, but there is currently no evidence that these treatments result in clinical benefit.

Mutations in the SUCLA2 gene leading to SUCLA2 deficiency result in Leigh's or a Leigh-like syndrome with the onset of severe hypotonia, muscular atrophy, sensorineural hearing impairment, and often death in early childhood.

== See also ==
- Succinyl-CoA synthetase
- SUCLG1
- SUCLG2
