= RRM2B =

Protein-coding gene in humans

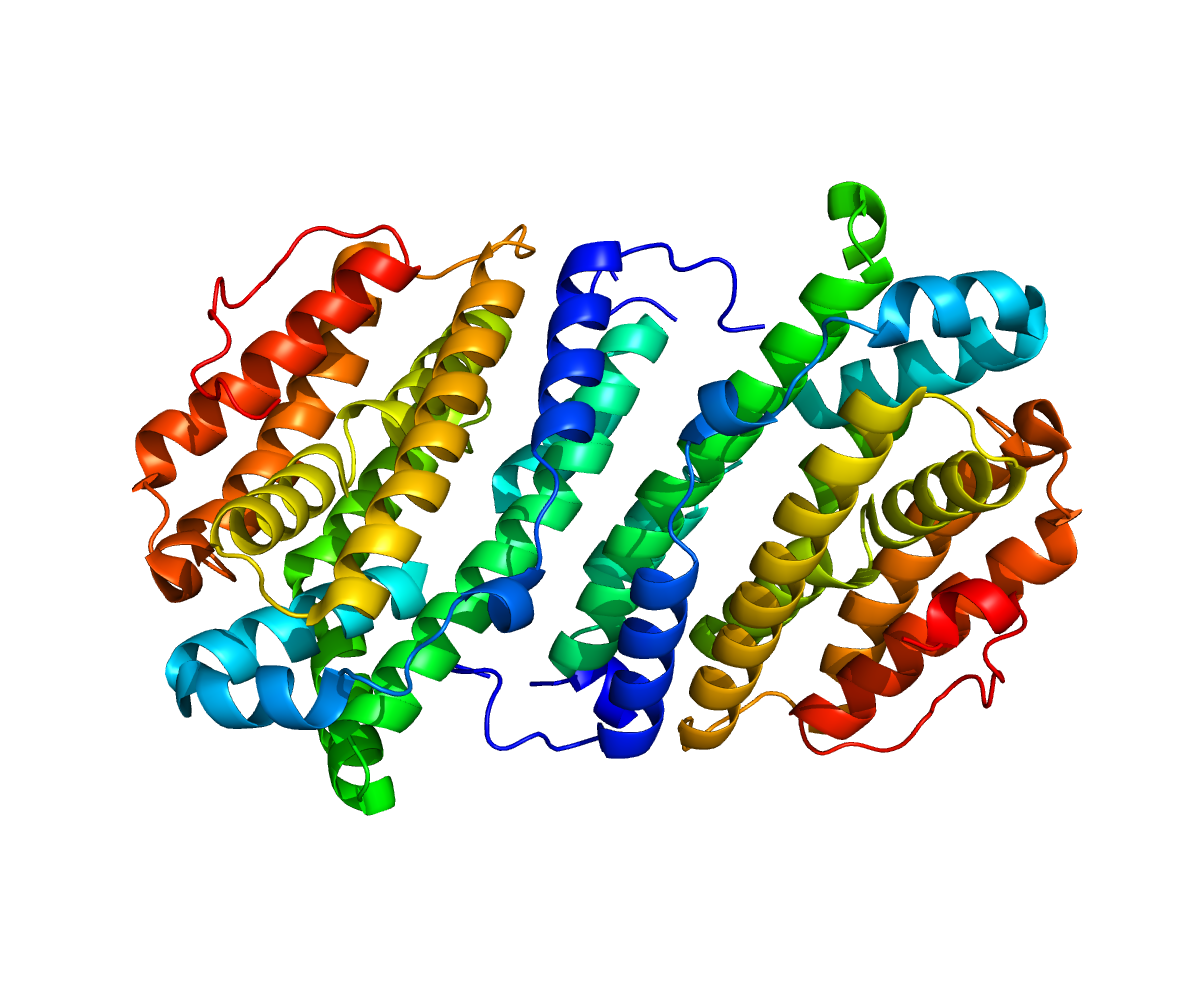

Identifiers
- Aliases: RRM2B, MTDPS8A, MTDPS8B, P53R2, ribonucleotide reductase regulatory TP53 inducible subunit M2B, RCDFRD
- External IDs: OMIM: 604712; MGI: 2155865; GeneCards: RRM2B
Available structures
PDB	Ortholog search: PDBe RCSB
PDB	List of PDB id codes 2VUX, 3HF1, 4DJN
Enzyme activity
EC #	BRENDA	ExPASy	KEGG	MetaCyc
1.17.4.1	↗	↗	↗	↗

Gene location (Human)
Chr.	Chromosome 8 (human)
Band	8q22.3	Start	102,204,502 bp
Band	8q22.3	End	102,238,961 bp

Gene location (Mouse)
Chr.	Chromosome 15 (mouse)
Band	15|15 B3.1	Start	37,924,196 bp
Band	15|15 B3.1	End	37,961,562 bp
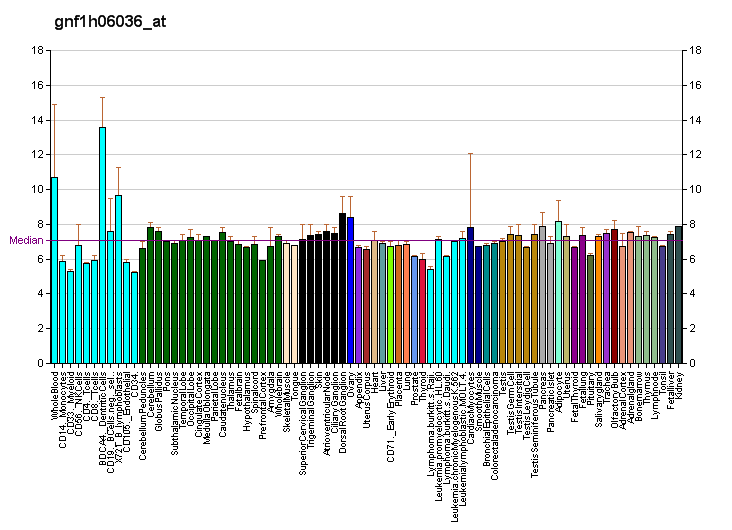
RNA expression pattern
Bgee	Human / Mouse (ortholog); Top expressed in: secondary oocyte; deltoid muscle; islet of Langerhans; quadriceps femoris muscle; vastus lateralis muscle; germinal epithelium; tibialis anterior muscle; Skeletal muscle tissue of rectus abdominis; palpebral conjunctiva; pars reticulata / Top expressed in: zygote; secondary oocyte; primary oocyte; cardiac muscle tissue of left ventricle; Rostral migratory stream; sciatic nerve; cingulate gyrus; substantia nigra; habenula; iris; More reference expression data
BioGPS	More reference expression data
Gene ontology
Molecular function	metal ion binding; protein binding; oxidoreductase activity; ribonucleoside-diphosphate reductase activity, thioredoxin disulfide as acceptor
Cellular component	mitochondrion; nucleus; nucleoplasm; cytoplasm; cytosol; ribonucleoside-diphosphate reductase complex
Biological process	deoxyribonucleoside triphosphate metabolic process; renal system process; kidney development; response to oxidative stress; mitochondrial DNA replication; cellular response to DNA damage stimulus; deoxyribonucleotide biosynthetic process; DNA replication; negative regulation of intrinsic apoptotic signaling pathway by p53 class mediator; response to amine; DNA repair; nucleobase-containing small molecule interconversion
Sources:Amigo / QuickGO
Orthologs
Databases	NCBI: entry; OMA: entry
Species	Human	Mouse
Entrez	50484	382985
Ensembl	ENSG00000048392	ENSMUSG00000022292
UniProt	Q7LG56	Q6PEE3
RefSeq (mRNA)	NM_015713; NM_001172477; NM_001172478	NM_199476; NM_001357022; NM_001357023
RefSeq (protein)	NP_001165948; NP_001165949; NP_056528	NP_955770; NP_001343951; NP_001343952
Location (UCSC)	Chr 8: 102.2 – 102.24 Mb	Chr 15: 37.92 – 37.96 Mb
PubMed search
- Wikidata
View/Edit Human	View/Edit Mouse

Ribonucleotide-diphosphate reductase subunit M2 B is an enzyme that in humans is encoded by the RRM2B gene. The gene encoding the RRM2B protein is located on chromosome 8, at position 8q23.1. The gene and its products are also known by designations MTDPS8A, MTDPS8B, and p53R2.

== Function ==
RRM2B codes for one of two versions of the R2 subunit of ribonucleotide reductase, which generates nucleotide precursors required for DNA replication by reducing ribonucleoside diphosphates to deoxyribonucloside diphosphates. The version of R2 encoded by RRM2B is induced by p53, and is required for normal DNA repair and mtDNA synthesis in non-proliferating cells. The other form of R2 is expressed only in dividing cells.

== Interactions ==
RRM2B has been shown to interact with Mdm2 and Ataxia telangiectasia mutated.

== Clinical relevance ==
Abnormalities in this gene are one of the causes of mitochondrial DNA depletion syndrome (MDDS). Neonatal hypotonia, developmental delay, encephalopathy, with seizures, deafness and lactic acidosis have been associated with mutations in this gene. MDDS is fatal, with death occurring from respiratory failure in early childhood.

It has been associated with some cases of pediatric acute liver failure.

Mutations in this gene have been shown to cause progressive external ophthalmoplegia.

Increased expression of RRM2B has been correlated with gemcitabine resistance in human cholangiocarcinoma cells and may be predictive of lack of clinical benefit from gemcitabine for human cancers.
