= Deoxyguanosine kinase =

Identifiers
- EC no.: 2.7.1.113
- CAS no.: 39471-28-8

Databases
- IntEnz: IntEnz view
- BRENDA: BRENDA entry
- ExPASy: NiceZyme view
- KEGG: KEGG entry
- MetaCyc: metabolic pathway
- PRIAM: profile
- PDB structures: RCSB PDB PDBe PDBsum
- Gene Ontology: AmiGO / QuickGO
Search
- PMC: articles
- PubMed: articles
- NCBI: proteins

Deoxyguanosine kinase (EC 2.7.1.113) is an enzyme that catalyzes a chemical reaction that transfers a phosphate group from the cofactor, adenosine triphosphate (ATP), to deoxyguanosine. This gives adenosine diphosphate (ADP) and deoxyguanosine monophosphate:

ATP +
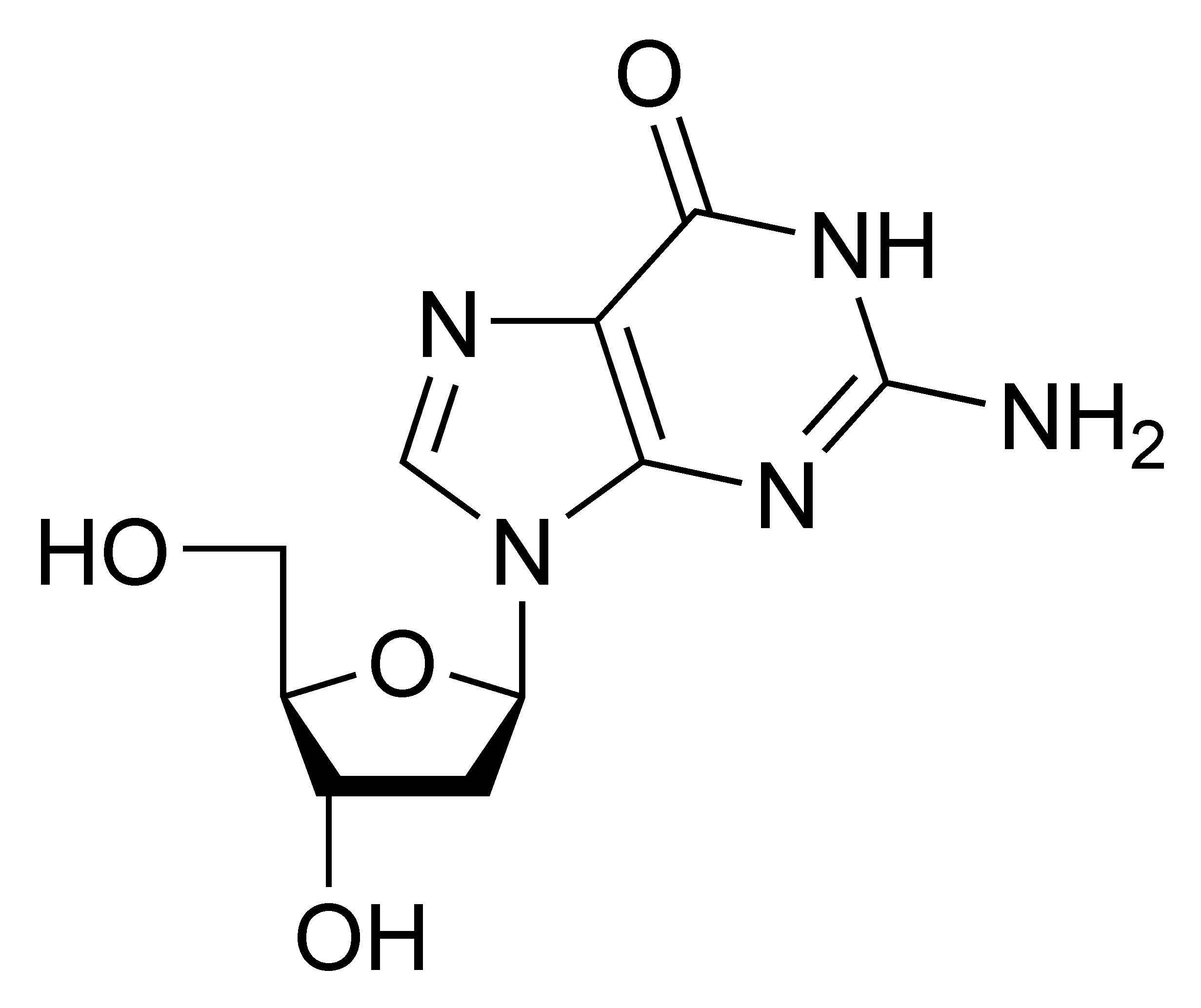
deoxyguanosine
ADP +
deoxyguanosine monophosphate

The enzyme has ben found in calf thymus and mouse.

This enzyme is a transferase, specifically one transferring phosphorus-containing groups (phosphotransferases) with an alcohol group as acceptor. The systematic name of this enzyme class is ATP:deoxyguanosine 5'-phosphotransferase. Other names in common use include deoxyguanosine kinase (phosphorylating), (dihydroxypropoxymethyl)guanine kinase, 2'-deoxyguanosine kinase, and NTP-deoxyguanosine 5'-phosphotransferase.

== Structural studies ==
As of late 2007, 4 structures have been solved for this class of enzymes, with PDB accession codes PDB: 2JAQ, PDB: 2JAS, PDB: 2JAT, and PDB: 2OCP.

== Clinical ==
Mutations in this gene have been linked to inherited mitochondrial DNA depletion syndromes, neonatal liver failure, nystagmus and hypotonia.
