= Peter Francis (rugby union) =

- Full name: Peter William Francis
- Born: 9 July 1957 (age 69) Cowbridge, Wales

Rugby union career
- Position: Prop
International career
Years	Team	Apps	(Points)
1987	Wales	1	(0)

Peter William Francis (born 9 July 1957) is a Welsh former rugby union international.

A Cowbridge-born prop, Francis was capped once for Wales, against Scotland at Murrayfield during the 1987 Five Nations Championship. He got his opportunity when Stuart Evans was a late injury withdrawal.

Francis played over 300 games for Maesteg and was club captain for three seasons. Due his farm work in Kidwelly, he switched to nearer club Llanelli in 1987 and later played with Kidwelly RFC in the lower divisions.

== See also ==
- List of Wales national rugby union players
