= FBXL4 =

Protein-coding gene in the species Homo sapiens

Identifiers
- Aliases: FBXL4, FBL4, FBL5, MTDPS13, F-box and leucine-rich repeat protein 4, F-box and leucine rich repeat protein 4
- External IDs: OMIM: 605654; MGI: 2140367; GeneCards: FBXL4

Gene location (Human)
Chr.	Chromosome 6 (human)
Band	6q16.1-q16.2	Start	98,868,535 bp
Band	6q16.1-q16.2	End	98,948,006 bp

Gene location (Mouse)
Chr.	Chromosome 4 (mouse)
Band	4|4 A3	Start	22,357,543 bp
Band	4|4 A3	End	22,434,091 bp
RNA expression pattern
Bgee	Human / Mouse (ortholog); Top expressed in: corpus epididymis; Achilles tendon; islet of Langerhans; caput epididymis; tail of epididymis; Epithelium of choroid plexus; stromal cell of endometrium; gastrocnemius muscle; right adrenal cortex; muscle of thigh / Top expressed in: superior cervical ganglion; parotid gland; submandibular gland; triceps brachii muscle; white adipose tissue; vastus lateralis muscle; muscle of thigh; otolith organ; utricle; interventricular septum; More reference expression data
BioGPS	n/a
Gene ontology
Molecular function	ubiquitin-protein transferase activity
Cellular component	cytoplasm; mitochondrial intermembrane space; mitochondrion; nucleus; ubiquitin ligase complex; cytosol; nuclear speck; SCF ubiquitin ligase complex
Biological process	ubiquitin-dependent protein catabolic process; protein polyubiquitination; post-translational protein modification; SCF-dependent proteasomal ubiquitin-dependent protein catabolic process
Sources:Amigo / QuickGO
Orthologs
Databases	NCBI: entry; OMA: entry
Species	Human	Mouse
Entrez	26235	269514
Ensembl	ENSG00000112234	ENSMUSG00000040410
UniProt	Q9UKA2	Q8BH70
RefSeq (mRNA)	NM_001278716; NM_012160	NM_172988
RefSeq (protein)	NP_001265645; NP_036292	NP_766576
Location (UCSC)	Chr 6: 98.87 – 98.95 Mb	Chr 4: 22.36 – 22.43 Mb
PubMed search
- Wikidata
View/Edit Human	View/Edit Mouse

F-box and leucine-rich repeat protein 4 is a protein that in humans is encoded by the FBXL4 gene.

== Structure ==
This gene encodes a member of the F-box protein family which is characterized by an approximately 40 amino acid motif, the F-box. The F-box proteins constitute one of the four subunits of ubiquitin protein ligase complex called SCFs (SKP1-cullin-F-box), which function in phosphorylation-dependent ubiquitination. The F-box proteins are divided into 3 classes: Fbws containing WD-40 domains, Fbls containing leucine-rich repeats, and Fbxs containing either different protein-protein interaction modules or no recognizable motifs. The protein encoded by this gene belongs to the Fbls class and, in addition to an F-box, contains at least 9 tandem leucine-rich repeats.

== Clinical significance ==
Mutations in this gene cause early-onset mitochondrial encephalomyopathy.
