= Peter D. Francis =

American politician

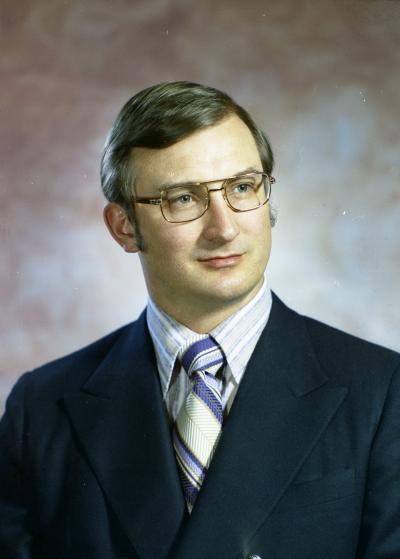
- Francis in 1971

Member of the Washington House of Representatives for the 32nd district
- In office 1969

Member of the Washington State Senate for the 32nd district
- In office December 1, 1969 – December 31, 1977

Personal details
- Born: 1934 (age 91–92) Seattle, Washington, United States
- Party: Democratic
- Occupation: attorney

Peter D. Francis (born 1934) is an American former politician in the state of Washington. He served in the Washington House of Representatives and Washington State Senate as a Democrat from the 32nd District. He was a member of the first Washington Redistricting Commission in 1983.
