= Richard Doerflinger =

American activist

Richard Doerflinger was associate director of Pro-Life Activities at the United States Conference of Catholic Bishops. He has been described as the USCCB's "point man on abortion" and "a major player in the health care debate,"

Mother Jones has called him "The Man Who Almost Killed Health Care Reform" for his co-authorship of the controversial Stupak Amendment. In 2008, the Gerald Health Foundation called him (one of the) "greatest heroes in the pro-life movement."
