= Nicholas Francis (judge) =

British judge

Sir Nicholas Francis
- Royal coat of arms of the United Kingdom

Justice of the High Court
- In office 3 October 2016 – 1 May 2024
- Monarch: Charles III

Personal details
- Born: Peter Nicholas Francis; 22 April 1958 (age 68) Glamorgan, Wales
- Education: Downing College, Cambridge

Sir Peter Nicholas Francis is a British retired High Court judge.

== Early life ==
Francis was educated at Radley College and Downing College, Cambridge.

== Career ==
Francis was called to the Bar by Middle Temple in 1981, and became a King's Counsel in 2002. He specialised in family law, and became head of chambers at 29 Bedford Row in 2002.

He was appointed as an Assistant Recorder in 1999 and later a Recorder to sit on the South Eastern Circuit in July, 2000.

He would be appointed as a Deputy High Court judge in 2011. He would later be appointed as a High Court judge in 2016 and assigned to the Family Division by the Lord Chief Justice. He received the customary knighthood from Queen Elizabeth II on16th of December 2016.

On 22 April 2024, the Lady Chief Justice issued Francis with formal advice for misconduct related to having delayed the issuing of a judgement by 18 months after the hearing had taken place. Francis accepted the finding of the nominated judge and expressed his regret at the delay. His explanation that at the time he was facing challenging personal circumstances and a busy workload was taken into consideration as mitigating circumstances.

Francis retired 1 May 2024.

== Notable cases ==
In 2017, he ruled on the controversial best interests case of Charlie Gard.
