= SUCLG1 =

Protein-coding gene in the species Homo sapiens

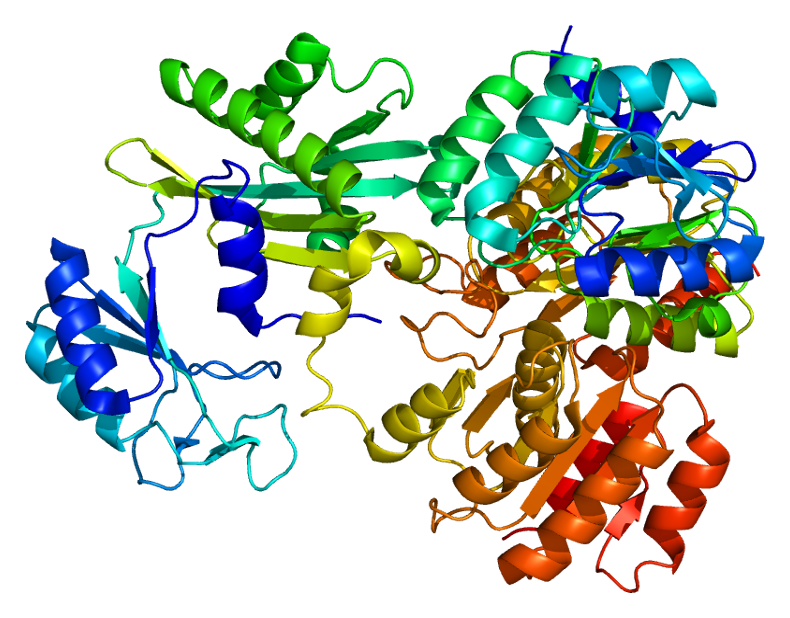

Identifiers
- Aliases: SUCLG1, GALPHA, MTDPS9, SUCLA1, succinate-CoA ligase alpha subunit, succinate-CoA ligase GDP/ADP-forming subunit alpha
- External IDs: OMIM: 611224; MGI: 1927234; HomoloGene: 55785; GeneCards: SUCLG1; OMA:SUCLG1 - orthologs

Gene location (Human)
| Chr. | Chromosome 2 (human) |
| Band | 2p11.2 | Start | 84,423,528 bp |
| Band | 2p11.2 | End | 84,460,045 bp |

Gene location (Mouse)
| Chr. | Chromosome 6 (mouse) |
| Band | 6|6 C1 | Start | 73,225,365 bp |
| Band | 6|6 C1 | End | 73,253,894 bp |
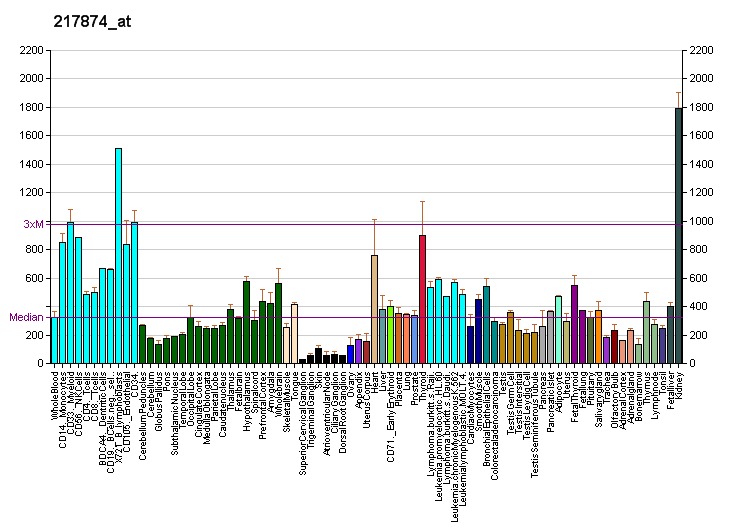

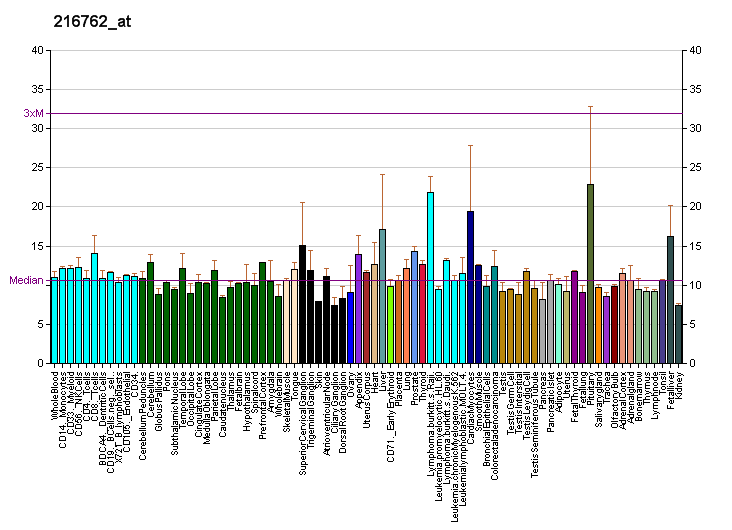
RNA expression pattern
| Bgee | Human / Mouse (ortholog); Top expressed in: kidney tubule; glomerulus; metanephric glomerulus; renal medulla; jejunal mucosa; duodenum; mucosa of transverse colon; right ventricle; mucosa of sigmoid colon; apex of heart / Top expressed in: interventricular septum; digastric muscle; myocardium of ventricle; brown adipose tissue; plantaris muscle; right kidney; extensor digitorum longus muscle; sternocleidomastoid muscle; extraocular muscle; vastus lateralis muscle; More reference expression data |
| BioGPS | More reference expression data |
Gene ontology
| Molecular function | nucleotide binding; ligase activity; catalytic activity; RNA binding; succinate-CoA ligase (ADP-forming) activity; succinate-CoA ligase (GDP-forming) activity; nucleoside diphosphate kinase activity; GDP binding; succinate-CoA ligase activity |
| Cellular component | plasma membrane; mitochondrion; mitochondrial inner membrane; extracellular exosome; cytosol; mitochondrial matrix; succinate-CoA ligase complex (GDP-forming) |
| Biological process | metabolism; tricarboxylic acid cycle; succinyl-CoA metabolic process; succinate metabolic process; nucleoside diphosphate phosphorylation; nucleoside triphosphate biosynthetic process |
Sources:Amigo / QuickGO
Orthologs
| Species | Human | Mouse |
| Entrez | 8802 | 56451 |
| Ensembl | ENSG00000163541 | ENSMUSG00000052738 |
| UniProt | P53597 | Q9WUM5 |
| RefSeq (mRNA) | NM_003849 | NM_019879 |
| RefSeq (protein) | NP_003840 | NP_063932 |
| Location (UCSC) | Chr 2: 84.42 – 84.46 Mb | Chr 6: 73.23 – 73.25 Mb |
| PubMed search |
- Wikidata
| View/Edit Human | View/Edit Mouse |

Succinyl-CoA ligase [GDP-forming] subunit alpha, mitochondrial is an enzyme that in humans is encoded by the SUCLG1 gene.

== Structure ==
The enzyme encoded by SUCLG1 can exist in either a phosphorylated form or a dephosphorylated form. In the dephosphorylated structure, a phosphate ion works in coordination with a histidine residue in the active site and the two alpha helices, one contributed by each subunit of the alphabeta-dimer to stabilize the structure. One of the alpha helices contains amino acids, the modification of which result in conformational changes that accommodate either the bound phosphoryl group or the free phosphate ion.

== Function ==
This gene encodes the alpha subunit of the heterodimeric enzyme succinate coenzyme A ligase. This enzyme is targeted to the mitochondria and catalyzes the conversion of succinyl CoA and ADP or GDP to succinate and ATP or GTP. Mutations in this gene are the cause of the metabolic disorder fatal infantile lactic acidosis and mitochondrial DNA depletion.

== Clinical significance ==
Succinate-CoA ligase deficiency is responsible for encephalomyopathy with mitochondrial DNA depletion and mild methylmalonic aciduria. Mutations in SUCLG1 lead to complete absence of SUCLG1 protein and are responsible for a very severe disorder with antenatal manifestations. Furthermore, it is shown that in the absence of SUCLG1 protein, no SUCLA2 protein is found in fibroblasts by western blot analysis. This result is consistent with a degradation of SUCLA2 when its heterodimer partner, SUCLG1, is absent. As mitochondrial DNA depletion in muscle is not a constant finding in SUCLG1 patients, diagnosis should not be based on it; additionally, it may be that alternative physiopathological mechanisms may be considered to explain the combined respiratory chain deficiency observed in these patients.

== Interactive pathway map ==
Click on genes, proteins and metabolites below to link to respective articles. (Note: The interactive pathway map can be edited at WikiPathways: "TCACycle_WP78".)

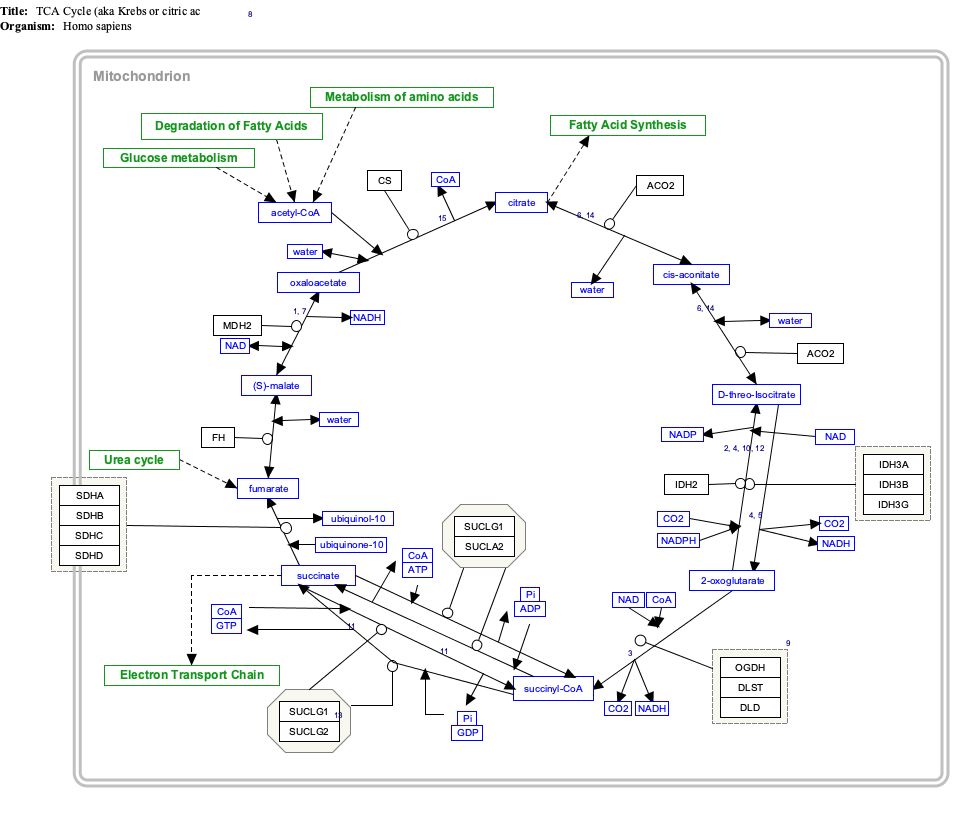

TCACycle_WP78 edit
