= Kindling hypothesis =

Kindling hypothesis is the argument that some neurological and psychiatric conditions worsen due to repeated episodes of symptoms that cause neurological changes. These theories posit that if episodes continue without treatment, the threshold to trigger an epileptic seizure or mood episode in bipolar disorder will be lowered.

- Kindling hypothesis of bipolar disorder, see biology of bipolar disorder
- Kindling hypothesis of depression
- Kindling model of epilepsy
- Kindling (sedative–hypnotic withdrawal), for GABAnergic drugs
