= Thymidine phosphorylase =

Enzyme

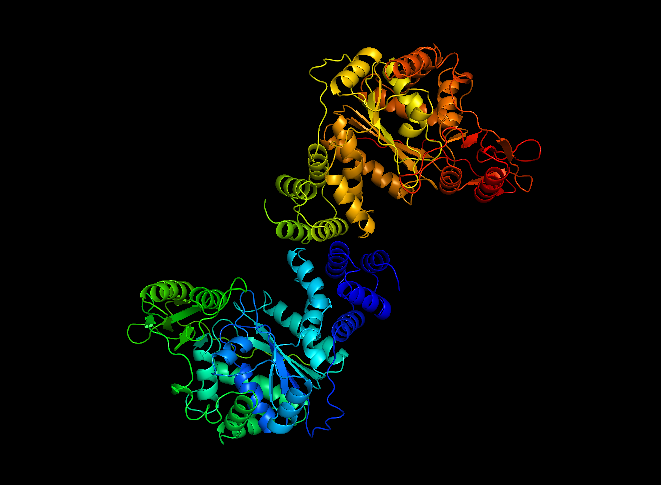
- Thymidine phosphorylase protein structure

Identifiers
- EC no.: 2.4.2.4
- CAS no.: 9030-23-3

Databases
- IntEnz: IntEnz view
- BRENDA: BRENDA entry
- ExPASy: NiceZyme view
- KEGG: KEGG entry
- MetaCyc: metabolic pathway
- PRIAM: profile
- PDB structures: RCSB PDB PDBe PDBsum
- Gene Ontology: AmiGO / QuickGO
Search
- PMC: articles
- PubMed: articles
- NCBI: proteins

Thymidine phosphorylase (EC 2.4.2.4) is an enzyme that is encoded by the TYMP gene and catalyzes several phosphorolysis reactions which convert pyrimidine nucleosides such as thymidine, into their corresponding nucleotide base, by cleavage of the 2-deoxy-α-D-ribose 1-phosphate sugar unit:

thymidine
P_{i}
P_{i}
2-deoxy-α-D-ribose 1-phosphate
+
thymine

Thymidine phosphorylase is involved in purine metabolism, pyrimidine metabolism, and other metabolic pathways. Variations in thymidine phosphorylase and the TYMP gene that encode it are associated with mitochondrial neurogastrointestinal encephalopathy (MNGIE) syndrome and bladder cancer.

== Function ==
Thymidine phosphorylase plays a key role in pyrimidine salvage to recover nucleosides after DNA/RNA degradation. Although the reaction it catalyzes between thymidine/deoxyuridine and their respective bases is reversible, the enzyme's function is primarily catabolic, that is, to break down the compound into two fragments: a sugar unit and a heterocycle.

Thymidine phosphorylase is also involved in angiogenesis, the formation of new blood vessels. Experiments show that if the enzyme is inhibited by treatment with 6-amino-5-chlorouracil, angiogenesis does not occur, suggesting that the enzymatic activity is part of the process. Thymidine phosphorylase has been determined to be almost identical to the platelet-derived endothelial cell growth factor (PD-ECGF). Although the mechanism of angiogenesis by thymidine phosphorylase is not yet known, reports show that the enzyme itself is not a growth factor but indirectly causes angiogenesis by stimulating chemotaxis of endothelial and other cells. Some reports suggest that thymidine phosphorylase promotes endothelial cell growth by reducing levels of thymidine that would otherwise inhibit endothelial cell growth. An alternative explanation is that the enzyme’s products induce angiogenesis. Experiments have found that 2-deoxyribose is an endothelial-cell chemoattractant and angiogenesis-inducing factor, which supports this explanation. Research has found thymidine phosphorylase is involved in angiogenesis during the menstrual cycle. The enzyme's expression in the endometrium is raised by a combination of progesterone and transforming growth factor-β1 and varies over the course of the menstrual cycle.

== Mechanism ==
Thymidine phosphorylase catalyzes the reversible phosphorylation of thymidine, deoxyuridine, and their analogs (except deoxycytidine) to their respective bases (thymine/uracil) and 2-deoxyribose 1-phosphate. The enzyme follows a sequential mechanism, where phosphate binds before thymidine (or deoxyuridine, etc.) and 2-deoxyribose 1-phosphate leaves after the nitrogenous base. The thymidine is bound in a high-energy conformation, in which the glycosidic bond weakens as the phosphate attacks the C1 position of the ribose ring, as shown below. The enzyme can then transfer deoxyribose 1-phosphate to other nitrogenous bases.

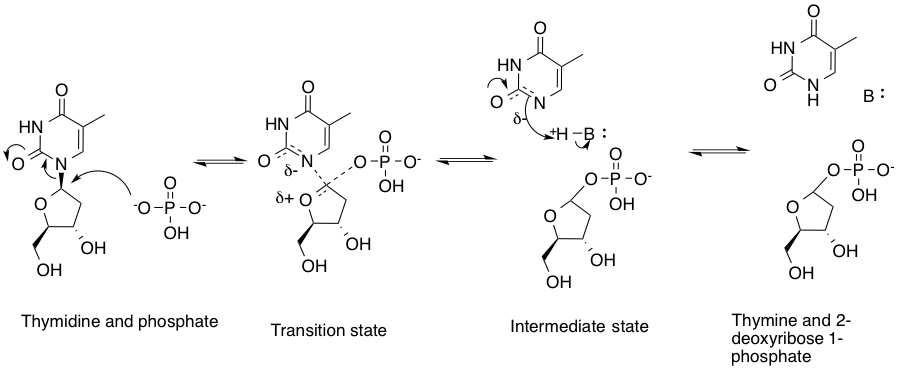
Thymidine phosphorylase mechanism

Further experiments have shown that thymine inhibits the enzyme via both substrate inhibition and nonlinear product inhibition. This suggests that thymine can inhibit the enzyme via multiple sites. The enzyme also displays cooperativity with respect to both thymidine and phosphate in the presence of thymine, which suggests that thymidine phosphorylase has several allosteric and/or catalytic sites as well.

== Structure ==
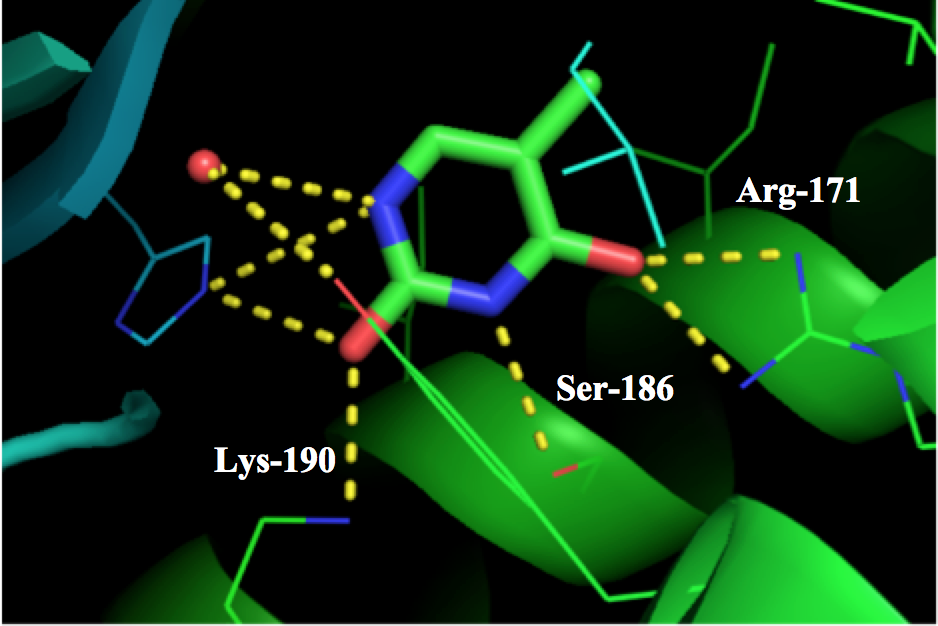
Arg-171, Ser-186, and Lys-190 interactions with thymine in ligand site of thymidine phosphorylase

Thymidine phosphorylase is a protein dimer with identical subunits – with a reported molecular weight of 90,000 daltons in Escherichia coli. It has an S-shape with a length of 110 Å and a width of 60 Å. Each monomer is composed of 440 amino acids and is composed of a small α-helical domain and a large α/β domain. The surface of the enzyme is smooth except for a 10 Å deep and 8 Å wide cavity between the two domains that contains the thymine, thymidine, and phosphate binding sites. Detailed analysis of the binding sites shows that Arg-171, Ser-186, and Lys-190 are the important residues in binding the pyrimidine base. The residues Arg-171 and Lys-190 are close to O4 and O2 of the thymine ring, respectively, and can help stabilize the intermediate state. The terminal amino group of Lys-190, which forms a hydrogen bond with the 3′-hydroxyl of the thymidine ribose moiety is also in place to donate a proton to thymine N1 during the intermediate state. As of late 2007, 6 structures have been solved for this class of enzymes, with PDB accession codes 1AZY, 1OTP, 1TPT, 1UOU, 2J0F, and 2TPT.

== Nomenclature ==
This enzyme is categorised as a glycosyltransferase, specifically a pentosyltransferase. The systematic name of its class is thymidine:phosphate deoxy-alpha-D-ribosyltransferase. Other names in common use include pyrimidine phosphorylase, thymidine-orthophosphate deoxyribosyltransferase, animal growth regulators, blood platelet-derived endothelial cell, growth factors, blood platelet-derived endothelial cell growth factor, deoxythymidine phosphorylase, gliostatins, pyrimidine deoxynucleoside phosphorylase, and thymidine:phosphate deoxy-D-ribosyltransferase.

== Disease relevance ==
Mitochondrial neurogastrointestinal encephalomyopathy (MNGIE) is an autosomal recessive disorder caused by mutations in the thymidine phosphorylase (TP) gene. Because mitochondrial DNA (mtDNA) depends strongly on thymidine salvage (more so than nuclear DNA), it suffers damage from thymidine phosphorylase deficiency. In MNGIE disease, multiple deletions and depletion of mtDNA accumulate over time, leading to mitochondrial dysfunction. Symptoms of MNGIE disease include diarrhea and abdominal pain as a result of dysmotility, caused by neuromuscular dysfunction, as well as ptosis, ophthalmoparesis, peripheral neuropathy, and hearing loss.

Thymidine phosphorylase has also been found to play a dual role in both cancer development and therapy. The enzyme's angiogenic activity promotes tumor growth, as supported by research showing much higher expression and activity of thymidine phosphorylase in malignant tumors (including carcinomas in the esophagus, stomach, colorectum, pancreas, and lung) than in adjacent non-neoplastic tissues Thymidine phosphorylase in these carcinomas is up-regulated by cytokines interferon-γ and TNF-α, which are released by inflammatory cells during wound healing. The enzyme is also up-regulated by low oxygen levels and low pH environments in order to control vascularization of hypoxic regions.

However, thymidine phosphorylase has also been found to play an essential role in the activation of the anti-cancer drug capecitabine. Specifically, it converts the intermediate metabolite 5’-deoxy-5-fluorocytidine in tumors to 5-fluorouracil, which acts as a thymidylate synthase inhibitor.
