= POLG2 =

Protein-coding gene in the species Homo sapiens

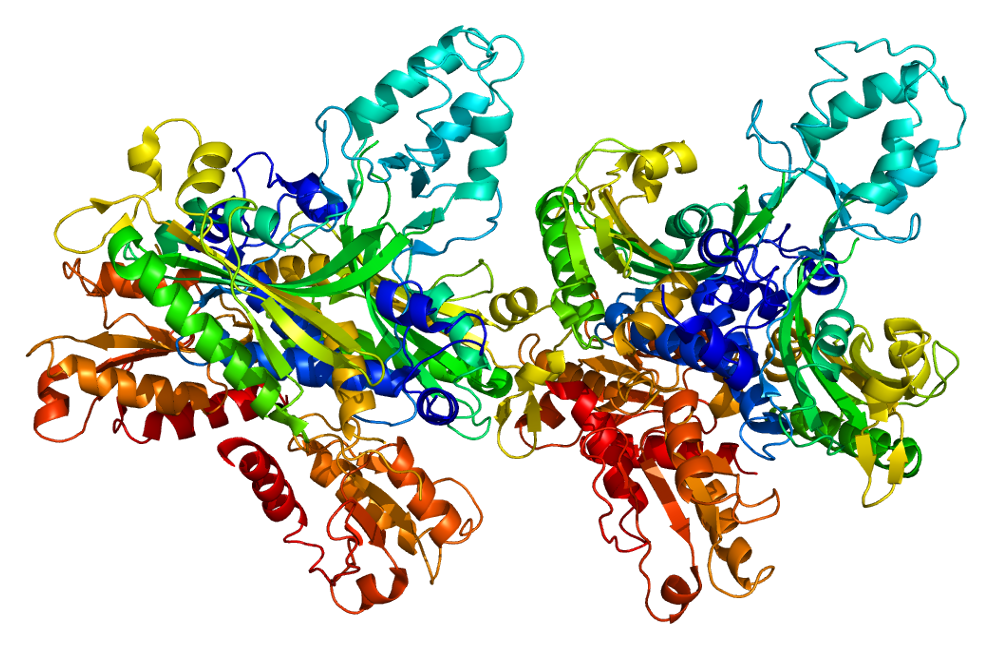

Identifiers
- Aliases: POLG2, HP55, MTPOLB, PEOA4, POLB, POLG-BETA, POLGB, polymerase (DNA) gamma 2, accessory subunit, DNA polymerase gamma 2, accessory subunit, MTDPS16, MTDPS16A, MTDPS16B
- External IDs: OMIM: 604983; MGI: 1354947; GeneCards: POLG2
Available structures
PDB	Ortholog search: PDBe RCSB
PDB	List of PDB id codes 2G4C, 3IKL, 3IKM, 4ZTU, 4ZTZ, 5C53, 5C51, 5C52

Gene location (Human)
Chr.	Chromosome 17 (human)
Band	17q23.3	Start	64,477,785 bp
Band	17q23.3	End	64,497,054 bp

Gene location (Mouse)
Chr.	Chromosome 11 (mouse)
Band	11|11 E1	Start	106,659,079 bp
Band	11|11 E1	End	106,670,363 bp
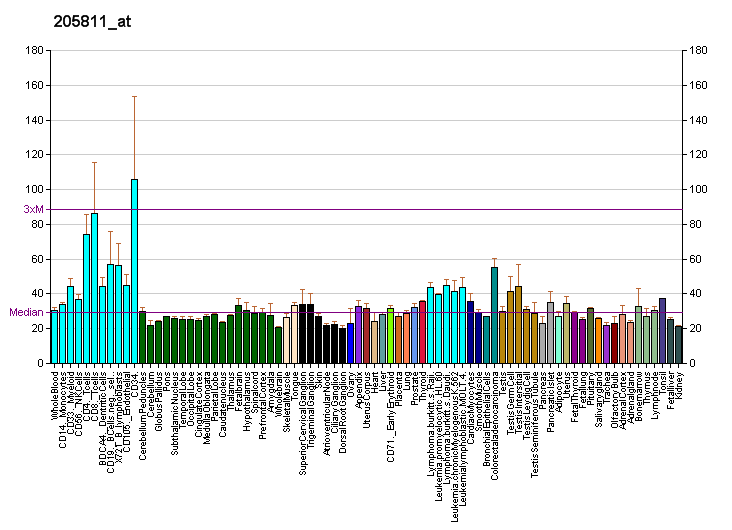
RNA expression pattern
Bgee	Human / Mouse (ortholog); Top expressed in: secondary oocyte; left testis; right testis; left ovary; right ovary; right uterine tube; granulocyte; monocyte; lymph node; spleen / Top expressed in: retinal pigment epithelium; epithelium of lens; granulocyte; Paneth cell; neural layer of retina; primitive streak; left lobe of liver; fossa; condyle; jejunum; More reference expression data
BioGPS	More reference expression data
Gene ontology
Molecular function	transferase activity; DNA binding; nucleotidyltransferase activity; protein binding; glycine-tRNA ligase activity; identical protein binding; DNA-directed DNA polymerase activity
Cellular component	mitochondrial chromosome; mitochondrial matrix; mitochondrion; mitochondrial nucleoid; cytoplasm
Biological process	DNA-dependent DNA replication; mitochondrial DNA metabolic process; mitochondrion organization; in utero embryonic development; DNA replication; respiratory electron transport chain; mitochondrion morphogenesis; DNA repair; DNA biosynthetic process; mitochondrial glycyl-tRNA aminoacylation; mitochondrial DNA replication
Sources:Amigo / QuickGO
Orthologs
Databases	NCBI: entry; OMA: entry
Species	Human	Mouse
Entrez	11232	50776
Ensembl	ENSG00000256525	ENSMUSG00000020718
UniProt	Q9UHN1	Q9QZM2
RefSeq (mRNA)	NM_007215	NM_015810; NM_001353435
RefSeq (protein)	NP_009146	NP_056625; NP_001340364
Location (UCSC)	Chr 17: 64.48 – 64.5 Mb	Chr 11: 106.66 – 106.67 Mb
PubMed search
- Wikidata
View/Edit Human	View/Edit Mouse

DNA polymerase subunit gamma-2, mitochondrial is a protein that in humans is encoded by the POLG2 gene. The POLG2 gene encodes a 55 kDa accessory subunit protein that imparts high processivity and salt tolerance to the catalytic subunit of DNA polymerase gamma, encoded by the POLG gene. Mutations in this gene result in autosomal dominant progressive external ophthalmoplegia with mitochondrial DNA deletions.

== Structure ==
POLG2 is located on the q arm of chromosome 17 in position 23.3 and has 8 exons. POLG2, the protein encoded by this gene, contains a phosphoserine modified residue at p. 38 and a transit peptide. Its structure consists of 25 beta strands, 21 alpha helixes, and 8 turns.

== Function ==
POLG2 encodes the processivity subunit of the mitochondrial DNA polymerase gamma. The encoded protein forms a heterotrimer containing one catalytic subunit and two processivity subunits. This protein enhances DNA binding, stimulates polymerase and exonuclease activity, and promotes processive DNA synthesis.

=== Catalytic activity ===
Deoxynucleoside triphosphate + DNA(n) = diphosphate + DNA(n+1)

== Clinical significance ==
Mutations in POLG2 have been associated with progressive external ophthalmoplegia with mitochondrial DNA deletions. This disease results in progressive weakness of ocular muscles and levator muscle of the upper eyelid and patients with it may also manifest skeletal myopathy, ragged-red fibers and atrophy shown on muscle biopsy, cataracts, hearing loss, sensory axonal neuropathy, ataxia, depression, hypogonadism, and parkinsonism. This mutlisystemic disease has been linked to a G451E mutation that disrupts the DNA polymerase gamma subunits.

In patients with chronic hepatitis C, those carrying the DDX5 minor allele or DDX5-POLG2 haplotypes are thought to be at an increased risk of advanced fibrosis. That those carrying the CPT1A minor allele are believed to be at a decreased risk.

== Interactions ==
POLG2 has been shown to have 39 binary protein-protein interactions including 19 co-complex interactions. POLG2 appears to interact with POLG.
