= POLG =

Protein-coding gene in the species Homo sapiens

Identifiers
- Aliases: POLG, MDP1, MIRAS, MTDPS4A, MTDPS4B, PEO, POLG1, POLGA, SANDO, SCAE, polymerase (DNA) gamma, catalytic subunit, DNA polymerase gamma, catalytic subunit, ORF-Y, POLGARF
- External IDs: OMIM: 174763; MGI: 1196389; GeneCards: POLG
Available structures
PDB	Ortholog search: PDBe RCSB
PDB	List of PDB id codes 3IKM, 4ZTU, 4ZTZ, 5C53, 5C52, 5C51
Enzyme activity
EC #	BRENDA	ExPASy	KEGG	MetaCyc
2.7.7.7	↗	↗	↗	↗

Gene location (Human)
Chr.	Chromosome 15 (human)
Band	15q26.1	Start	89,305,198 bp
Band	15q26.1	End	89,334,861 bp

Gene location (Mouse)
Chr.	Chromosome 7 (mouse)
Band	7|7 D2	Start	79,095,979 bp
Band	7|7 D2	End	79,116,110 bp
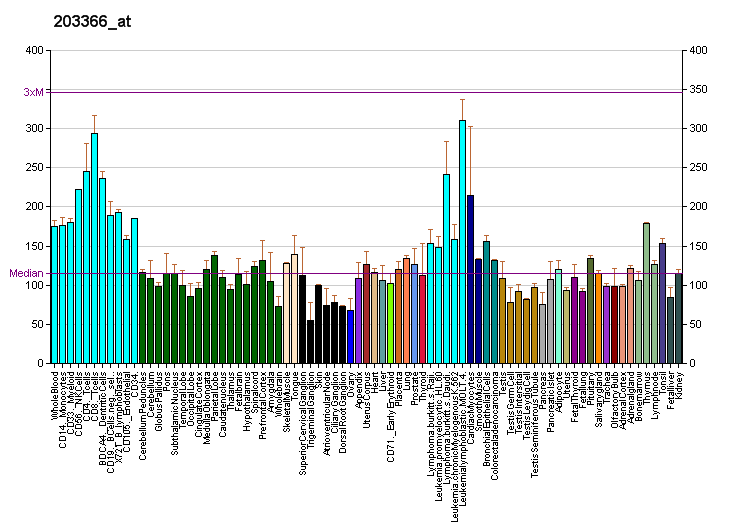

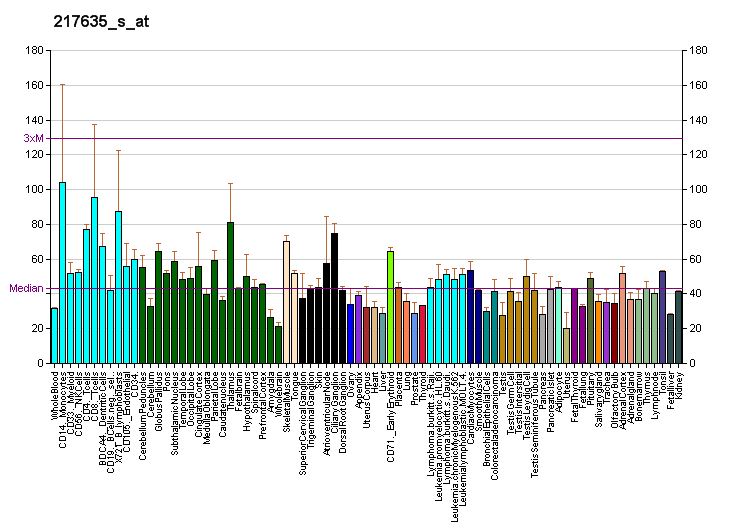
RNA expression pattern
Bgee	Human / Mouse (ortholog); Top expressed in: granulocyte; tibial nerve; transverse colon; body of stomach; right lobe of thyroid gland; body of pancreas; spleen; apex of heart; body of uterus; minor salivary glands / Top expressed in: spermatocyte; spermatid; yolk sac; ventricular zone; granulocyte; dentate gyrus of hippocampal formation granule cell; superior frontal gyrus; epiblast; thymus; muscle of thigh; More reference expression data
BioGPS	More reference expression data
Gene ontology
Molecular function	protein binding; transferase activity; 3'-5' exonuclease activity; nucleotidyltransferase activity; chromatin binding; protease binding; DNA binding; DNA-directed DNA polymerase activity
Cellular component	terminal bouton; gamma DNA polymerase complex; mitochondrial nucleoid; mitochondrion; protein-containing complex
Biological process	DNA replication; response to gamma radiation; cellular response to glucose stimulus; DNA metabolic process; response to light stimulus; DNA-dependent DNA replication; ageing; response to hyperoxia; base-excision repair, gap-filling; nucleic acid phosphodiester bond hydrolysis; DNA biosynthetic process; mitochondrial DNA replication
Sources:Amigo / QuickGO
Orthologs
Databases	NCBI: entry; OMA: entry
Species	Human	Mouse
Entrez	5428	18975
Ensembl	ENSG00000140521	ENSMUSG00000039176
UniProt	P54098	P54099
RefSeq (mRNA)	NM_002693; NM_001126131	NM_017462; NM_001360095; NM_001360096
RefSeq (protein)	NP_001119603; NP_002684	n/a
Location (UCSC)	Chr 15: 89.31 – 89.33 Mb	Chr 7: 79.1 – 79.12 Mb
PubMed search
- Wikidata
View/Edit Human	View/Edit Mouse

DNA polymerase subunit gamma (POLG or POLG1) is an enzyme that in humans is encoded by the POLG gene. Mitochondrial DNA polymerase is heterotrimeric, consisting of a homodimer of accessory subunits plus a catalytic subunit. The protein encoded by this gene is the catalytic subunit of mitochondrial DNA polymerase. Defects in this gene are a cause of progressive external ophthalmoplegia with mitochondrial DNA deletions 1 (PEOA1), sensory ataxic neuropathy dysarthria and ophthalmoparesis (SANDO), Alpers-Huttenlocher syndrome (AHS), and mitochondrial neurogastrointestinal encephalopathy syndrome (MNGIE).

== Structure ==
POLG is located on the q arm of chromosome 15 in position 26.1 and has 23 exons. The POLG gene produces a 140 kDa protein composed of 1239 amino acids. POLG, the protein encoded by this gene, is a member of the DNA polymerase type-A family. It is a mitochondrion nucleoid with an Mg2+ cofactor and 15 turns, 52 beta strands, and 39 alpha helixes. POLG contains a polyglutamine tract near its N-terminus that may be polymorphic. Two transcript variants encoding the same protein have been found for this gene.

== Function ==
POLG is a gene that codes for the catalytic subunit of the mitochondrial DNA polymerase, called DNA polymerase gamma. The human POLG cDNA and gene were cloned and mapped to chromosome band 15q25. In eukaryotic cells, the mitochondrial DNA is replicated by DNA polymerase gamma, a trimeric protein complex composed of a catalytic subunit, POLG, and a dimeric accessory subunit of 55 kDa encoded by the POLG2 gene. The catalytic subunit contains three enzymatic activities, a DNA polymerase activity, a 3’-5’ exonuclease activity that proofreads misincorporated nucleotides, and a 5’-dRP lyase activity required for base excision repair. POLG activity is coordinated with mitochondrial SSB activity during DNA replication.

=== Catalytic activity ===
Deoxynucleoside triphosphate + DNA(n) = diphosphate + DNA(n+1).

== Clinical significance ==
Mutations in the POLG gene are associated with several mitochondrial diseases, progressive external ophthalmoplegia with mitochondrial DNA deletions 1 (PEOA1), sensory ataxic neuropathy dysarthria and ophthalmoparesis (SANDO), Alpers-Huttenlocher syndrome (AHS), and mitochondrial neurogastrointestinal encephalopathy syndrome (MNGIE). Pathogenic variants have also been linked with fatal congenital myopathy and gastrointestinal pseudo-obstruction and fatal infantile hepatic failure. A list of all published mutations in the POLG coding region and their associated disease can be found at the Human DNA Polymerase Gamma Mutation Database.

Mice heterozygous for a Polg mutation are only able to replicate their mitochondrial DNA inaccurately, so that they sustain a 500-fold higher mutation burden than normal mice. These mice show no clear features of rapidly accelerated aging, indicating that mitochondrial mutations do not have a causal role in natural aging.

== Interactions ==
POLG has been shown to have 50 binary protein-protein interactions including 32 co-complex interactions. POLG appears to interact with POLG2, Dlg4, Tp53, and Sod2.

== Notable people with mutations in this gene ==
- Prince Frederik of Nassau (2002–2025), a member of the Grand Ducal family of Luxembourg
