= TYMP =

Protein-coding gene in the species Homo sapiens

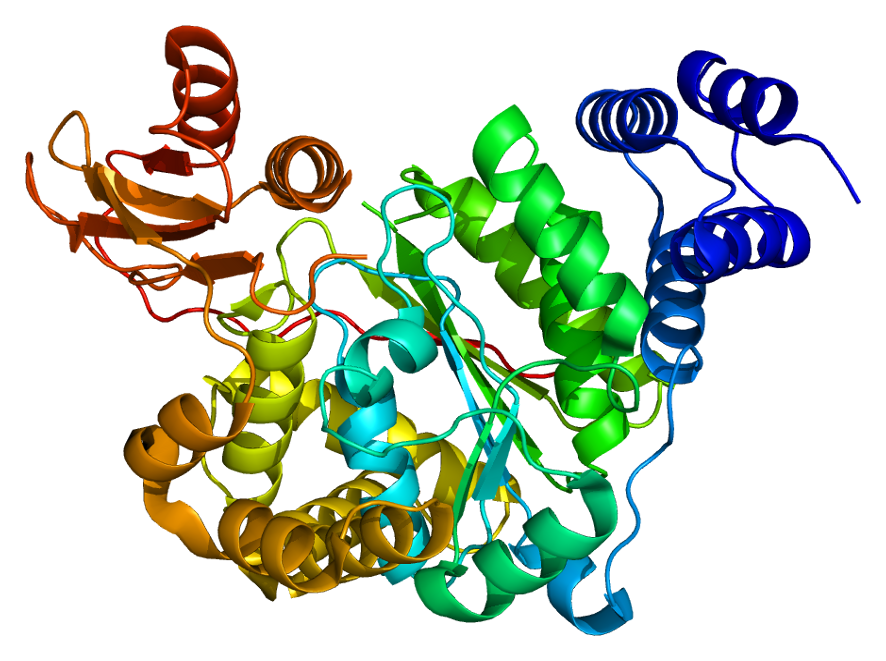

Identifiers
- Aliases: TYMP, thymidine phosphorylase, ECGF, ECGF1, MEDPS1, MNGIE, MTDPS1, PDECGF, TP, hPD-ECGF
- External IDs: OMIM: 131222; MGI: 1920212; GeneCards: TYMP
Available structures
PDB	Ortholog search: PDBe RCSB
PDB	List of PDB id codes 1UOU, 2J0F, 2WK5, 2WK6
Enzyme activity
EC #	BRENDA	ExPASy	KEGG	MetaCyc
2.4.2.4	↗	↗	↗	↗

Gene location (Human)
Chr.	Chromosome 22 (human)
Band	22q13.33	Start	50,525,752 bp
Band	22q13.33	End	50,530,032 bp

Gene location (Mouse)
Chr.	Chromosome 15 (mouse)
Band	15 E3|15 44.86 cM	Start	89,256,134 bp
Band	15 E3|15 44.86 cM	End	89,261,242 bp
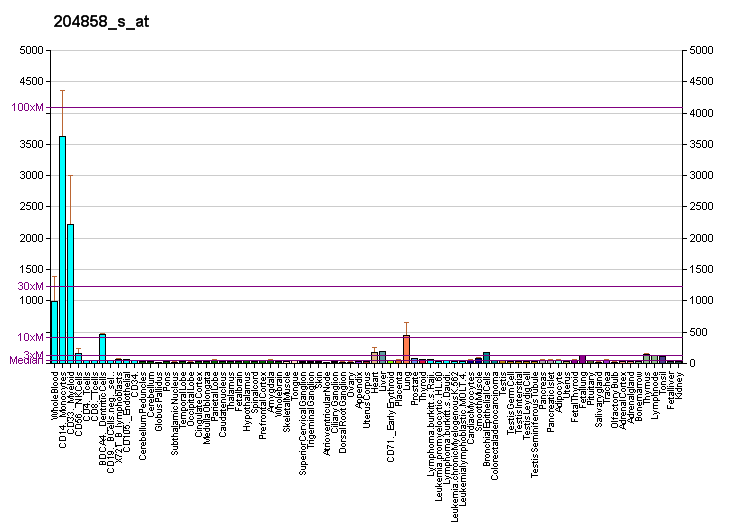

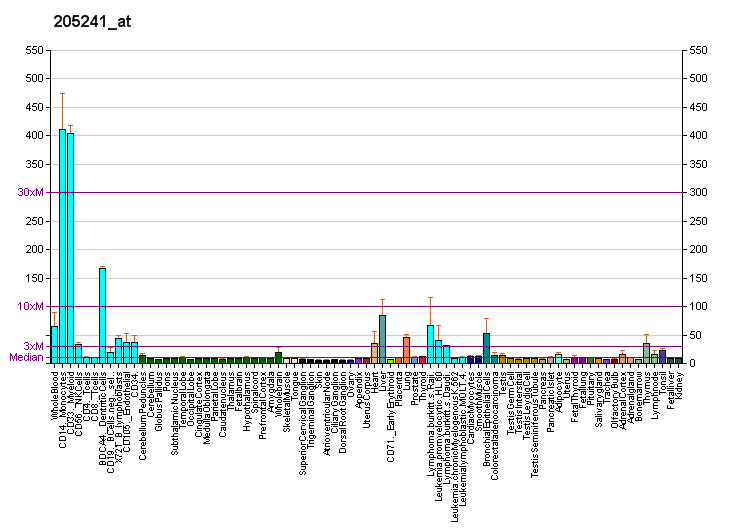
RNA expression pattern
Bgee	Human / Mouse (ortholog); Top expressed in: right uterine tube; granulocyte; monocyte; right lung; upper lobe of left lung; olfactory zone of nasal mucosa; spleen; apex of heart; blood; right lobe of liver / Top expressed in: liver; jejunum; colon; duodenum; spermatocyte; vagina; spermatid; testicle; proximal tubule; lung; More reference expression data
BioGPS	More reference expression data
Gene ontology
Molecular function	transferase activity; glycosyltransferase activity; pyrimidine-nucleoside phosphorylase activity; growth factor activity; pentosyltransferase activity; 1,4-alpha-oligoglucan phosphorylase activity; thymidine phosphorylase activity; protein homodimerization activity
Cellular component	cytosol
Biological process	cell differentiation; pyrimidine nucleoside salvage; pyrimidine nucleoside catabolic process; multicellular organism development; chemotaxis; angiogenesis; metabolism; pyrimidine nucleobase metabolic process; mitochondrial genome maintenance; pyrimidine nucleoside metabolic process; regulation of myelination; regulation of transmission of nerve impulse; regulation of gastric motility; regulation of signaling receptor activity; signal transduction
Sources:Amigo / QuickGO
Orthologs
Databases	NCBI: entry; OMA: entry
Species	Human	Mouse
Entrez	1890	72962
Ensembl	ENSG00000025708	ENSMUSG00000022615
UniProt	P19971	Q99N42
RefSeq (mRNA)	NM_001953; NM_001113755; NM_001113756; NM_001257988; NM_001257989	NM_138302; NM_028405
RefSeq (protein)	NP_001107227; NP_001107228; NP_001244917; NP_001244918; NP_001944	NP_612175
Location (UCSC)	Chr 22: 50.53 – 50.53 Mb	Chr 15: 89.26 – 89.26 Mb
PubMed search
- Wikidata
View/Edit Human	View/Edit Mouse

TYMP is a gene that encodes for the enzyme thymidine phosphorylase. The TYMP gene is also known as ECGF1 (endothelial cell growth factor 1, platelet-derived) and MNGIE due to its role in MNGIE syndrome.

== Structure ==
The TYMP gene is located on chromosome 22 in humans and contains 10 exons spanning more than 4.3 kb.

== Function ==
TYMP encodes for the enzyme thymidine phosphorylase. TYMP and thymidine phosphorylase are associated with angiogenesis, growth of endothelial cells, and mitochondrial neurogastrointestinal encephalomyopathy (MNGIE).

Thymidine phosphorylase is angiogenic growth factor which promotes angiogenesis in vivo and stimulates the in vitro growth of a variety of endothelial cells. Thymidine phosphorylase has a highly restricted target cell specificity acting only on endothelial cells, hence its alternative name of ECGF1. Because it limits glial cell proliferation, thymidine phosphorylase is also known as gliostatin. Thymidine phosphorylase activity in leukocytes from mitochondrial neurogastrointestinal encephalomyopathy (MNGIE) patients was less than 5 percent of controls, indicating that loss-of-function mutations in TYMP cause MNGIE.

== Interactive pathway map ==
Click on genes, proteins and metabolites below to link to respective articles. (Note: The interactive pathway map can be edited at WikiPathways: "FluoropyrimidineActivity_WP1601".)

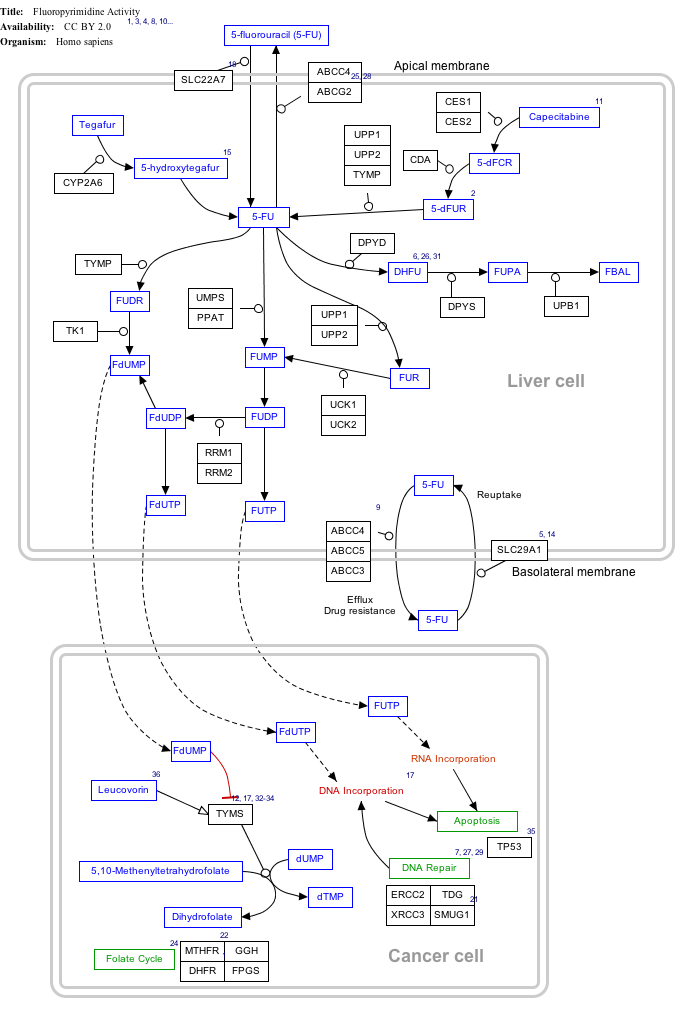

Fluorouracil (5-FU) Activity edit
