= Epigenetics of bipolar disorder =

Field of study

Epigenetics of bipolar disorder is the effect that epigenetics has on triggering and maintaining bipolar disorder. Bipolar disorder is a chronic mood disorder, characterized by manic and depressive episodes. The symptoms of a manic episode include high mood, low sleep, and reduced inhibition, while the symptoms of a depressive episode include low mood, lethargy, and reduced motivation.

There are different types of bipolar disorders; the two most common are bipolar I and bipolar II. Patients are diagnosed with bipolar disorder I if their manic episodes last at least seven consecutive days and they experience major depressive symptoms over the course of two weeks. In bipolar disorder II, patients experience shorter hypomanic episodes or manic symptoms that have less disruptive impacts on their daily lives. Sometimes patients can experience extreme cycling where they experience four or more episodes of mania and major depression in one year.

In addition to affecting mood, people who have bipolar disorder often deal with impaired cognitive abilities, where memory, speech, attention and decision-making skills are all impacted. Bipolar disorder has one of the highest rates of suicide amongst psychiatric disorders, as well as high comorbidity rates with alcohol and substance use disorders.

Bipolar disorder has a genetic component. This means that the sequence of nucleotides in DNA contains information that can lead to bipolar disorder in individuals. Researchers determined that bipolar disorder has a genetic component by comparing individuals who have been diagnosed with the disorder and those who have not. However, findings are inconsistent as to what specific genes are involved.

The trouble that researchers have had in conclusively identifying genes that cause bipolar disorder has led them to search for an epigenetic component to bipolar disorder. Epigenetics is the study of heritable phenotypes that occur without changes to the primary DNA sequence. Typically, epigenetics focuses on the expression and regulation of genes. Common epigenetic mechanisms include DNA methylation, and histone modification. More research into the epigenetics behind bipolar disorder is required to reach a firm conclusion, however current results have yielded promising information that supports the idea that bipolar disorder is caused by a combination of genetic and epigenetic factors.

== Impact of gene methylation ==
DNA methylation is a commonly researched form of epigenetic modification for its role in decreasing gene expression. DNA methylation works by adding methyl groups to DNA molecules. These affect the activity of gene without actually changing the DNA sequence. DNA methylation has been shown to recruit proteins, like DNA-methyl binding proteins and polycomb proteins, that are implicated in gene repression and prevent transcription factors from binding to DNA. DNA methylation has also been shown to affect the expression of genes with important neuronal implications, such as the BDNF gene and serotonergic genes.

=== DNA methylation of the BDNF gene ===
The brain-derived neurotrophic factor (BDNF) gene plays a role in the growth, differentiation, and maintenance of neurons. There have been consistent differences observed between bipolar disorder patients and controls in the cytosine methylation levels of the BDNF gene promoter regions 3 and 5. The type of methylation at these regions is methylation of cytosine nucleotides. Typically, hypermethylation of these promoter regions is observed in patients with bipolar disorder. Hypermethylation of the BDNF genes in neurons from frontal cortex was observed in patients with bipolar disorder. When the promoter of the BDNF genes is hypermethylated, BDNF's expression is reduced and therefore decreased levels of BDNF.

Furthermore, patients with bipolar disorder have been shown to have lower levels of BDNF mRNA, showing that the increased methylation is indeed producing lower amounts of transcript. Decreased levels of BDNF have also been found in post mortem tissues of people who committed suicide and people with schizophrenia. However, BDNF gene promoter region 1 did not have major differences in methylation level between bipolar disorder groups and control groups.

When taking into consideration pharmaceutical treatment, subjects who are on both mood stabilizers and antidepressants are found to have higher levels of DNA methylation at this gene than those who are only on mood stabilizing treatments. Positive correlations have been found between BDNF increased methylation levels and childhood trauma, severity of depression, impulsivity, and hopelessness. Patients with bipolar disorder and in a depressive states have far more methylation of the promoter for BDNF than patients in manic or mixed states. There is a strong body of evidence implicating BDNF as a critical component within bipolar disorder. Changes in methylation of this gene or its regulatory sequences can affect the levels of BDNF within an individual.

=== Serotonergic genes ===
The neurotransmitter serotonin is known for its function as a mood stabilizer and its role in regulating a variety of nervous system functions such as sleep, memory, learning, and mood. Low serotonin levels are typically observed in the depressive phase of bipolar disorder 1. Increased methylation of the 5-HTT transporter and 5-HTR1A receptor genes of the serotonergic system were observed in individuals with bipolar disorder.

The 5-HTT transporter is responsible for the reuptake of serotonin from the synaptic cleft back into the presynaptic cell after initial release. This function halts the effect of serotonin on the receptors on the post-synaptic cell and allows the presynaptic cell to replenish its stores of the neurotransmitter. Hypermethylation of the genes encoding this transporter lead to reduced expression of this transporter, and the resulting decrease in presynaptic reuptake is thought to decrease overall serotonin levels in the brain.

5HTR1A receptors are found all throughout the brain, involved in many central nervous system functions like sleep, sex drive, and mood. One of the main functions of this receptor is its role as an autoreceptor on neurons that release serotonin. Binding of serotonin to the 5HTR1A receptor on a serotonergic neuron initiates a negative feedback loop that halts further release of serotonin by the neuron. This results in diminished serotonin-induced effects in the post-synaptic cells and maintains the stores of this neurotransmitter in the presynaptic cell. Methylation of the promoter region in the gene encoding the 5HTR1A receptor decreases the concentration of this receptor throughout the brain. Thus, the negative feedback loop regulating the transmission of serotonin is diminished, leading to longer periods of serotonin binding to post-synaptic cells and decreased presynaptic stores of serotonin.

=== Other genes ===
The two genes above are the most researched ones; however, there are still some other genes that are found to have different levels of methylation compared to control patients. An example of this is in the KCNQ3 gene. This gene encodes a potassium channel which function to prevent hyperexcitability of a neuron. In the CpG region of exon 11, one observes individuals with bipolar disorder having significantly lower methylation levels compared to individuals who do not have bipolar disorder. This data was collected from post-mortem individuals that had bipolar disorder. There was no overall conclusion on the effect of this methylation difference on gene expression; however, it is clear that further research should be conducted on this gene. David Miklowitz, in his book "The Bipolar Disorder Survival Guide" mentions some other genes that may be involved in Biopolar disorder. He listed the gene for NMDA, MAOA, CAC-NAIC, TENM4, and NCAN.

== In relation to other diseases ==
Bipolar disorder is classified as a mood disorder which is a classification of mental and behavioral disorders that include characteristics such as manic episodes, depressive episodes, recurrent depressive disorders, and persistent mood disorders and more. Major depressive disorder is a type of mood disorder commonly known as clinical depression and it is categorized by an individual having low mood, low self-esteem, and loss of pleasure in activities the individual once enjoyed. Bipolar Disorder and Major Depressive Disorder have been closely linked due to the similar depressive symptoms and similar monoaminergic systems that have been thought to underlie these conditions.

Much of the research for bipolar disorder is done in conjunction with studies of other diseases, most commonly schizophrenia and major depressive disorder. Bipolar disorder overlaps with schizophrenia in the possible psychotic features in both of these disorders and the depressive episodes in bipolar disorder are similar to those in major depressive disorder.

Despite being different disorders, the similarity in overlapping symptoms suggest that there are common underlying biological regulatory systems that are being disordered and has resulted in research for these disorders yielding similar results. Family, twin, and adoption studies have yielded results that there is a genetic component to mood disorders. Genetic mapping studies have tried to find the genes responsible for these mood disorders, however, they have not produced consistent results. Researchers have yet to definitively pinpoint a genetic polymorphism or mutation that underlies these disorders.

Bipolar disorder has been found to be comorbid with several other disorders. Anxiety disorder comorbidity with bipolar disorder is common, as half of people with bipolar disorder are likely to be diagnosed with some form of anxiety disorder. Schizophrenia and bipolar disorder are also considered to be comorbid, and it has been found that abnormalities in white matter, including the level of myelination and organization of axonal fibers, are common to both conditions. Bipolar disorder has also been found to be comorbid with obsessive compulsive disorder and it has resulted in higher suicide rates for comorbid patients than noncomorbid patients.

Increasingly, evidence points towards abnormalities in epigenetic mechanism as a reason behind mood disorders such as major depressive disorder and schizophrenia. Alterations in methylation and histone modification have been found to be underlying epigenetic mechanisms in these disorders.

Hypomethylation of the genes for catechol-O-methyltransferase (MB-COMT), an enzyme that is responsible for breaking down catecholamines, were found in both schizophrenia and bipolar disorder patients. Catecholamines are known for being important mood regulators. Hypomethylation of these genes suggests that an increased production of this enzyme results in an increased degradation of neurotransmitters, such as dopamine, and could provide an epigenetic and molecular reason as to why these mood disorders form.

Brain-derived neurotrophic factor (BDNF) plays a major role in both bipolar disorder and major depressive disorder. BDNF is a neurotrophin that is critical for development due to its role in plasticity and stress response. Hypermethylation of the promoter for the BDNF genes has been found in patients both with bipolar disorder and major depressive disorder.

When the promoter of the BDNF genes is hypermethylated, BDNF's expression is reduced and therefore decreased levels of BDNF. Patients with bipolar disorder and in a depressive states have far more methylation of the promoter than patients in manic or mixed states. This confirms BDNF's essential role in the formation of depressive states and explains why it is present in both bipolar disorder and major depressive disorder as both disorders are categorized by depressive states.

Lower expression of BDNF in the frontal cortex and hippocampal region has also been shown in schizophrenia patients and within these patients, methylation of the promoter site was a common occurrence. BDNF is clearly a critical protein in the body and lower levels of it can have critical consequences for a person whether it's bipolar disorder or another serious mental health condition.

== Epigenetic treatments ==
The most common current treatments for bipolar disorder involve utilizing mood stabilizers in order to prevent and treat manic and depressive episodes. Lithium is the most common mood stabilizer used and is considered the most effective. Other drugs that are commonly prescribed include anticonvulsants such as valproic acid, lamotrigine, carbamazepine, and oxcarbazepine.

However, current treatments yield mixed results as within one year of receiving treatment, it has been found that 37% of BD patients relapse back into a depressive or manic episode. Within two years of receiving treatment, that number increases to 60% of patients who have a relapse.

There are some patients who are thought to be treatment resistant. Patients who do not significantly respond to treatment for 6 weeks in mania, 12 weeks in bipolar disorder depression and 12 months or longer for long-term treatment are categorized as having treatment-resistant bipolar disorder.

While most current drugs and treatments are meant to stabilize the patients mood or control mood swings, they have not been shown to improve the decline of cognitive abilities and, in fact, could magnify cognitive decline. Given the current lack of treatments that mainly effect neurotransmitter levels, researchers think that epigenetic treatments may be a potential solution given the epigenetic factors in bipolar disorder.

Besides pharmacological treatment of bipolar disorder, psychotherapy is also utilized. Individuals with bipolar I and II who underwent family-focused therapy alongside pharmaceutical treatment were found to have around 30 percent less relapse and re-hospitalization than bipolar individuals who didn't. However, the efficacy for cognitive-behavioral therapy is more inconclusive with different studies either saying it helped or there was no difference. In regards to the epigenetics of psychotherapy treatment, there is no strong research investigating correlation between the two.

=== Drugs that modify the epigenome ===
Histone deacetylase inhibitors and DNA methyltransferase inhibitors are commonly used in the treatment of bipolar disorder. Olanzapine, a medication used to treat both bipolar disorder and schizophrenia, has been shown to induce DNA methylation changes in dopamine receptor genes. It has been found that methylation increases in the hippocampus specifically, which was identified in rat populations. Olanzapine has been shown to be effective in decreasing manic symptoms, but its impact on depressive symptoms has not been statistically significant.

Quetiapine, an antipsychotic, has also been found to modulate DNA methylation. It binds favorably to 5-HT2A receptors, serotonin receptors that are implicated in bipolar disorder, alcohol use disorder, and depression. It has also been seen to increase DNA methylation. This drug has been tested on patient populations with bipolar disorder II, and it has been successful in alleviating mood symptoms and decreasing patients' overall scores on the Young Mania Rating Scale. This scale is relevant to bipolar individuals as it measures the severity of their mania and these decreased scores prove the effectiveness of Quetiapine.

Valproic acid, an HDAC1 inhibitor that is used to treat schizophrenia and bipolar disorder, has been shown to reverse the hypermethylation of the Reln gene that has been observed in patients with schizophrenia. Histone deacetylase proteins reverse the acetylation of histone proteins, suppressing DNA expression. Thus, HDAC1 inhibitors allow the acetyl groups attached to histones to remain in place. Acetyl groups on histone proteins can act as binding sites for bromodomain-containing proteins and other chromatin-remodeling proteins that promote transcription initiation. As DNA methylation decreases DNA suppression, these remaining acetyl groups on certain genes may recruit proteins that reverse methylation.

Valproic decreases DNA methylation at the CpG island of the Cdkn p21 promoter. It is believed that Reln genes could influence therapeutic response in bipolar disorder as well, especially since valproic acid is already being used as a treatment for bipolar disorder.

Lithium has been shown to significantly decrease methylation at the BDNF promoter IV along with an increase in BDNF mRNA levels in rats. This is important since the BDNF gene is believed to be associated with bipolar disorder pathophysiology. Lithium is also known as a histone deacetylase inhibitor.

In general, selective serotonin reuptake inhibitors are associated with the decrease of DNA methylation at the S100a10 gene promoter region. These findings were in rats; however, it is still believed to be useful in humans as well and that there are not many human studies that have investigated these epigenetic mechanisms. Overall, this indicates the large impact of DNA methylation in bipolar disorder treatment, as well as indicates the implication of epigenetics of bipolar disorder in general.

== See also ==
- Biology of bipolar disorder
- Outline of bipolar disorder
