= Kindling hypothesis of depression =

The kindling hypothesis of depression proposes that each episode of depression in individuals with major depressive disorder (MDD) induces lasting neurobiological and psychological changes that increase vulnerability to subsequent episodes. Early depressive episodes are more likely to be precipitated by major life stressors, whereas later episodes tend to occur with less severe stress or without identifiable external triggers, reflecting a progressive sensitization process.

== Background ==
The term kindling originates from experimental models of epilepsy, in which repeated subthreshold stimulation eventually produces spontaneous seizures. Applied to mood disorders, the hypothesis suggests that repeated depressive episodes may similarly lower the threshold required to trigger future episodes, independent of external stressors.

Several mechanisms have been proposed to account for kindling effects in depression:

- Stress sensitization: Over time, depressive episodes become less dependent on major life events and more likely to arise following minor stress or spontaneously.
- Neurocognitive alterations: Computational and cognitive models suggest that repeated depressive states may alter reference-dependent evaluation processes, contributing to persistent negative bias and reduced reward sensitivity across episodes.

== Empirical support ==
Longitudinal research has shown that the association between major life stressors and depressive onset weakens as the number of prior episodes increases, a pattern consistent with sensitization effects predicted by the kindling hypothesis. Computational modeling studies further support the plausibility of progressive cognitive alterations contributing to depressive recurrence.

Evidence for the kindling hypothesis is mixed. Studies differ in how life stress and depressive episodes are defined and measured, and results vary across samples. As a result, the hypothesis is generally treated as a heuristic model rather than a settled account of recurrence in major depressive disorder.

== Clinical implications ==
The hypothesis suggests that preventing relapse and treating early episodes may reduce long-term vulnerability to recurrent depression by limiting sensitization processes. However, the presence of kindling effects does not imply irreversibility, as later episodes may still respond to established therapeutic interventions.
