= TRANK1 =

Protein-coding gene in the species Homo sapiens

Identifiers
- Aliases: TRANK1, LBA1, tetratricopeptide repeat and ankyrin repeat containing 1
- External IDs: MGI: 1341834; GeneCards: TRANK1

Gene location (Human)
Chr.	Chromosome 3 (human)
Band	3p22.2	Start	36,826,819 bp
Band	3p22.2	End	36,945,057 bp

Gene location (Mouse)
Chr.	Chromosome 9 (mouse)
Band	9|9 F3	Start	111,140,807 bp
Band	9|9 F3	End	111,224,843 bp
RNA expression pattern
Bgee	Human / Mouse (ortholog); Top expressed in: right hemisphere of cerebellum; left uterine tube; jejunal mucosa; body of uterus; right uterine tube; canal of the cervix; blood; Descending thoracic aorta; granulocyte; rectum / Top expressed in: superior frontal gyrus; primary visual cortex; adrenal cortex; olfactory tubercle; lumbar subsegment of spinal cord; dentate gyrus of hippocampal formation granule cell; nucleus accumbens; piriform cortex; nucleus of stria terminalis; frenulum of tongue; More reference expression data
BioGPS	n/a
Orthologs
Databases	NCBI: entry; OMA: entry
Species	Human	Mouse
Entrez	9881	320429
Ensembl	ENSG00000168016	ENSMUSG00000062296
UniProt	O15050	Q8BV79
RefSeq (mRNA)	NM_014831; NM_001329998	NM_001164659
RefSeq (protein)	NP_001316927; NP_055646	NP_001158131
Location (UCSC)	Chr 3: 36.83 – 36.95 Mb	Chr 9: 111.14 – 111.22 Mb
PubMed search
- Wikidata
View/Edit Human	View/Edit Mouse

Tetratricopeptide repeat and ankyrin repeat containing 1 is a protein that in humans is encoded by the TRANK1 gene.

== Disease Linkage ==
Through a Genome-wide association study, TRANK1 has been associated with the Bipolar disorder.
