= Zinc finger protein 804A =

Protein found in humans

ZNF804A

Identifiers
- Aliases: ZNF804A, C2orf10, zinc finger protein 804A
- External IDs: OMIM: 612282; MGI: 2442949; GeneCards: ZNF804A

Gene location (Human)
Chr.	Chromosome 2 (human)
Band	2q32.1	Start	184,598,529 bp
Band	2q32.1	End	184,939,492 bp

Gene location (Mouse)
Chr.	Chromosome 2 (mouse)
Band	2|2 D	Start	81,883,566 bp
Band	2|2 D	End	82,090,223 bp
RNA expression pattern
Bgee	Human / Mouse (ortholog); Top expressed in: ganglionic eminence; Brodmann area 10; Brodmann area 23; glomerulus; metanephric glomerulus; cerebellar vermis; middle temporal gyrus; stromal cell of endometrium; primary visual cortex; testicle / Top expressed in: lateral geniculate nucleus; medial geniculate nucleus; supraoptic nucleus; medial dorsal nucleus; lateral septal nucleus; lumbar spinal ganglion; olfactory tubercle; nucleus accumbens; anterior amygdaloid area; subiculum; More reference expression data
BioGPS	n/a
Gene ontology
Molecular function	metal ion binding; nucleic acid binding; molecular function
Cellular component	nucleus; cytoplasm; plasma membrane; axon; growth cone; soma; dendritic spine; dendritic shaft; presynapse; postsynapse; dendritic microtubule
Biological process	positive regulation of gene expression; regulation of neuron projection development; positive regulation of neuron projection development; positive regulation of dendritic spine maintenance
Sources:Amigo / QuickGO
Orthologs
Databases	NCBI: entry; OMA: entry
Species	Human	Mouse
Entrez	91752	241514
Ensembl	ENSG00000170396	ENSMUSG00000070866
UniProt	Q7Z570	A2AKY4
RefSeq (mRNA)	NM_194250	NM_175513
RefSeq (protein)	NP_919226	NP_780722
Location (UCSC)	Chr 2: 184.6 – 184.94 Mb	Chr 2: 81.88 – 82.09 Mb
PubMed search
- Wikidata
View/Edit Human	View/Edit Mouse

Zinc finger protein 804A is a protein that in humans is encoded by the ZNF804A gene. The human gene maps to chromosome 2 q32.1 and consists of 4 exons that code for a protein of 1210 amino acids (137 kDa).

Little is known about the characteristics and function of the encoded protein. However, the protein sequence codes for a domain characteristic of a classical C_{2}H_{2}-type zinc finger near the N-terminal end.

== Interactions ==
ZNF804A binds to the N-terminus of ATXN1.

=== Binding of DNA ===
The tertiary structure of the C_{2}H_{2} finger consists of a beta hairpin folded against an alpha helix. The folding occurs via a zinc(II) ion that coordinates to two cysteine residues (one on each beta sheet) and two histidine residues (both on the α-helix). ZNF804A might use its zinc finger to bind DNA in a sequence-specific manner. For example, Carl Pabo and his colleagues in 1991 discovered that mouse transcription factor Zif268 binds DNA using three linked C_{2}H_{2} zinc fingers. Amino acid residues sticking out from the α-helices of the zinc fingers interact with the guanine-rich region of the DNA double helix through hydrogen bonds and electrostatic and hydrophobic interactions. The spacing of the residues matches the spacing of the base pairs. Zinc fingers fit into the major groove and wrap around the DNA helix for almost one turn.

== Association with schizophrenia ==
In humans, ZNF804A is expressed broadly throughout the brain, especially in the developing hippocampus and the cortex, as well as in the adult cerebellum. ZNF804A is expected to bind DNA and thus regulate gene expression like other zinc finger proteins. The mouse homologue of ZNF804A, zfp804a, has recently been reported as a target for HOXC8, suggesting that ZNF804A may be involved in the regulation of early neurodevelopment.

A Genome-wide association study (GWAS) has identified ZNF804A as a susceptibility gene for schizophrenia. From family, twin, and adoption studies, schizophrenia is found to have heritability of ~80% and it is suspected that risk results from multiple genetic variants of small effect. The single-nucleotide polymorphism (SNP) rs1344706 in intron 2 of ZNF804A has been identified as a variant that is most strongly associated with schizophrenia.

The same SNP has been reported to correlate with slightly disturbed functional coupling of several brain regions in healthy persons, resembling the changes described in schizophrenia. A further study revealed that the SNP rs1344706 was consistent with schizophrenia association in European patients, but not in Han Chinese patients. Moreover, the study showed that SNPs rs1021042 and rs359895 are associated with schizophrenia in Han Chinese patients, and that the rs359895 allele increases the promoter activity of ZNF804A. The results of another study suggest that there is no relationship between variant rs1344706 and impaired cognitive function in schizophrenia patients and the results of yet another study indicate that ZNF804A also plays a role in how schizophrenia symptoms respond to antipsychotics.
