= Chronic progressive external ophthalmoplegia =

- Other names: Progressive external ophthalmoplegia
- Specialty: Ophthalmology

Chronic progressive external ophthalmoplegia (CPEO) is a type of eye disorder characterized by slowly progressive inability to move the eyes and eyebrows. It is often the only feature of mitochondrial disease, in which case the term CPEO may be given as the diagnosis. In other people suffering from mitochondrial disease, CPEO occurs as part of a syndrome involving more than one part of the body, such as Kearns–Sayre syndrome. Occasionally CPEO may be caused by conditions other than mitochondrial diseases.

== Signs and symptoms ==
CPEO is a rare disease that may affect those of all ages, but typically manifests in the young adult years. CPEO is the most common manifestation of mitochondrial myopathy, occurring in an estimated two-thirds of all cases of mitochondrial myopathy. Patients typically present with ptosis (drooping eyelids). Other diseases like Graves' disease, myasthenia gravis and glioma that may cause an external ophthalmoplegia must be ruled out.

=== CPEO itself ===
CPEO is a slowly progressing disease. It may begin at any age and progresses over a period of 5–15 years. The first presenting symptom of ptosis is often unnoticed by the patient until the lids droop to the point of producing a visual field defect. Often, patients will tilt the head backwards to adjust for the slowly progressing ptosis of the lids. In addition, as the ptosis becomes complete, the patients will use the frontalis (forehead) muscle to help elevate the lids. The ptosis is typically bilateral but may be unilateral for a period of months to years before the fellow lid becomes involved.

Ophthalmoplegia (the inability or difficulty to move the eye) is usually symmetrical, therefore, patients are not affected by diplopia (double vision). The progressive ophthalmoplegia is often unnoticed till decreased ocular motility limits peripheral vision. Often someone else will point out the ocular disturbance to the patient. Patients will move their heads to adjust for the loss of peripheral vision caused by inability to abduct or adduct the eye. All directions of gaze are affected; however, downward gaze appears to be best spared. This is in contrast to progressive supranuclear palsy (PSP), which typically affects vertical gaze and spares horizontal gaze.

Mitochondrial retinopathy has been described in CPEO which presents with a spectrum of distinct retinal phenotypes. This includes mild, focal pigmentary abnormalities on funduscopy and widespread granular pigmented fundus alterations. Mild, asymptomatic retinopathy might be underreported; severe retinopathy may be associated with significant vision loss.

=== Occurring alongside CPEO ===
Weakness of extraocular muscle groups including, the orbicularis oculi muscle as well as facial and limb muscles may be present in up to 25% of patients with CPEO. As a result of the orbicularis oculi weakness, patients may suffer from exposure keratopathy (damage to cornea) from the inability to close the eyes tightly. Frontalis muscle weakness may exacerbate the ptotic lids with the inability to compensate for the ptosis. Facial muscles may be involved which lead to atrophy of facial muscle groups producing a thin, expressionless face with some having difficulty with chewing. Neck, shoulder and extremity weakness with atrophy may affect some patients and can be mild or severe.

Mild visual impairment was seen in 95% of patients that were evaluated using the Visual Function Index (VF-14).

The ciliary muscles that control the lens shape and the iris muscles are often unaffected by CPEO.

Additional symptoms are variable, and may include exercise intolerance, cataracts, hearing loss, sensory axonal neuropathy, ataxia, clinical depression, hypogonadism, and parkinsonism.

Kearns–Sayre syndrome is characterized by onset before 15 years of age of CPEO, heart block and pigmentary retinopathy.

== Genetics ==
Mitochondrial DNA which is transmitted from the mother, encodes proteins that are critical to the respiratory chain required to produce adenosine triphosphate (ATP). Deletions or mutations to segments of mtDNA lead to defective function of oxidative phosphorylation. This may be made evident in highly oxidative tissues like skeletal muscle and heart tissue. However, extraocular muscles contain a volume of mitochondria that is several times greater than any other muscle group. As such, this results in the preferential ocular symptoms of CPEO.

Multiple mtDNA abnormalities exist which cause CPEO. One mutation is located in a conserved region of mitochondrial tRNA at nucleotide 3243 in which there is an A to G nucleotide transition. This mutation is associated with both CPEO and mitochondrial encephalomyopathy, lactic acidosis, and stroke-like episodes (MELAS). A common deletion found in one-third of CPEO patients is a 4,977 base pair segment found between a 13 base pair repeat.

The mtDNA that is affected maybe a single or multiple point deletion, with associated nuclear DNA deletions. One study showed that mtDNA deletion seen in CPEO patients also had an associated nuclear DNA deletion of the Twinkle gene which encodes specific mitochondrial protein; Twinkle.

Whether a tissue is affected is correlated with the amount of oxidative demands in relation to the amount of mtDNA deletion.In most cases, PEO occurs due to a sporadic deletion or duplication within the mitochondrial DNA. However, transmission from the mother to the progeny appears only in few cases. Both autosomal dominant and autosomal recessive inheritance can occur, autosomal recessive inheritance being more severe. Dominant and recessive forms of PEO can be caused by genetic mutations in the ANT1, POLG, POLG2 and PEO1 genes.

== Diagnosis ==
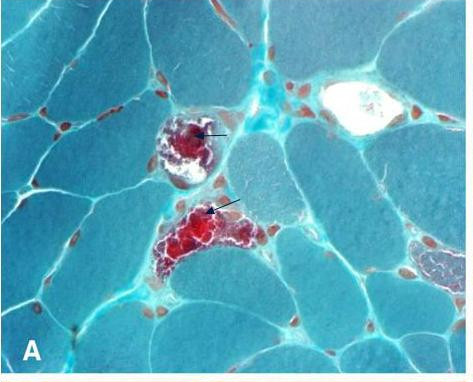
An example of ragged red fibers

It is important to differentiate CPEO from other pathologies that may cause an ophthalmoplegia. There are specific therapies used for these pathologies.

CPEO is diagnosed via muscle biopsy. On examination of muscle fibers stained with Gömöri trichrome stain, one can see an accumulation of enlarged mitochondria. This produces a dark red staining of the muscle fibers given the name "ragged red fibers". While ragged red fibers are seen in normal aging, amounts in excess of normal aging give a diagnosis of a mitochondrial myopathy. Polymerase chain reaction (PCR) from a sample of blood or muscle tissue can determine a mutation of the mtDNA.

Elevated acetylcholine receptor antibody level which is typically seen in myasthenia gravis has been seen in certain patients of mitochondrial associated ophthalmoplegia. It is important to have a dilated eye exam to determine if there is pigmentary retinopathy that may signify Kearns–Sayre syndrome which is associated with cardiac abnormalities.

MRI may be helpful in the diagnosis, in one study volumes of medial rectus, lateral rectus, and inferior rectus muscles in CPEO were not smaller than normal (in contrast to the profound atrophy typical of neurogenic paralysis). Although volumes of the superior rectus muscle-levator complex and superior oblique were significantly reduced.

== Treatment ==
There is currently no defined treatment to ameliorate the muscle weakness of CPEO. Treatments used to treat other pathologies causing ophthalmoplegia has not been shown to be effective. Experimental treatment with tetracycline has been used to improve ocular motility in one patient. Coenzyme Q_{10} has also been used to treat this condition. However, most neuro-ophthalmologists do not ascribe to any treatment.

Ptosis associated with CPEO may be corrected with surgery to raise the lids, however due to weakness of the orbicularis oculi muscles, care must be taken not to raise the lids in excess causing an inability to close the lids. This results in an exposure keratopathy. Therefore, rarely should lid surgery be performed and only by a neuro-ophthalmologist familiar with the disease.

The most common strabismus finding is large angle exotropia which can be treated by maximal bilateral eye surgery, but due to the progressive nature of the disease, strabismus may recur. Those that have diplopia as a result of asymmetric ophthalmoplegia may be corrected with prisms or with surgery to create a better alignment of the eyes.

== See also ==
- Ophthalmoparesis
