= Ophthalmoparesis =

Weakness or paralysis of extraocular muscles

- Other names: Ophthalmoplegia
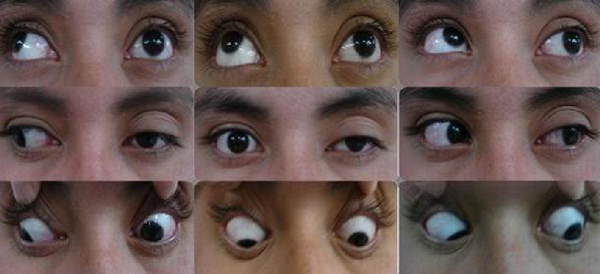
- Neuro-ophthalmologic examination showing ophthalmoplegia affecting the left eye in a patient with Tolosa–Hunt syndrome. The central image represents forward gaze, and each image around it represents gaze in that direction (for example, in the upper left image, the patient looks up and right; the left eye is unable to accomplish this movement). The examination shows ptosis of the left eyelid, exotropia (outward deviation) of the primary look of the left eye, and paresis (weakness) of the third (oculomotor), fourth (trochlear) and sixth (abducens) left cranial nerves.
- Specialty: Ophthalmology

Ophthalmoparesis refers to weakness (-paresis) or paralysis (-plegia) of one or more extraocular muscles which are responsible for eye movements. It is a physical finding in certain neurologic, ophthalmologic, and endocrine disease.

Internal ophthalmoplegia means involvement limited to the pupillary sphincter and ciliary muscle. External ophthalmoplegia refers to involvement of only the extraocular muscles. Complete ophthalmoplegia indicates involvement of both.

== Causes ==
Ophthalmoparesis can result from disorders of various parts of the eye and nervous system:

- Infection around the eye. Ophthalmoplegia is an important finding in orbital cellulitis.
- The orbit of the eye, including mechanical restrictions of eye movement, as in Graves' disease.
- The muscle, as in progressive external ophthalmoplegia or Kearns–Sayre syndrome.
- The neuromuscular junction, as in myasthenia gravis.
- The relevant cranial nerves (specifically the oculomotor, trochlear, and abducens), as in cavernous sinus syndrome or raised intracranial pressure.
- The brainstem nuclei of these nerves, as in certain patterns of brainstem stroke such as Foville's syndrome.
- White matter tracts connecting these nuclei, as in internuclear ophthalmoplegia, an occasional finding in multiple sclerosis.
- Dorsal midbrain structures, as in Parinaud's syndrome.
- Certain parts of the cerebral cortex (including the frontal eye fields), as in stroke.
- Toxic envenomation by mambas, taipans, and kraits.

Thiamine deficiency can cause ophthalmoparesis in susceptible persons; this is part of the syndrome called Wernicke encephalopathy. The causal pathway by which this occurs is unknown. Intoxication with certain substances, such as phenytoin, can also cause ophthalmoparesis.

== Diagnosis ==
=== Classification ===
Ophthalmoparesis can involve any or all of the extraocular muscles, which include the superior recti, inferior recti, medial recti, lateral recti, inferior oblique and superior oblique muscles.

It can also be classified by the directions of affected movements, e.g. "vertical ophthalmoparesis".

== Treatment ==
Treatment and prognosis depend on the underlying condition. For example, in thiamine deficiency, treatment would be the immediate administration of vitamin B1.

== See also ==
- Paresis
