= Gemcitabine =

Chemical compound

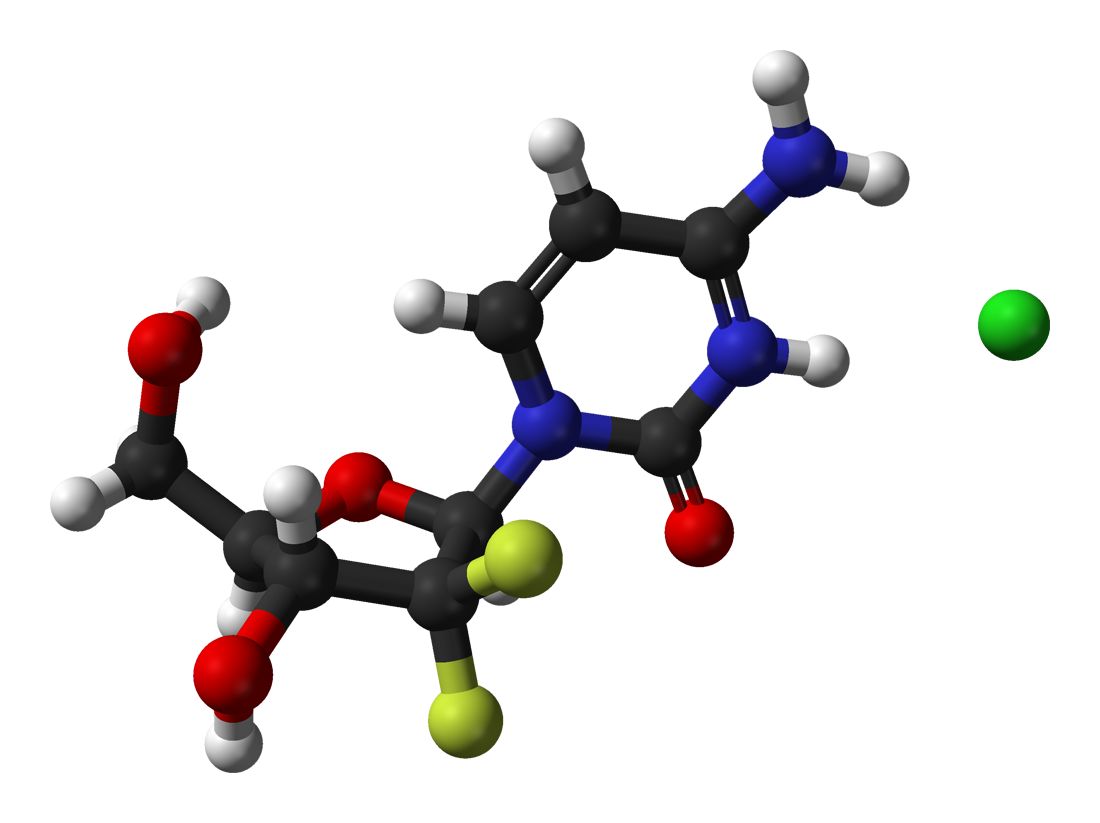

Clinical data
- Pronunciation: /dʒɛmˈsaɪtəbiːn/
- Trade names: Gemzar, others
- Other names: 2', 2'-difluoro 2'deoxycytidine, dFdC
- AHFS/Drugs.com: Monograph
- Pregnancy category: AU: D
- Routes of administration: Intravenous
- ATC code: L01BC05 (WHO)

Legal status
- Legal status: AU: S4 (Prescription only); CA: ℞-only; UK: POM (Prescription only); US: ℞-only; In general: ℞ (Prescription only)

Pharmacokinetic data
- Protein binding: <10%
- Elimination half-life: Short infusions: 32–94 minutes Long infusions: 245–638 minutes

Identifiers
- IUPAC name: 4-Amino-1-(2-deoxy-2,2-difluoro-β-D-erythro-pentofuranosyl)pyrimidin-2(1H)-on
- CAS Number: 95058-81-4
- PubChem CID: 60750
- IUPHAR/BPS: 4793
- DrugBank: DB00441
- ChemSpider: 54753
- UNII: B76N6SBZ8R
- KEGG: D02368
- ChEBI: CHEBI:175901
- ChEMBL: ChEMBL888
- CompTox Dashboard (EPA): DTXSID3040487
- ECHA InfoCard: 100.124.343

Chemical and physical data
- Formula: C_{9}H_{11}F_{2}N_{3}O_{4}
- Molar mass: 263.201 g·mol^{−1}
- 3D model (JSmol): Interactive image
- SMILES: c1cn(c(=O)nc1N)[C@H]2C([C@@H]([C@H](O2)CO)O)(F)F
- InChI: InChI=1S/C9H11F2N3O4/c10-9(11)6(16)4(3-15)18-7(9)14-2-1-5(12)13-8(14)17/h1-2,4,6-7,15-16H,3H2,(H2,12,13,17)/t4-,6-,7-/m1/s1; Key:SDUQYLNIPVEERB-QPPQHZFASA-N

Gemcitabine, sold under the brand name Gemzar, among others, is a chemotherapy medication used to treat cancers. It is used to treat testicular cancer, breast cancer, ovarian cancer, non-small cell lung cancer, pancreatic cancer, and bladder cancer. It is administered by intravenous infusion. It acts against neoplastic growth, and it inhibits the replication of Orthohepevirus A, the causative agent of hepatitis E, through upregulation of interferon signaling.

Common side effects include bone marrow suppression, liver and kidney problems, nausea, fever, rash, shortness of breath, mouth sores, diarrhea, neuropathy, and hair loss. Use during pregnancy will likely result in fetal harm. Gemcitabine is in the nucleoside analog family of medication. It works by blocking the creation of new DNA, which results in cell death.

Gemcitabine was patented in 1983 and was approved for medical use in 1995. Generic versions were introduced in Europe in 2009 and in the US in 2010. It is on the WHO Model List of Essential Medicines.

== Medical uses ==
Gemcitabine treats various carcinomas. It is used as a first-line treatment alone for pancreatic cancer, and in combination with cisplatin for advanced or metastatic bladder cancer and advanced or metastatic non-small cell lung cancer. It is used as a second-line treatment in combination with carboplatin for ovarian cancer and in combination with paclitaxel for breast cancer that is metastatic or cannot be surgically removed.

It is used off-label to treat cholangiocarcinoma and other biliary tract cancers.

== Contraindications and interactions ==
Taking gemcitabine can also affect fertility in men and women, sex life, and menstruation. Women taking gemcitabine should not become pregnant, and pregnant and breastfeeding women should not take it.

As of 2014, drug interactions had not been studied.

== Adverse effects ==
Gemcitabine is a chemotherapy drug that works by killing any cells that are dividing. Cancer cells divide rapidly and so are targeted at higher rates by gemcitabine, but many essential cells also divide rapidly, including cells in skin, the scalp, the stomach lining, and bone marrow, resulting in adverse effects.

The gemcitabine label carries warnings that it can suppress bone marrow function and cause loss of white blood cells, loss of platelets, and loss of red blood cells, and that it should be used carefully in people with liver, kidney, or cardiovascular disorders. People taking it should not take live vaccines. The warning label also states it may cause posterior reversible encephalopathy syndrome, that it may cause capillary leak syndrome, that it may cause severe lung conditions like pulmonary edema, pneumonia, and adult respiratory distress syndrome, and that it may harm sperm.

More than 10% of users develop adverse effects, including difficulty breathing, low white and red blood cells counts, low platelet counts, vomiting and nausea, elevated transaminases, rashes and itchy skin, hair loss, blood and protein in urine, flu-like symptoms, and edema.

Common adverse effects (occurring in 1–10% of users) include fever, loss of appetite, headache, difficulty sleeping, tiredness, cough, runny nose, diarrhea, mouth and lip sores, sweating, back pain, and muscle pain.

Thrombotic thrombocytopenic purpura (TTP) is a rare but serious side effect that been associated with particular chemotherapy medications including gemcitabine. TTP is a blood disorder and can lead to microangipathic hemolytic anemia (MAHA), neurologic abnormalities, fever, and renal disease.

== Pharmacology ==
Gemcitabine is hydrophilic and must be transported into cells via molecular transporters for nucleosides (the most common transporters for gemcitabine are SLC29A1, SLC28A1, and SLC28A3). After entering the cell, gemcitabine is first modified by attaching a phosphate to it, and so it becomes gemcitabine monophosphate (dFdCMP). This is the rate-determining step that is catalyzed by the enzyme deoxycytidine kinase (DCK). Two more phosphates are added by other enzymes. After the attachment of the three phosphates gemcitabine is finally pharmacologically active as gemcitabine triphosphate (dFdCTP).

After being thrice phosphorylated, gemcitabine can masquerade as deoxycytidine triphosphate and is incorporated into new DNA strands being synthesized as the cell replicates.

When gemcitabine is incorporated into DNA it allows a native, or normal, nucleoside base to be added next to it. This leads to "masked chain termination" because gemcitabine is a "faulty" base, but due to its neighboring native nucleoside it eludes the cell's normal repair system (base-excision repair). Thus, incorporation of gemcitabine into the cell's DNA creates an irreparable error that leads to inhibition of further DNA synthesis, and thereby leading to cell death.

The form of gemcitabine with two phosphates attached (dFdCDP) also has activity; it inhibits the enzyme ribonucleotide reductase (RNR), which is needed to create new DNA nucleotides. The lack of nucleotides drives the cell to uptake more of the components it needs to make nucleotides from outside the cell, which also increases uptake of gemcitabine.

== Chemistry ==
Gemcitabine is a synthetic pyrimidine nucleoside prodrug—a nucleoside analog in which the hydrogen atoms on the 2' carbon of deoxycytidine are replaced by fluorine atoms.

The synthesis described and pictured below is the original synthesis done in the Eli Lilly Company labs. Synthesis begins with enantiopure D-glyceraldehyde (R)-2 as the starting material which can made from D-mannitol in 2–7 steps. Then fluorine is introduced by a "building block" approach using ethyl bromodifluoroacetate. Then, Reformatsky reaction under standard conditions will yield a 3:1 anti/syn diastereomeric mixture, with one major product. Separation of the diastereomers is carried out via HPLC, thus yielding the anti-3 gemcitabine in a 65% yield. At least two other full synthesis methods have also been developed by different groups.

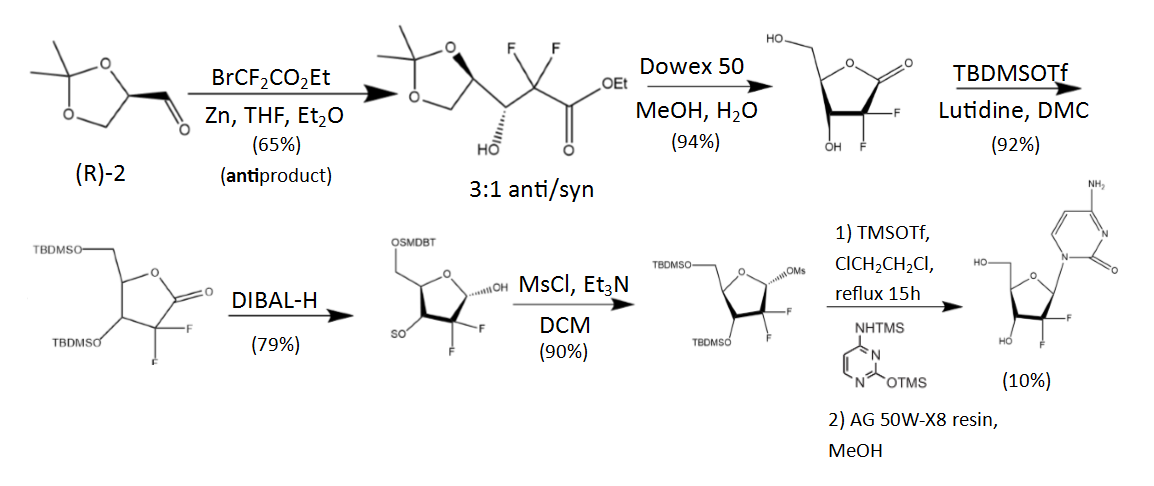
Illustration of the original synthesis process used and published by Hertel et al. in 1988 of Lilly laboratories

== History ==
Gemcitabine was first synthesized in Larry Hertel's lab at Eli Lilly and Company during the early 1980s. It was intended as an antiviral drug, but preclinical testing showed that it killed leukemia cells in vitro.

During the early 1990s gemcitabine was studied in clinical trials. The pancreatic cancer trials found that gemcitabine increased one-year survival rate significantly, and it was approved in the UK in 1995 and approved by the FDA in 1996 for pancreatic cancers. In 1998, gemcitabine received FDA approval for treating non-small cell lung cancer and in 2004, it was approved for metastatic breast cancer.

European labels were harmonized by the EMA in 2008.

By 2008, Lilly's worldwide sales of gemcitabine were about $1.7 billion; at that time its US patents were set to expire in 2013 and its European patents in 2009. The first generic launched in Europe in 2009, and patent challenges were mounted in the US which led to invalidation of a key Lilly patent on its method to make the drug. Generic companies started selling the drug in the US in 2010 when the patent on the chemical itself expired. Patent litigation in China made headlines there and was resolved in 2010.

== Society and culture ==
As of 2017, gemcitabine was marketed under many brand names worldwide: Abine, Accogem, Acytabin, Antoril, axigem, Bendacitabin, Biogem, Boligem, Celzar, Citegin, Cytigem, Cytogem, Daplax, DBL, Demozar, Dercin, Emcitab, Enekamub, Eriogem, Fotinex, Gebina, Gemalata, Gembin, Gembine, Gembio, Gemcel, Gemcetin, Gemcibine, Gemcikal, Gemcipen, Gemcired, Gemcirena, Gemcit, Gemcitabin, Gemcitabina, Gemcitabine, Gemcitabinum, Gemcitan, Gemedac, Gemflor, Gemful, Gemita, Gemko, Gemliquid, Gemmis, Gemnil, Gempower, Gemsol, Gemstad, Gemstada, Gemtabine, Gemtavis, Gemtaz, Gemtero, Gemtra, Gemtro, Gemvic, Gemxit, Gemzar, Gentabim, Genuten, Genvir, Geroam, Gestredos, Getanosan, Getmisi, Gezt, Gitrabin, Gramagen, Haxanit, Jemta, Kalbezar, Medigem, Meditabine, Nabigem, Nallian, Oncogem, Oncoril, Pamigeno, Ribozar, Santabin, Sitagem, Symtabin, Yu Jie, Ze Fei, and Zefei.

== Research ==
Because it is clinically valuable and is only useful when delivered intravenously or intravesically, methods to reformulate it so that it can be given by mouth have been a subject of research.

Research into pharmacogenomics and pharmacogenetics has been ongoing. As of 2014, it was not clear whether or not genetic tests could be useful in guiding dosing and which people respond best to gemcitabine. However, it appears that variation in the expression of proteins (SLC29A1, SLC29A2, SLC28A1, and SLC28A3) used for transport of gemcitabine into the cell lead to variations in its potency. Similarly, the genes that express proteins that lead to its inactivation (deoxycytidine deaminase, cytidine deaminase, and NT5C) and that express its other intracellular targets (RRM1, RRM2, and RRM2B) lead to variations in response to the drug. Research has also been ongoing to understand how mutations in pancreatic cancers themselves determine response to gemcitabine.

It has been studied as a treatment for Kaposi's sarcoma, a common cancer in people with AIDS which is uncommon in the developed world but not uncommon in the developing world.
