= ATP cone domain =

ATP-cone
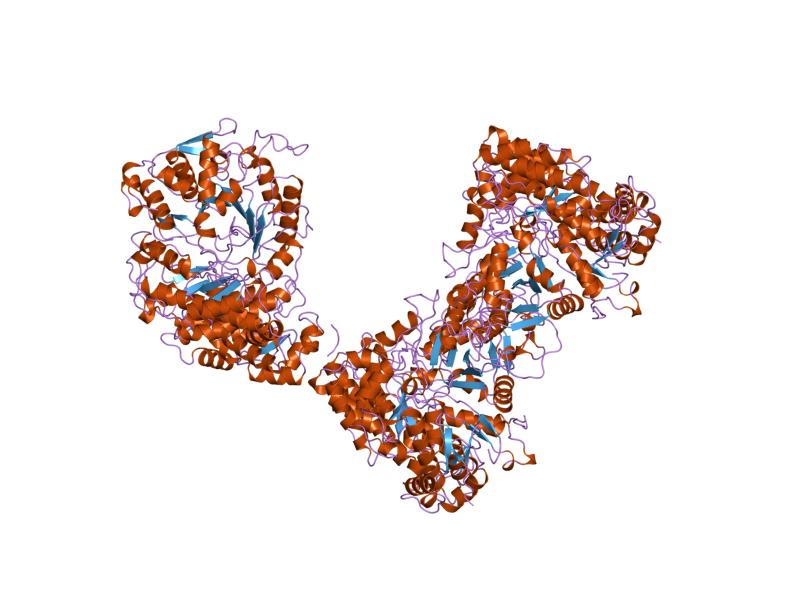
- ribonucleotide reductase e441q mutant r1 protein from escherichia coli

Identifiers
- Symbol: ATP-cone
- Pfam: PF03477
- InterPro: IPR005144
- SCOP2: 7r1r / SCOPe / SUPFAM
Available protein structures:
- PDB: IPR005144 PF03477 (ECOD; PDBsum)
- AlphaFold: IPR005144; PF03477

In molecular biology, the ATP-cone is an evolutionarily mobile, ATP-binding regulatory domain which is found in a variety of proteins including ribonucleotide reductases, phosphoglycerate kinases and transcriptional regulators.

In ribonucleotide reductase protein R1 from Escherichia coli this domain is located at the N terminus, and is composed mostly of helices. It forms part of the allosteric effector region and contains the general allosteric activity site in a cleft located at the tip of the N-terminal region. This site binds either ATP (activating) or dATP (inhibitory), with the base bound in a hydrophobic pocket and the phosphates bound to basic residues. Substrate binding to this site is thought to affect enzyme activity by altering the relative positions of the two subunits of ribonucleotide reductase.

The ATP-cone domain also is a key part of NrdR, that controls transcription of ribonucleotide reductases in bacteria, in response to ATP and dATP levels.
