= NrdJ RNA motif =

nrdJ
- Consensus secondary structure and sequence conservation of nrdJ RNA

Identifiers
- Symbol: nrdJ
- Rfam: RF03034

Other data
- RNA type: Gene; sRNA
- SO: SO:0001263
- PDB structures: PDBe

The nrdJ RNA motif is a conserved RNA structure that was discovered by bioinformatics. The nrdJ motif is found in the genus Streptomyces.

nrdJ RNAs occur upstream of nrdJ genes, which encode class II ribonucleotide reductase. The RNAs therefore likely function as cis-regulatory elements, but this is uncertain because of some cases in which the downstream gene is located very far away.
