= RRM2 =

Protein-coding gene in humans

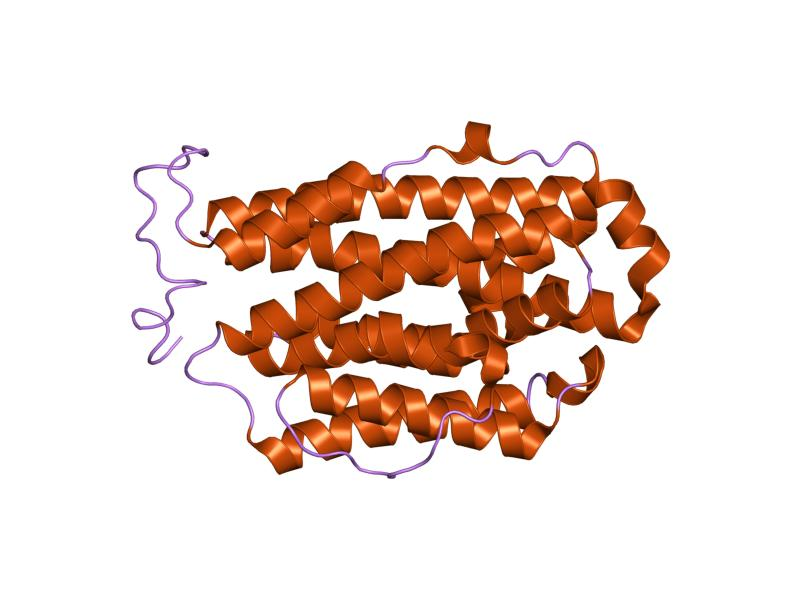

Identifiers
- Aliases: RRM2, R2, RR2, RR2M, ribonucleotide reductase regulatory subunit M2
- External IDs: OMIM: 180390; MGI: 98181; GeneCards: RRM2
Available structures
PDB	Ortholog search: PDBe RCSB
PDB	List of PDB id codes 2UW2, 3OLJ, 3VPM, 3VPN, 3VPO
Enzyme activity
EC #	BRENDA	ExPASy	KEGG	MetaCyc
1.17.4.1	↗	↗	↗	↗

Gene location (Human)
Chr.	Chromosome 2 (human)
Band	2p25.1	Start	10,120,698 bp
Band	2p25.1	End	10,211,725 bp

Gene location (Mouse)
Chr.	Chromosome 12 (mouse)
Band	12 A1.3|12 8.5 cM	Start	24,758,240 bp
Band	12 A1.3|12 8.5 cM	End	24,764,145 bp
RNA expression pattern
Bgee	Human / Mouse (ortholog); Top expressed in: secondary oocyte; ventricular zone; ganglionic eminence; trabecular bone; thymus; bone marrow; bone marrow cell; amniotic fluid; gingival epithelium; appendix / Top expressed in: gastrula; decidua; fetal liver hematopoietic progenitor cell; somite; primitive streak; medial ganglionic eminence; tibiofemoral joint; abdominal wall; renal corpuscle; endothelial cell of lymphatic vessel; More reference expression data
BioGPS	n/a
Gene ontology
Molecular function	metal ion binding; protein binding; oxidoreductase activity; ribonucleoside-diphosphate reductase activity, thioredoxin disulfide as acceptor; ferric iron binding; protein homodimerization activity
Cellular component	cytoplasm; cytosol; ribonucleoside-diphosphate reductase complex
Biological process	regulation of transcription involved in G1/S transition of mitotic cell cycle; deoxyribonucleotide biosynthetic process; DNA replication; negative regulation of G0 to G1 transition; deoxyribonucleotide metabolic process; protein complex oligomerization; protein heterotetramerization; nucleobase-containing small molecule interconversion
Sources:Amigo / QuickGO
Orthologs
Databases	NCBI: entry; OMA: entry
Species	Human	Mouse
Entrez	6241	20135
Ensembl	ENSG00000171848	ENSMUSG00000020649
UniProt	P31350	P11157
RefSeq (mRNA)	NM_001165931; NM_001034	NM_009104
RefSeq (protein)	NP_001025; NP_001159403	NP_033130
Location (UCSC)	Chr 2: 10.12 – 10.21 Mb	Chr 12: 24.76 – 24.76 Mb
PubMed search
- Wikidata
View/Edit Human	View/Edit Mouse

Ribonucleoside-diphosphate reductase subunit M2, also known as ribonucleotide reductase small subunit, is an enzyme that in humans is encoded by the RRM2 gene.

== Function ==
This gene encodes one of two non-identical subunits for ribonucleotide reductase. This reductase catalyzes the formation of deoxyribonucleotides from ribonucleotides. Synthesis of the encoded protein (M2) is regulated in a cell-cycle dependent fashion. Transcription from this gene can initiate from alternative promoters, which results in two isoforms that differ in the lengths of their N-termini.

== Interactive pathway map ==
Click on genes, proteins and metabolites below to link to respective articles. (Note: The interactive pathway map can be edited at WikiPathways: "FluoropyrimidineActivity_WP1601".)

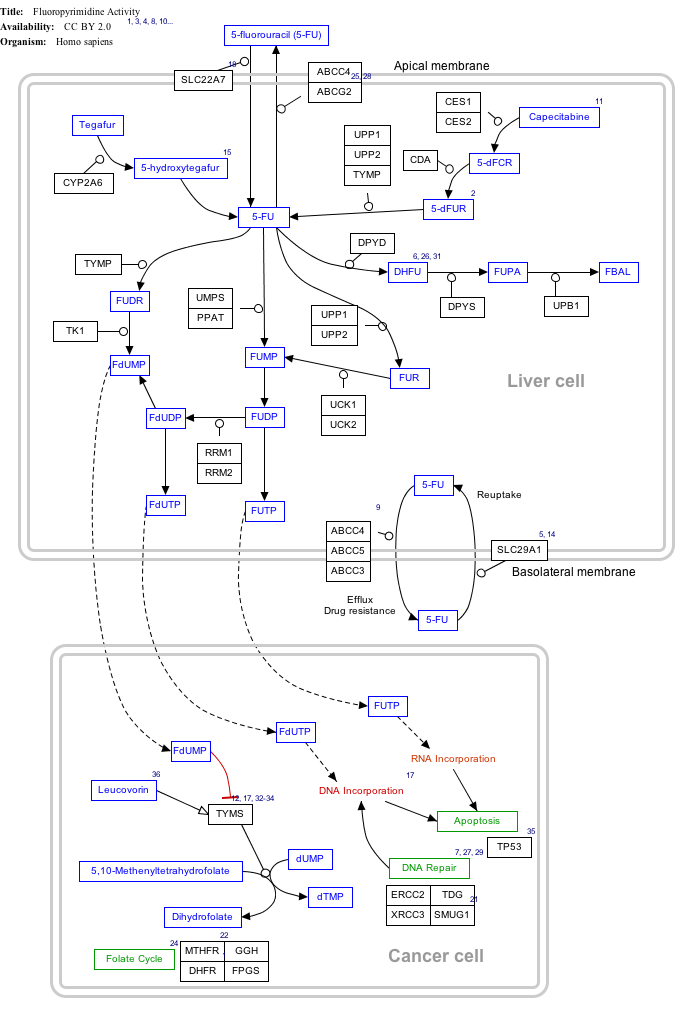

Fluorouracil (5-FU) Activity edit
