= RRM1 =

Protein-coding gene in humans

Available structures
PDB	Ortholog search: PDBe RCSB
PDB	List of PDB id codes 2WGH, 3HNC, 3HND, 3HNE, 3HNF, 5D1Y, 4X3V

Identifiers
- Aliases: RRM1, R1, RIR1, RR1, ribonucleotide reductase catalytic subunit M1
- External IDs: OMIM: 180410; MGI: 98180; HomoloGene: 806; GeneCards: RRM1; OMA:RRM1 - orthologs

Gene location (Human)
Chr.	Chromosome 11 (human)
Band	11p15.4	Start	4,094,707 bp
Band	11p15.4	End	4,138,932 bp

Gene location (Mouse)
Chr.	Chromosome 7 (mouse)
Band	7 E3|7 54.72 cM	Start	102,090,902 bp
Band	7 E3|7 54.72 cM	End	102,118,978 bp
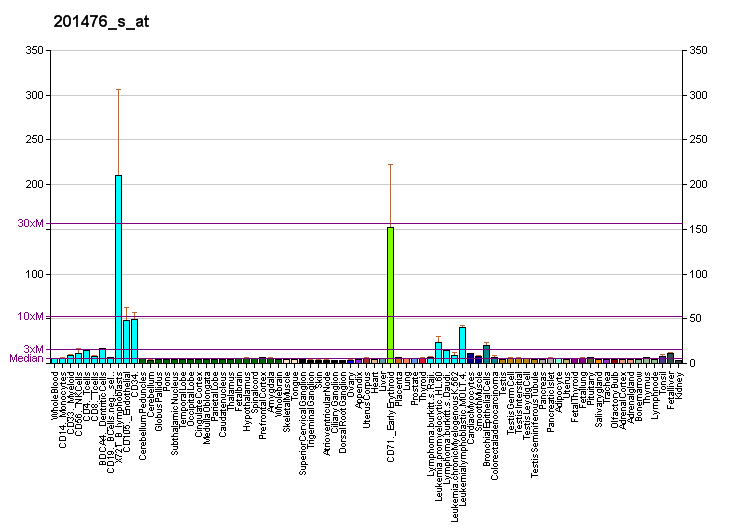

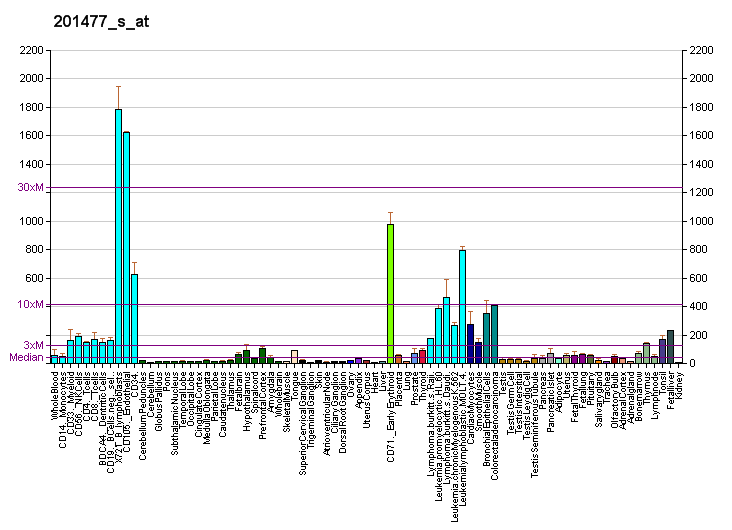
RNA expression pattern
Bgee	Human / Mouse (ortholog); Top expressed in: ventricular zone; ganglionic eminence; human penis; nipple; trabecular bone; skin of hip; skin of thigh; mucosa of pharynx; vulva; Achilles tendon / Top expressed in: fetal liver hematopoietic progenitor cell; maxillary prominence; gastrula; mandibular prominence; ventricular zone; primitive streak; spermatocyte; tibiofemoral joint; endothelial cell of lymphatic vessel; decidua; More reference expression data
BioGPS	More reference expression data
Gene ontology
Molecular function	nucleotide binding; catalytic activity; oxidoreductase activity; ATP binding; protein binding; ribonucleoside-diphosphate reductase activity, thioredoxin disulfide as acceptor; identical protein binding; purine nucleotide binding; disordered domain specific binding
Cellular component	cytoplasm; cytosol; nuclear envelope; ribonucleoside-diphosphate reductase complex; cell projection; soma
Biological process	DNA replication; metabolism; mitotic cell cycle; pyrimidine nucleobase metabolic process; male gonad development; deoxyribonucleotide biosynthetic process; response to ionizing radiation; cell proliferation in forebrain; protein complex oligomerization; protein heterotetramerization; retina development in camera-type eye; nucleobase-containing small molecule interconversion
Sources:Amigo / QuickGO
Orthologs
Species	Human	Mouse
Entrez	6240	20133
Ensembl	ENSG00000167325	ENSMUSG00000030978
UniProt	P23921	P07742
RefSeq (mRNA)	NM_001033; NM_001318064; NM_001318065; NM_001330193	NM_009103
RefSeq (protein)	NP_001024; NP_001304993; NP_001304994; NP_001317122	NP_033129
Location (UCSC)	Chr 11: 4.09 – 4.14 Mb	Chr 7: 102.09 – 102.12 Mb
PubMed search
- Wikidata
View/Edit Human	View/Edit Mouse

Ribonucleoside-diphosphate reductase large subunit is an enzyme that in humans is encoded by the RRM1 gene.

This gene encodes one of two non-identical subunits which constitute ribonucleoside-diphosphate reductase, an enzyme essential for the production of deoxyribonucleotides prior to DNA synthesis in S phase of dividing cells. It is one of several genes located in the imprinted gene domain of 11p15.5, an important tumor-suppressor gene region. Alterations in this region have been associated with the Beckwith-Wiedemann syndrome, Wilms tumor, rhabdomyosarcoma, adrenocortical carcinoma, and lung, ovarian, and breast cancer. This gene may play a role in malignancies and disease that involve this region. This gene is oriented in a head-to-tail configuration with the stromal interaction molecule 1 gene (STIM1), with the 3' end of STIM1 situated 1.6 kb from the 5' end of this gene.

== Interactive pathway map ==
Click on genes, proteins and metabolites below to link to respective articles. (Note: The interactive pathway map can be edited at WikiPathways: "FluoropyrimidineActivity_WP1601".)

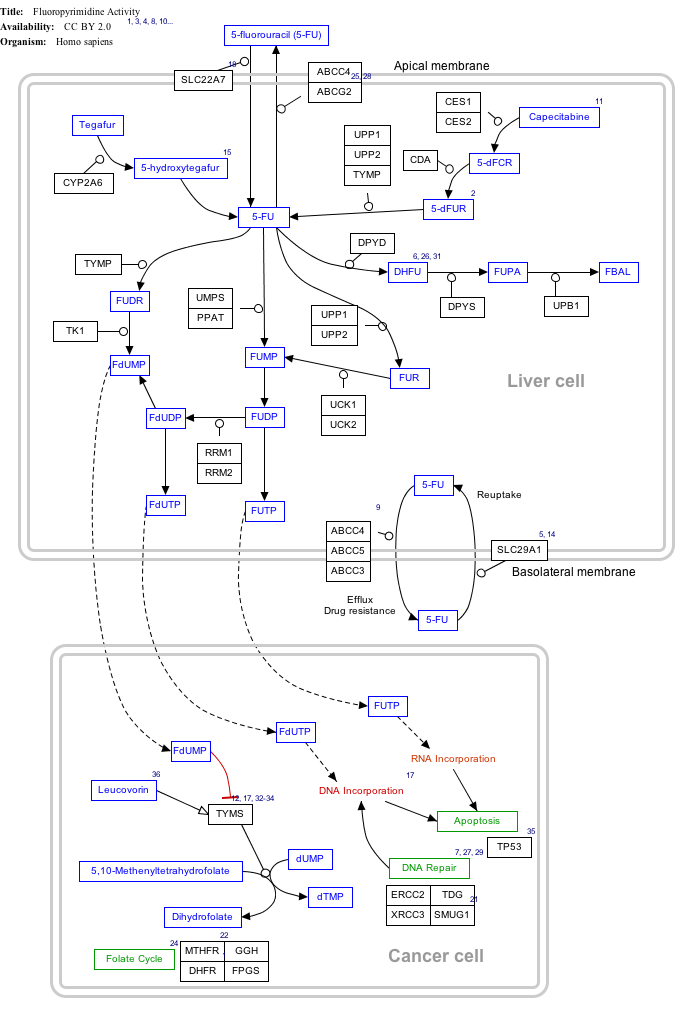

Fluorouracil (5-FU) Activity edit

== See also ==
- Ribonucleotide reductase
