= Deoxycytidine deaminase =

deoxycytidine deaminase

Identifiers
- EC no.: 3.5.4.14

Databases
- BRENDA: enzyme data
- ExPASy: NiceZyme view
- KEGG: enzyme entry
- MetaCyc: metabolic pathway
- Rhea: reactions
- PDB structures: RCSB PDB PDBe PDBsum
- Gene Ontology: AmiGO / QuickGO
Search
- PMC: articles
- PubMed: articles
- NCBI: proteins

In enzymology, a deoxycytidine deaminase is an enzyme that catalyzes the chemical reaction

deoxycytidine + H_{2}O $\rightleftharpoons$ deoxyuridine + NH_{3}

This type of activity is now thought to be equivalent to EC 3.5.4.5 (cytidine deaminase), and is no longer considered a separate enzyme class in major databases.

The two substrates of this enzyme are deoxycytidine and H_{2}O, whereas its two products are deoxyuridine and NH_{3}.

This enzyme belongs to the family of hydrolases, those acting on carbon-nitrogen bonds other than peptide bonds, specifically in cyclic amidines. The systematic name of this enzyme class is cytidine/2'-deoxycytidine aminohydrolase. This enzyme participates in pyrimidine metabolism. As every deoxycytidine deaminase is also a cytidine deaminase, they share the same EC number. The recommended name assigned by the IUBMB is cytidine deaminase.
