= Ribonucleotide reductase =

Class of enzymes

ribonucleoside-diphosphate reductase
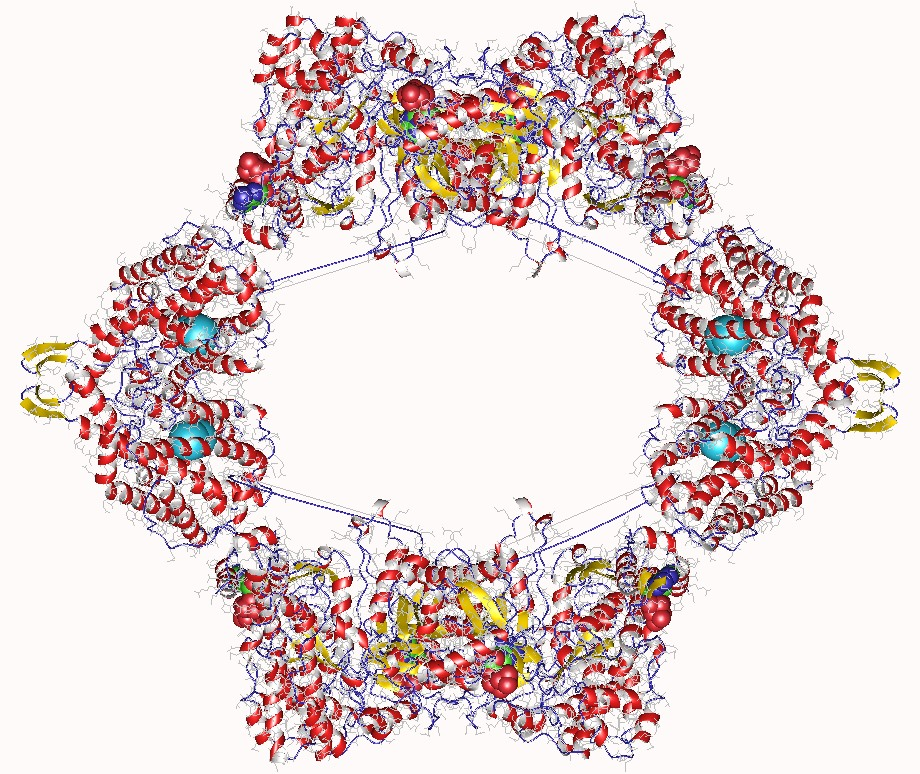
- Ribonucleoside-diphosphate reductase heterooctamer, E.Coli

Identifiers
- EC no.: 1.17.4.1
- CAS no.: 9047-64-7sy

Databases
- BRENDA: enzyme data
- ExPASy: NiceZyme view
- KEGG: enzyme entry
- MetaCyc: metabolic pathway
- Rhea: reactions
- PDB structures: RCSB PDB PDBe PDBsum
- Gene Ontology: AmiGO / QuickGO
Search
- PMC: articles
- PubMed: articles
- NCBI: proteins

Ribonucleotide reductase (RNR), also known as ribonucleoside diphosphate reductase, is an enzyme that catalyzes the formation of deoxyribonucleotides from ribonucleotides. It catalyzes this formation by removing the 2'-hydroxyl group of the ribose ring of nucleoside diphosphates (or triphosphates depending on the class of RNR). This reduction produces deoxyribonucleotides. Deoxyribonucleotides in turn are used in the synthesis of DNA. The reaction catalyzed by RNR is strictly conserved in all living organisms. Furthermore, RNR plays a critical role in regulating the total rate of DNA synthesis so that DNA to cell mass is maintained at a constant ratio during cell division and DNA repair. A somewhat unusual feature of the RNR enzyme is that it catalyzes a reaction that proceeds via a free radical mechanism of action. The substrates for RNR are ADP, GDP, CDP and UDP. dTDP (deoxythymidine diphosphate) is synthesized by another enzyme (thymidylate kinase) from dTMP (deoxythymidine monophosphate).

== Structure ==
Ribonucleotide reductases are divided into three classes. Class I RNR enzymes are constructed from large alpha subunit and small beta subunits which associate to form an active heterodimeric tetramer. By reducing NDPs to 2'-dNDPs, the enzyme catalyses the de novo synthesis of deoxyribonucleotides (dNTPs), which are precursors to DNA synthesis and essential for cell proliferation. Class II RNRs produce a 5'-deoxyadenosyl radical by homolytic cleavage of the C-Co bond in adenosylcobalamin. In addition, Class III RNRs contain a stable glycyl radical.

Humans carry Class I RNRs. The alpha subunit is encoded by the RRM1 gene while there are two isoforms of the beta subunit, encoded by the RRM2 and RRM2B genes:

ribonucleotide reductase M1 polypeptide

Identifiers
- Symbol: RRM1
- NCBI gene: 6240
- HGNC: 10451
- OMIM: 180410
- RefSeq: NM_001033
- UniProt: P23921

Other data
- EC number: 1.17.4.1
- Locus: Chr. 11 p15.5–15.4
Search for
- Structures: Swiss-model
- Domains: InterPro

ribonucleotide reductase M2 polypeptide

Identifiers
- Symbol: RRM2
- NCBI gene: 6241
- HGNC: 10452
- OMIM: 180390
- RefSeq: NM_001034
- UniProt: P31350

Other data
- EC number: 1.17.4.1
- Locus: Chr. 2 p25-p24
Search for
- Structures: Swiss-model
- Domains: InterPro

ribonucleotide reductase M2 B (TP53 inducible)

Identifiers
- Symbol: RRM2B
- NCBI gene: 50484
- HGNC: 17296
- OMIM: 604712
- RefSeq: NM_015713
- UniProt: Q9NTD8

Other data
- EC number: EC:1.17.4.1
- Locus: Chr. 8 q23.1
Search for
- Structures: Swiss-model
- Domains: InterPro

Each Class I alpha monomer consists of three domains:

- one mainly helical domain comprising the 220 N-terminal residues,
- a second large ten-stranded α/β structure comprising 480 residues,
- and a third small five-stranded α/β structure comprising 70 residues.

In Pfam, the second domain has been interpreted as two separate domains:

- a shorter all-alpha N-terminal domain,
- and a longer barrel C-terminal domain.

Ribonucleotide reductase N-terminal
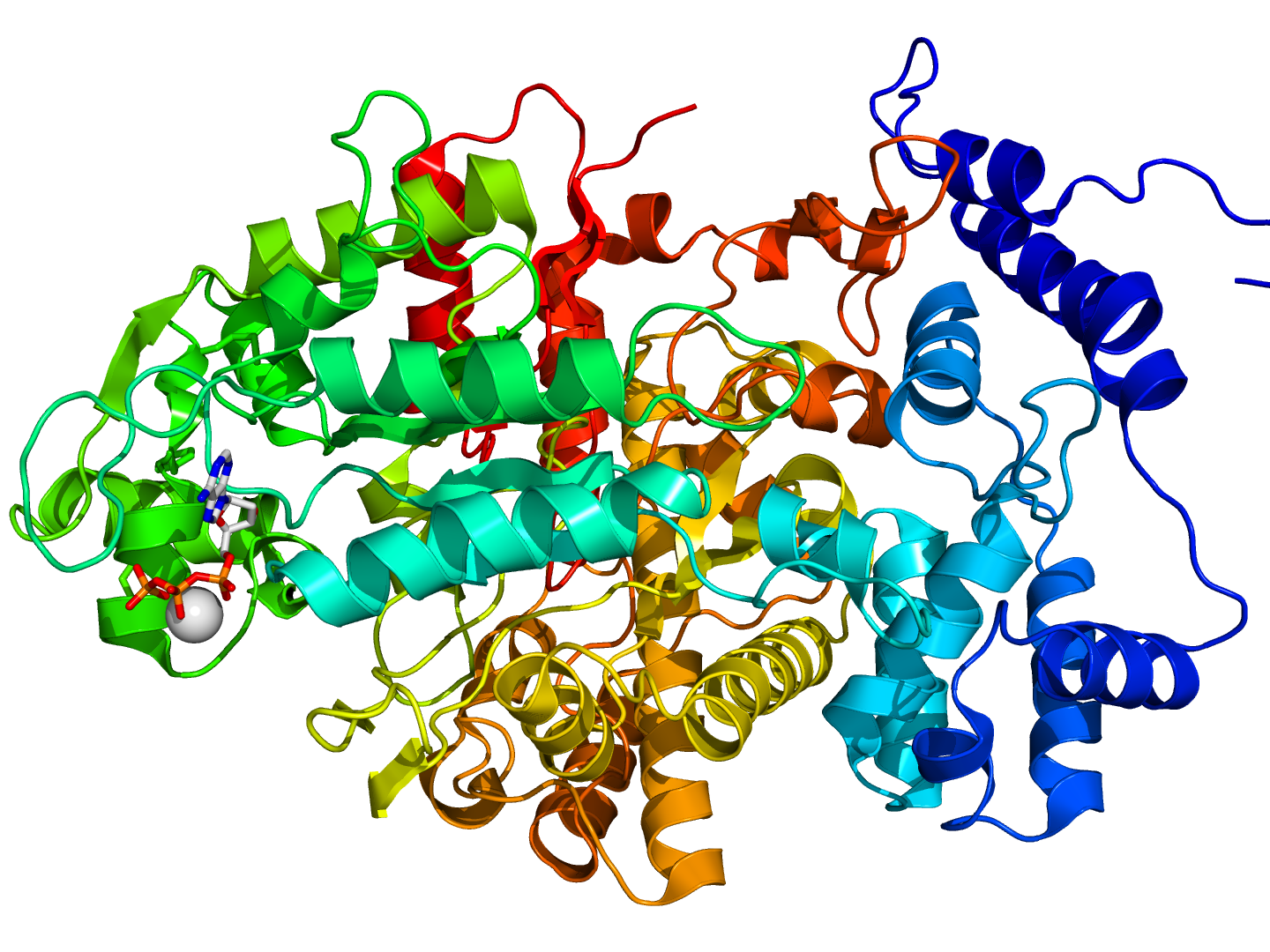
- Crystallographic structure of the ribonucleotide reductase protein R1E from S. typhimurium. The protein is rainbow colored (N-terminus = blue, C-terminus = red) while dATP is depicted as sticks and a complexed magnesium ion as a grey sphere.

Identifiers
- Symbol: RR_N
- Pfam: PF08343
- InterPro: IPR013554
- SCOP2: 1peq / SCOPe / SUPFAM
Available protein structures:
- PDB: 1pem, 1peo, 1peq, 1peu, 2bq1 IPR013554 PF08343 (ECOD; PDBsum)
- AlphaFold: IPR013554; PF08343

Ribonucleotide reductase all-alpha domain
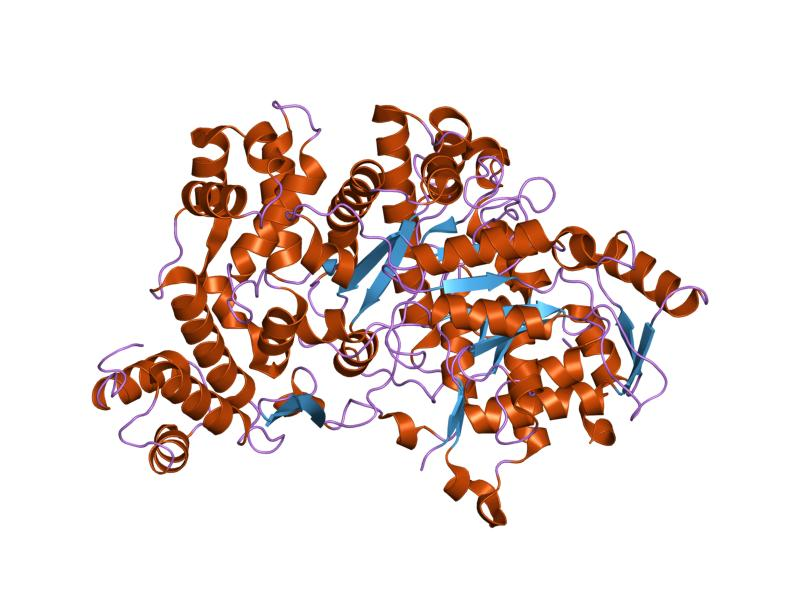
- Structure of ribonucleotide reductase protein R1 (Class I alpha subunit).

Identifiers
- Symbol: Ribonuc_red_lgN
- Pfam: PF00317
- InterPro: IPR013509
- PROSITE: PDOC00084
- SCOP2: 1rlr / SCOPe / SUPFAM
Available protein structures:
- PDB: 1pem, 1peo, 1peq, 1peu, 1r1r, 2r1r, 3r1r, 4r1r, 5r1r, 6r1r, 7r1r IPR013509 PF00317 (ECOD; PDBsum)
- AlphaFold: IPR013509; PF00317

Ribonucleotide reductase barrel domain
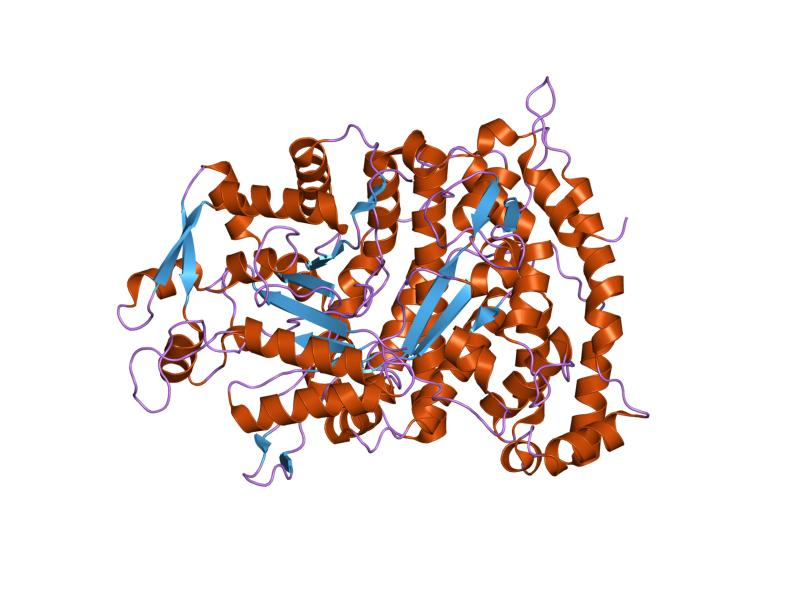
- Structure of ribonucleotide reductase protein R1E from Salmonella typhimurium.

Identifiers
- Symbol: Ribonuc_red_lgC
- Pfam: PF02867
- Pfam clan: CL0339
- InterPro: IPR000788
- PROSITE: PDOC00084
- SCOP2: 1rlr / SCOPe / SUPFAM
Available protein structures:
- PDB: 1pem, 1peo, 1peq, 1peu, 1r1r, 2r1r, 3r1r, 4r1r, 5r1r, 6r1r, 7r1r IPR000788 PF02867 (ECOD; PDBsum)
- AlphaFold: IPR000788; PF02867

Ribonucleotide reductase small chain
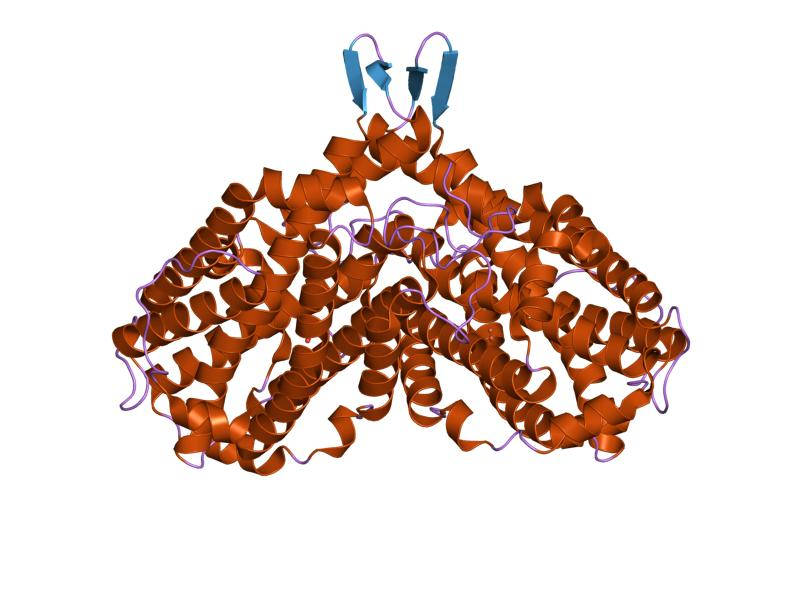
- Structure of the Escherichia coli ribonucleotide reductase protein R2.

Identifiers
- Symbol: Ribonuc_red_sm
- Pfam: PF00268
- Pfam clan: CL0044
- InterPro: IPR000358
- PROSITE: PDOC00317
- SCOP2: 1rib / SCOPe / SUPFAM
Available protein structures:
- PDB: 1av8, 1biq, 1h0n, 1h0o, 1jk0, 1jpr, 1jqc, 1kgn, 1kgo, 1kgp, 1mrr, 1mxr, 1oqu, 1pfr, 1pim, 1piu, 1piy, 1piz, 1pj0, 1pj1, 1pm2, 1r2f, 1r65, 1rib, 1rnr, 1rsr, 1rsv, 1smq, 1sms, 1syy, 1uzr, 1w68, 1w69, 1xik, 1xsm, 1yfd, 2alx, 2av8, 2bq1, 2r2f IPR000358 PF00268 (ECOD; PDBsum)
- AlphaFold: IPR000358; PF00268

The Class I beta subunit usually contains a di-metal center and a stable tyrosyl radical. In humans, the beta subunit relies on a di-iron cofactor. In E. coli, the tyrosyl radical is located at position 122 (Y122) providing the stable radical for the Class I RNR2 subunits. In A. aegypti, this tyrosyl radical is located at position 184 (Y184). The tyrosyl radical is deeply buried inside the protein in a hydrophobic environment, located close to the iron center that is used in the stabilization of a tyrosyl radical. The structure of two μ-oxo-linked irons is dominated by ligands that serve as iron binding sites: four carboxylates [aspartate (D146), glutamate (E177, E240, and E274)] and two histidines (H180 and H277). Association occurs between the C-terminus of RNR2 and the C-terminus of RNR1. Enzymatic activity is dependent on association of the RNR1 and RNR2 subunits. The active site consists of the active dithiol groups from the RNR1 as well as the diferric center and the tyrosyl radical from the RNR2 subunit.

Other residues of RNR2, such as aspartate (D273), tryptophan (W48), and tyrosine (Y356) further stabilize the active-site tyrosyl radical thus allowing electron transfer. These residues help in the transfer of the radical electron from tyrosine (Y122) of RNR2 to cysteine (C439) of RNR1. The electron transfer begins on RNR2 tyrosine (Y122) and continues in RNR2 to tryptophan (W48), which is separated from RNR1 tyrosine (Y731) by 2.5 nanometers. Electron transfer from RNR2 to RNR1 occurs via tyrosine (Y356 to Y731) and continues on through tyrosine (Y730) to cysteine (C439) in the active site. Site-directed mutations of the RNR primary structure indicate that all residues cited above participate in the long distance transfer of the free radical to the active site.

In A. aegypti mosquitoes, RNR1 retains most of the crucial amino acid residues, including aspartate (D64) and valine (V292 or V284), that are necessary in allosteric regulation; proline (P210 and P610), leucine (L453 and L473), and methionine (M603) residues that are located in the hydrophobic active site; cysteine (C225, C436 and C451) residues that are involved in removal of a hydrogen atom and transfer of the radical electron at the active site; cysteine (C225 and C436), asparagine (N434), and glutamate (E441) residues that bind the ribonucleotide substrate; tyrosine (Y723 and Y743) residues that dictate the radical transfer; and cysteine (C838 and C841) residues that are used in the regeneration of dithiol groups in the active site.

The yeast Saccharomyces cerevisiae possesses a minor isoform of large subunit of ribonucleotide-diphosphate reductase under the designation RNR3 or YIL066C on the yeast chromosome IX. It is a paralog of the yeast RNR1, which likely arose from a whole genome duplication event. The RNR complex catalyzes the rate-limiting step in dNTP synthesis, regulated by DNA replication and DNA damage checkpoint pathways via localization of small subunits.

== Function ==
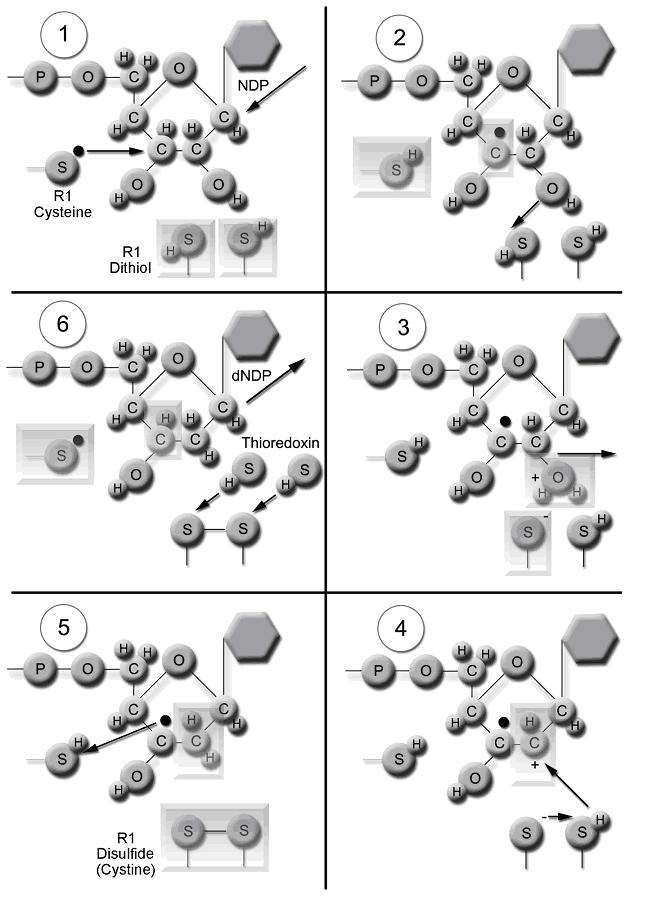
Mechanism to catalyze the conversion of ribonucleotides to deoxyribonucleotides. (adapted from Nelson & Cox, 2000). (1) an electron transfer on the RNR2 subunit activates a RNR1 cysteine residue in the active site with a free radical; (2) the free radical forms a stable radical on C-3, and cysteine radical removes a hydrogen atom; (3) cation is formed on C-2 by transferring a hydrogen from a dithiol group and is stabilized by the radical, resulting in the loss of H2O from C-2; (4) a hydrogen is transferred from the dithiol group to reduce the cation C-2; (5) the C-3 radical is reduced by the hydrogen removed in step 2, and the tyrosyl radical is generated; (6) redoxins transfer two hydrogen to the disulfide group that restores the original configuration.

The enzyme ribonucleotide reductase (RNR) catalyzes the synthesis of dNDPs. A free radical abstracts a hydrogen from a C-H bond of the ribose. Following a single reduction, RNR requires electrons donated from the dithiol groups of the protein thioredoxin or thioredoxin like proteins eg NrdH. Regeneration of thioredoxin occurs when nicotinamide adenine dinucleotide phosphate (NADPH) provides two hydrogen atoms that are used to reduce the disulfide groups of thioredoxin.

Three classes of RNR have similar mechanisms for the reduction of NDPs, but differ in the domain that generates the free radical, the specific metal in the metalloprotein structure, and the electron donors. All classes use free-radicals. Class I reductases use an iron center with ferrous to ferric conversion to generate a tyrosyl radical. Reduction of NDP substrates occurs under aerobic conditions. Class I reductases are divided into IA and IB due to differences in regulation. Class IA reductases are distributed in eukaryotes, eubacteria, bacteriophages, and viruses. Class IB reductases are found in eubacteria. Class IB reductases can also use a radical generated with the stabilization of a binuclear manganese center. Additionally Class IB gets its electrons from a thioredoxin like protein known as NrdH. Class II reductases generate the free radical 5'-deoxyadenosyl radical from cobalamin (coenzyme B12) and have a simpler structure than classes I and III reductases. Reduction of NDPs or ribonucleotide 5'-triphosphates (NTPs) occurs under either aerobic or anaerobic conditions. Class II reductases are distributed in archaebacteria, eubacteria, and bacteriophages. Class III reductases use a glycine radical generated with the help of an S-adenosyl methionine and an iron sulphur center. Reduction of NTPs is limited to anaerobic conditions. Class III reductases are distributed in archaebacteria, eubacteria, and bacteriophages. Organisms are not limited to having one class of enzymes. For example, E. coli have both class I and class III RNR.

== Catalytic mechanism ==
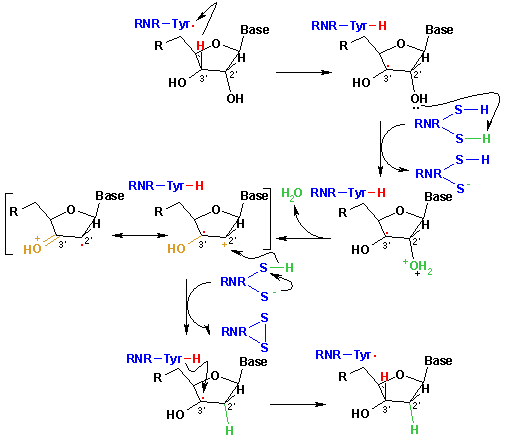
The reaction mechanism of RNR.

The mechanism that is currently accepted for the reduction of ribonucleotides to deoxyribonucleotides is depicted in the following scheme. The first step involves the abstraction of the 3'- H of substrate 1 by radical Cys439. Subsequently, the reaction involves the elimination of one water molecule from carbon C-2' of the ribonucleotide, catalyzed by Cys225 and Glu441. In the third step there is a hydrogen atom transfer from Cys225 to carbon C-2' of the 2'-ketyl radical 3, after previous proton transfer from Cys462 to Cys225. At the end of this step, a radical anionic disulfide bridge and the closed-shell ketone intermediate 4 are obtained. This intermediate has been identified during the conversion of several 2'-substituted substrate analogues, as well as with the natural substrate interacting with enzyme mutants. The next step is the oxidation of the anionic disulfide bridge, with concomitant reduction of the substrate, generating 5. The spin density shifts from the sulphur atoms to the C-3' atom of the substrate, with simultaneous proton transfer from Glu441 to carbon C-3'. The last step is the reverse of the first step and involves a hydrogen transfer from Cys439 to C-3', regenerating the initial radical and resulting in the final product 6.

Theoretical models of some steps of these mechanisms using the full model of the R1 protein can be found at the studies performed by Cerqueira et al..

== Regulation ==
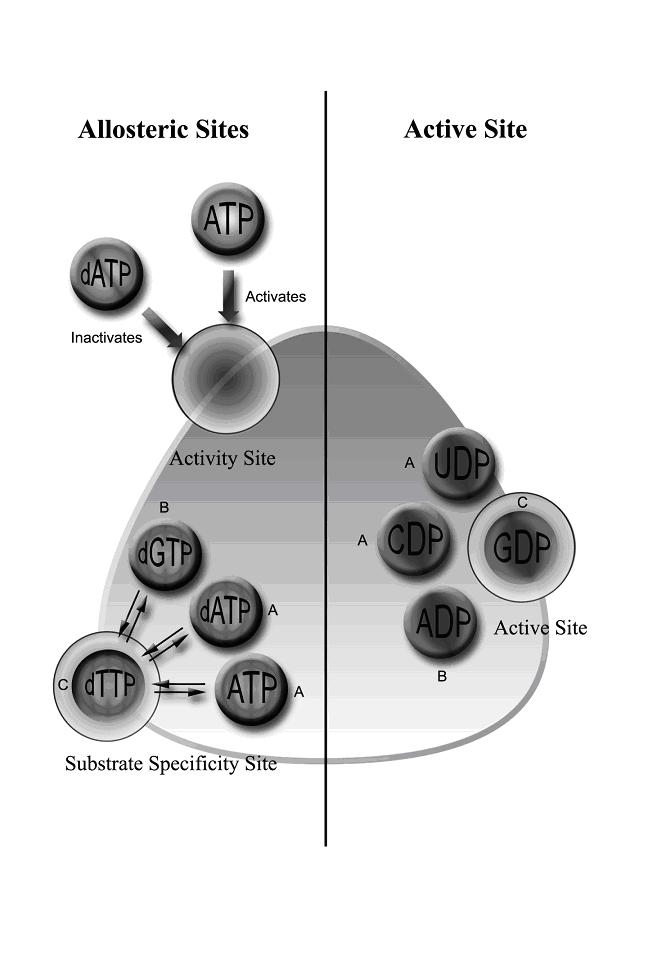
Regulation of class I RNR. Class I RNRs are activated by binding ATP or inactivated by binding dATP to the activity site located on the RNR1 subunit. When the enzyme is activated, substrates are reduced if the corresponding effectors bind to the allosteric substrate specificity site. A = when dATP or ATP is bound at the allosteric site, the enzyme accepts UDP and CDP into the catalytic site; B = when dGTP is bound, ADP enters the catalytic site; C = when dTTP is bound, GDP enters the catalytic site. The substrates (ribonucleotides UDP, CDP, ADP, and GDP) are converted to dNTPs by a mechanism involving the generation of a free radical.

Class I RNR comprises RNR1 and RNR2 subunits, which can associate to form a heterodimeric tetramer. RNR1 contains both allosteric sites, mediating regulation of substrate specificity and activity. Depending on the allosteric configuration, one of the four ribonucleotides binds to the active site.

Regulation of RNR is designed to maintain balanced quantities of dNTPs. Binding of effector molecules either increases or decreases RNR activity. When ATP binds to the allosteric activity site, it activates RNR. In contrast, when dATP binds to this site, it deactivates RNR. In addition to controlling activity, the allosteric mechanism also regulates the substrate specificity and ensures the enzyme produces an equal amount of each dNTP for DNA synthesis. In all classes, binding of ATP or dATP to the allosteric site induces reduction of cytidine 5'-diphosphate (CDP) and uridine 5'-diphosphate (UDP); 2'-deoxyguanosine 5'-triphosphate (dGTP) induces reduction of adenosine 5'-diphosphate (ADP); and 2'-deoxythymidine 5'-triphosphate (dTTP) induces reduction of guanosine 5'-diphosphate (GDP) (Figure 1).

Class IB reductases are not inhibited by dATP because they lack approximately 50 N-terminal amino acids required for the allosteric activity site. Additionally, it is important that the activity of ribonucleotide reductase be under transcriptional and post-transcriptional control because the synthesis of damage-free DNA relies on a balanced pool of deoxyribonucleotides. Eukaryotic cells with class IA reductases have a mechanism of negative control to turn off synthesis of dNTPs as they accumulate. This mechanism protects the cell from toxic and mutagenic effects that can arise from the overproduction of dNTPs because changes in balanced dNTP pools lead to DNA damage and cell death. Although, the overproduction of dNTPs or an unbalanced supply of them can lead to misincorporation of nucleotides into DNA, the supply of dNTPs supply can allow for DNA repair. p53R2 is a small subunit of ribonucleotide reductase that can induce such repair. Changes within this p53 induced R2 homolog can cause depletion in mitochondrial DNA and consequently p53R2 serves a major factor in dNTP supply.

RNR may use the morpheein model of allosteric regulation.

== Clinical significance ==
=== Cancer ===
Ribonucleotide reductase (RNR) is a key enzyme responsible for the de novo synthesis of deoxyribonucleotides, which are essential for DNA replication and repair in all living cells. Its clinical significance arises from its central role in cell proliferation and genomic integrity making it a critical factor in cancer biology. In oncology, RNR activity is frequently elevated in malignant cells, where it supports rapid DNA synthesis and tumor growth. Overexpression of specific RNR subunits, such as RRM2, has been correlated with poor prognosis, increased chemoresistance, and unfavorable outcomes in various cancers, including pancreatic cancer and chronic lymphocytic leukemia. The prognostic value of RNR expression, particularly the RRM1 subunit, has been explored as both a biomarker and a potential target for targeted therapies.

Therapeutically, RNR is an established target for anticancer drugs—agents such as gemcitabine and hydroxyurea exert their effects by inhibiting RNR, thereby disrupting DNA synthesis and compromising cancer cell viability. Novel inhibitors and strategies aiming at RNR and its subunits continue to be investigated to overcome drug resistance and enhance cancer treatment outcomes. Furthermore, the enzyme's crucial function in maintaining the balance of deoxyribonucleotide pools positions it as a target not only for cancer therapy but also for antimicrobial and antiviral drug development, given its essentiality in prokaryotes and some viruses. If you can stop RNR, you can halt cancer progression. Therefore, this enzyme is considered a classical target for cancer therapeutics.

=== Inhibitors ===
Generally Class I RNR inhibitors can be divided in three main groups: translation inhibitors, which block the synthesis of the enzyme; dimerization inhibitors that prevent the association of the two RNR subunits (R1 and R2); and catalytic inhibitors that inactivate the subunit R1 and/or subunit R2.

Class I RNR can be inhibited by peptides similar to the C-terminus of RNR2. These peptides can compete with RNR2 for binding to RNR1, and as a result RNR1 does not form an enzymatically active complex with RNR2. Although the C-terminus of RNR2 proteins is different across species, RNR2 can interact with RNR1 across species. When the mouse RNR2 C-terminus was replaced with the E. coli RNR2 C-terminal (7 or 33) amino acid residues, the chimeric RNR2 subunit still binds to mouse RNR1 subunits. However, they lack enzymatic activity due probably to the elimination of residues involved in the transfer of the free radical electron from the RNR2 to the RNR1 subunit.

Small peptides can specifically inhibit the RNR2 subunits from binding with RNR1 when they share a significant similarity with the normal RNR2 C-terminus. This inhibition RNR2 binding to RNR1 has been tested successfully in herpes simplex virus (HSV) RNR. When a 7 amino acid oligomer (GAVVNDL) truncated from the C-terminus of the RNR2 subunit was used in competition assays, it prevented the normal RNR2 from forming an enzymatically active complex with RNR1. Other small peptide inhibitors similar to the RNR2 C-terminus have also been used successfully to inhibit HSV RNR enzymatic activity and thus HSV replication. In mice models of stromal keratitis and corneal neovascularization (HSV ocular disease), a small RNR2 C-terminal analog BILD 1263 has been reported to inhibit RNR and is effective in preventing these diseases. In some cases, although treatment with small C-terminal analogs may not stop disease spreading, they can still help in healing. In the acyclovir-resistant HSV (PAAr5), a small peptide inhibitor BILD 1633 has been reported to be 5 to 10 times more potent than BILD 1263 against cutaneous PAAr5 infection. A combination therapy approach (BILD 1633 and acyclovir) is more effective to heal topical lesions in mice. These data suggest that small peptide inhibitors that compete with RNR2 for binding to RNR1 are useful in preventing the spread of HSV.

Gallium inhibits RNR2 by substituting for Fe^{3+} in the active site. Gallium maltolate is an orally bioavailable form of gallium that exploits this inhibitory activity to treat cancer, infections, and other diseases.

The drugs hydroxyurea and Motexafin gadolinium interfere with the action of this enzyme.
