= FOXRED1 =

Protein-coding gene in the species Homo sapiens

Identifiers
- Aliases: FOXRED1, H17, FP634, FAD-dependent oxidoreductase domain containing 1, FAD dependent oxidoreductase domain containing 1, MC1DN19
- External IDs: OMIM: 613622; MGI: 2446262; HomoloGene: 9712; GeneCards: FOXRED1; OMA:FOXRED1 - orthologs

Gene location (Human)
Chr.	Chromosome 11 (human)
Band	11q24.2	Start	126,269,024 bp
Band	11q24.2	End	126,278,131 bp

Gene location (Mouse)
Chr.	Chromosome 9 (mouse)
Band	9 A4|9	Start	35,115,502 bp
Band	9 A4|9	End	35,122,351 bp
RNA expression pattern
Bgee	Human / Mouse (ortholog); Top expressed in: right hemisphere of cerebellum; right frontal lobe; Brodmann area 9; right lobe of liver; cingulate gyrus; anterior cingulate cortex; apex of heart; prefrontal cortex; C1 segment; hypothalamus / Top expressed in: spermatocyte; brown adipose tissue; right kidney; proximal tubule; interventricular septum; ectoderm; myocardium of ventricle; otic vesicle; otic placode; saccule; More reference expression data
BioGPS	n/a
Gene ontology
Molecular function	oxidoreductase activity
Cellular component	respirasome; membrane; integral component of membrane; mitochondrial inner membrane; mitochondrion; mitochondrial respiratory chain complex I; cytoplasm
Biological process	mitochondrial respiratory chain complex I assembly
Sources:Amigo / QuickGO
Orthologs
Species	Human	Mouse
Entrez	55572	235169
Ensembl	ENSG00000110074	ENSMUSG00000039048
UniProt	Q96CU9	Q3TQB2
RefSeq (mRNA)	NM_017547	NM_001291448; NM_001291449; NM_172291; NM_001359815
RefSeq (protein)	NP_060017	NP_001278377; NP_001278378; NP_758495; NP_001346744
Location (UCSC)	Chr 11: 126.27 – 126.28 Mb	Chr 9: 35.12 – 35.12 Mb
PubMed search
- Wikidata
View/Edit Human	View/Edit Mouse

FAD-dependent oxidoreductase domain-containing protein 1 (FOXRED1), also known as H17, or FP634 is an enzyme that in humans is encoded by the FOXRED1 gene. FOXRED1 is an oxidoreductase and complex I-specific molecular chaperone involved in the assembly and stabilization of NADH dehydrogenase (ubiquinone) also known as complex I, which is located in the mitochondrial inner membrane and is the largest of the five complexes of the electron transport chain. Mutations in FOXRED1 have been associated with Leigh syndrome and infantile-onset mitochondrial encephalopathy.

== Structure ==
FOXRED1 is located on the q arm of chromosome 11 in position 14.2 and has 12 exons. The FOXRED1 gene produces a 53.8 kDa protein composed of 486 amino acids. Alternatively spliced transcript variants have been observed for this gene.

FOXRED1 contains an oxidoreductase FAD-binding domain and is homologous to FAD-binding proteins dimethylglycine dehydrogenase, sarcosine dehydrogenase, L-pipecolic acid oxidase, peroxisomal sarcosine oxidase, and pyruvate dehydrogenase regulatory subunit. FOXRED1's structural similarities to sarcosine oxidase (MSOX) predict that tyrosine residues Y410 and Y411 make up the site of covalent attachment of FAD. Additionally, a phenyl moiety at p. 359 is thought to be critical for function. Finally, FOXRED1 is a matrix-directed protein that is thought to be imported through the presence of a mitochondrial membrane potential rather than through a cleavable targeting signal. However, others suggest that it contains a 23 amino acid N-terminal mitochondrial localization sequence and that this sequence is cleaved upon entry to form the mature protein.

== Function ==
The FOXRED1 gene encodes an enzyme that is localized in the mitochondria and which helps in the assembly and stabilization of NADH:ubiquinone oxidoreductase, a large multi-subunit enzyme in the mitochondrial respiratory chain. NADH:ubiquinone oxidoreductase (complex I) is involved in several physiological activities in the cell, including metabolite transport and ATP synthesis. Complex I catalyzes the transfer of electrons from NADH to ubiquinone (coenzyme Q) in the first step of the mitochondrial respiratory chain, resulting in the translocation of protons across the inner mitochondrial membrane. The encoded protein of FOXRED1 is an oxidoreductase and complex I-specific molecular chaperone. It plays a role in the mid-to-late stages of complex I intermediate assembly and is important for the assembly, stabilization, and function of complex I. It is proposed that FOXRED1 functions in a complex with core subunit NDUFS3 as well as accessory subunits NDUFA5, NDUFA10, NDUFB10 and NDUFS5.

== Clinical Significance ==
Mutations in FOXRED1 can result in mitochondrial deficiencies and associated disorders. A disorder of the mitochondrial respiratory chain can cause a wide range of clinical manifestations from lethal neonatal disease to adult-onset neurodegenerative disorders. Phenotypes include macrocephaly with progressive leukodystrophy, non-specific encephalopathy, cardiomyopathy, myopathy, liver disease, Leigh syndrome, Leber hereditary optic neuropathy, and some forms of Parkinson disease. Pathogenic mutations of FOXRED1 have included c.1054C>T; p.R352W, c.694C>T; p.Q232X, and c.1289A>G; p.N430S. Symptoms due to these mutations have included lactic acidosis, hypertrophic cardiomyopathy, and optic atrophy. Clinically, these variants have been associated with Leigh syndrome and infantile-onset mitochondrial encephalopathy. Survival with FOXRED1 mutations appears to be more common than in other complex I deficiencies and overexpression of mutant forms can lead to rescued complex I activity indicating that FOXRED1 activity can be compensated for to some degree.

== Interactions ==
FOXRED1 co-immunoprecipitates with complex I subunits NDUFB10, NDUFS5, NDUFA10, NDUFA8, NDUFS3 and NDUFA5 and may be associated with import machinery Tom20, Tom22 and MPP as well as chaperones mtHsp70, Hsp60, and Hsp10. In addition to co-complexes and potential associations, FOXRED1 has been confirmed to have protein-protein interactions with EXOSC10.
