= DMAC2 =

Human protein involved in mitochondrial complex I assembly

Identifiers
- Aliases: DMAC2, ATP5SL, ATP5S like, distal membrane arm assembly complex 2, distal membrane arm assembly component 2
- External IDs: OMIM: 617262; MGI: 1913599; GeneCards: DMAC2

Gene location (Human)
| Chr. | Chromosome 19 (human) |
| Band | 19q13.2 | Start | 41,431,318 bp |
| Band | 19q13.2 | End | 41,440,717 bp |

Gene location (Mouse)
| Chr. | Chromosome 7 (mouse) |
| Band | 7|7 A3 | Start | 25,318,839 bp |
| Band | 7|7 A3 | End | 25,324,976 bp |
RNA expression pattern
| Bgee | Human / Mouse (ortholog); Top expressed in: apex of heart; left ventricle; jejunal mucosa; parotid gland; right auricle of heart; myocardium of left ventricle; right ventricle; duodenum; thoracic diaphragm; muscle of thigh / Top expressed in: neural layer of retina; interventricular septum; right kidney; muscle of thigh; superior frontal gyrus; primary visual cortex; spermatocyte; cerebellar cortex; epiblast; skeletal muscle tissue; More reference expression data |
| BioGPS | n/a |
Gene ontology
| Molecular function | ubiquitin-protein transferase activity |
| Cellular component | mitochondrion; mitochondrial respiratory chain complex I; SCF ubiquitin ligase complex |
| Biological process | mitochondrial respiratory chain complex I assembly; ubiquitin-dependent protein catabolic process; protein ubiquitination; SCF-dependent proteasomal ubiquitin-dependent protein catabolic process |
Sources:Amigo / QuickGO
Orthologs
| Databases | NCBI: entry; OMA: entry |
| Species | Human | Mouse |
| Entrez | 55101 | 66349 |
| Ensembl | ENSG00000105341 | ENSMUSG00000057229 |
| UniProt | Q9NW81 | Q9D7K5 |
| RefSeq (mRNA) | NM_001167867; NM_001167868; NM_001167869; NM_001167870; NM_001167871 NM_018035; NM_001320838; NM_001320839; NM_001320840; NM_001320841; NM_001320844 | NM_001290487; NM_025504 |
| RefSeq (protein) | NP_001161339; NP_001161340; NP_001161341; NP_001161342; NP_001161343 NP_001307767; NP_001307768; NP_001307769; NP_001307770; NP_001307773; NP_060505 | NP_001277416; NP_079780 |
| Location (UCSC) | Chr 19: 41.43 – 41.44 Mb | Chr 7: 25.32 – 25.32 Mb |
| PubMed search |
- Wikidata
| View/Edit Human | View/Edit Mouse |

Distal membrane-arm assembly complex protein 2 (DMAC2) is a mitochondrial protein encoded in humans by the DMAC2 gene, formerly ATP5SL. It is an assembly factor for mitochondrial respiratory chain complex I (NADH:ubiquinone oxidoreductase) rather than a component of the finished enzyme: it is required to build the distal end of the complex I membrane arm, but is not retained in the mature complex.

== Gene ==
DMAC2 sits on the minus strand of chromosome 19 at 19q13.2. NCBI places it between positions 41,431,318 and 41,439,912 of the GRCh38 assembly and annotates seven exons. Ensembl-based resources extend the 3' end of the gene further, to position 41,440,717.

HGNC approves the symbol DMAC2 and the name "distal membrane arm assembly component 2", and lists ATP5SL as a previous symbol. RefSeq describes several alternatively spliced coding and non-coding transcripts, and Ensembl annotates twelve protein-coding transcripts.

=== Expression ===
DMAC2 transcripts are found across human tissues rather than confined to a few.

== Protein ==
The protein is imported into mitochondria.

UniProt treats a 257-residue sequence, Q9NW81, as canonical, with a calculated mass of 29,267 Da (about 29.3 kDa). UniProt assigns the protein to the ATP synthase subunit s family, which is where the earlier symbol ATP5SL ("ATP5S-like") came from. The human ATP5S gene itself now carries the symbol DMAC2L.

RefSeq and UniProt number the isoforms differently, so accessions from the two databases do not map one to one. The longest RefSeq protein, isoform 1 (NP_001161339.1), is 263 residues; the 257-residue UniProt canonical sequence corresponds instead to NP_060505.2, the product of NM_018035.

== Function ==
Complex I is the entry point for electrons into the mitochondrial electron transport chain. It takes electrons from NADH, passes them to ubiquinone, and uses the energy released to pump protons across the inner mitochondrial membrane.

The enzyme is not built in one piece. Subunits encoded in the nucleus and in mitochondrial DNA are preassembled into separate modules, which are then joined. DMAC2 acts on the distal portion of the membrane arm.

It has been found on a near-complete ND4 module together with two other assembly factors, FOXRED1 and TMEM70. All three contact subunits of that module, and losing any of them, whether in cultured knockout cells or in patient material, leaves partly built membrane-arm intermediates behind instead of finished complex I. What DMAC2 does mechanically at this step is not known.

DMAC1 (TMEM261) carries a parallel name but works at a different step, being required for assembly of the ND5 module.

== Research history ==
The gene drew attention before anyone knew what it did. In 2013, Andrews and colleagues suppressed the accessory subunit NDUFA11, which left partly assembled complex I subcomplexes behind, and identified the proteins associated with them. ATP5SL appeared alongside C3orf1 and DNAJC11.

Suppressing ATP5SL, DNAJC11, or both together had no measurable effect on complex I assembly in that study, and the authors ruled out both proteins as assembly factors.

A later study reached the opposite conclusion. In 2016, Stroud and colleagues built gene-edited knockout lines for the complex I accessory subunits and measured what the loss of each one did to the mitochondrial proteome. ATP5SL and DMAC1 were identified as factors required for assembly of the distal portion of the membrane arm, and knockout cells lacking ATP5SL were characterized directly. The gene was subsequently renamed DMAC2.

Later work has kept DMAC2 among the assembly factors tied to the ND4-containing distal membrane-arm module.

== Clinical significance ==
FOXRED1 and TMEM70, the two assembly factors found alongside DMAC2 on the ND4 module, are established mitochondrial disease genes. DMAC2 is not. As of a 2020 review of assembly defects in oxidative phosphorylation, no patients carrying pathogenic DMAC2 variants had been reported.

== See also ==
- Respiratory complex I
- Oxidative phosphorylation
- Electron transport chain
- DMAC1
- FOXRED1
- TMEM70
