= TMEM70 =

Protein-coding gene in the species Homo sapiens

Identifiers
- Aliases: TMEM70, MC5DN2, transmembrane protein 70
- External IDs: OMIM: 612418; MGI: 1915068; HomoloGene: 9890; GeneCards: TMEM70; OMA:TMEM70 - orthologs

Gene location (Human)
Chr.	Chromosome 8 (human)
Band	8q21.11	Start	73,972,437 bp
Band	8q21.11	End	73,982,783 bp

Gene location (Mouse)
Chr.	Chromosome 1 (mouse)
Band	1|1 A3	Start	16,735,431 bp
Band	1|1 A3	End	16,748,499 bp
RNA expression pattern
Bgee	Human / Mouse (ortholog); Top expressed in: vastus lateralis muscle; glutes; deltoid muscle; biceps brachii; Skeletal muscle tissue of biceps brachii; thoracic diaphragm; right ventricle; Skeletal muscle tissue of rectus abdominis; triceps brachii muscle; body of tongue / Top expressed in: intercostal muscle; sternocleidomastoid muscle; digastric muscle; temporal muscle; vastus lateralis muscle; triceps brachii muscle; myocardium of ventricle; brown adipose tissue; right ventricle; seminal vesicula; More reference expression data
BioGPS	n/a
Gene ontology
Molecular function	molecular function
Cellular component	integral component of membrane; mitochondrial inner membrane; integral component of mitochondrial membrane; membrane; mitochondrion; nucleoplasm
Biological process	mitochondrial proton-transporting ATP synthase complex assembly
Sources:Amigo / QuickGO
Orthologs
Species	Human	Mouse
Entrez	54968	70397
Ensembl	ENSG00000175606	ENSMUSG00000025940
UniProt	Q9BUB7	Q921N7
RefSeq (mRNA)	NM_001040613; NM_017866	NM_026392; NM_027415
RefSeq (protein)	NP_001035703; NP_060336	NP_080668; NP_081691
Location (UCSC)	Chr 8: 73.97 – 73.98 Mb	Chr 1: 16.74 – 16.75 Mb
PubMed search
- Wikidata
View/Edit Human	View/Edit Mouse

Transmembrane protein 70 is a protein that in humans is encoded by the TMEM70 gene. It is a transmembrane protein located in the mitochondrial inner membrane involved in the assembly of the F1 and Fo structural subunits of ATP synthase. Mutations in this gene have been associated with neonatal mitochondrial encephalo-cardiomyopathy due to ATP synthase (Complex V) deficiency, causing a wide variety of symptoms including 3-methylglutaconic aciduria, lactic acidosis, mitochondrial myopathy, and cardiomyopathy.

== Structure ==
The TMEM70 gene has 4 exons and is located on the q arm of chromosome 8 in position 21.11 and spans 6,642 base pairs. The gene produces a 29 kDa protein composed of 260 amino acids. The encoded protein is a multi-pass transmembrane protein localized to the mitochondrial inner membrane. It contains two putative transmembrane regions and the conserved domain DUF1301.

== Function ==
The encoded protein is involved in the assembly of the F1 and Fo structural subunits of ATP synthase.

== Clinical significance ==
Mutations in the TMEM70 gene have been associated with neonatal mitochondrial encephalocardiomyopathy due to nuclear type 2 Complex V (ATP synthase) deficiency. There are a wide variety of possible symptoms depending on the mutation, including 3-methylglutaconic aciduria, dysmorphic features, psychomotor retardation, hypotonia, growth retardation, mitochondrial myopathy and cardiomyopathy, hepatomegaly, hypoplastic kidneys, and elevated lactate levels in urine, plasma, and cerebrospinal fluid.

Most notably, a c.317-2A→G mutation in the splice site of intron 2 of this gene caused aberrant splicing and the loss of the TMEM70 transcript. This resulted in ATP synthase deficiency symptomized by apneoic spells, hypertrophic cardiomyopathy, profound lactic acidosis, hyperammonaemia, psychomotor retardation, 3-methylglutaconic aciduria, failure to thrive, and severe muscular hypotonia. Also noted in some patients were hypospadias, intrauterine growth retardation, microcephaly and cryptorchidism, but most patients did not survive the neonatal period.

Another mutation (c.366A>T) in the second exon of this gene caused an amino acid substitution (Y112X), resulting in Nuclear Type 2 Mitochondrial Complex V deficiency symptomized by lactic acidosis, psychomotor retardation, facial dysmorphism, hypertrophic cardiomyopathy, and hypospadia.

A study of mitochondrial morphology in patients with mutations in this gene revealed disorganization of the mitochondrial nucleoid. Mitochondria were abnormal, with whorled cristae and disrupted nucleoid clusters of mtDNA. The nucleoids and mitochondrial respiratory chain complexes were confined to the outer rings of the whorls.

== Interactions ==
The encoded protein has protein-protein interactions with RAB2A, PHC2, NDUFAF8, NDUFS5, COX6B1, ECSIT, NDUFAF4, and COA3.
