= NDUFAF3 =

Protein-coding gene in the species Homo sapiens

Identifiers
- Aliases: NDUFAF3, 2P1, C3orf60, E3-3, NADH:ubiquinone oxidoreductase complex assembly factor 3, MC1DN18
- External IDs: OMIM: 612911; MGI: 1913956; HomoloGene: 32460; GeneCards: NDUFAF3; OMA:NDUFAF3 - orthologs

Gene location (Human)
Chr.	Chromosome 3 (human)
Band	3p21.31	Start	49,020,459 bp
Band	3p21.31	End	49,023,495 bp

Gene location (Mouse)
Chr.	Chromosome 9 (mouse)
Band	9|9 F2	Start	108,442,736 bp
Band	9|9 F2	End	108,444,633 bp
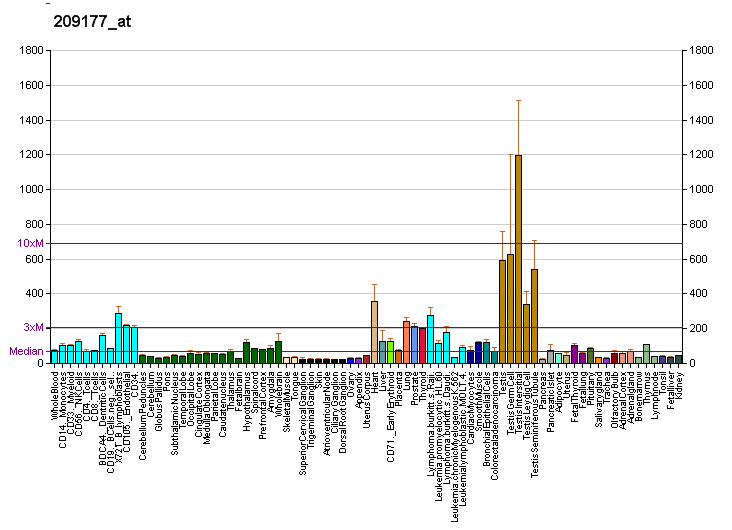
RNA expression pattern
Bgee	Human / Mouse (ortholog); Top expressed in: left testis; right testis; apex of heart; right auricle of heart; C1 segment; right adrenal gland; anterior pituitary; left adrenal gland; left adrenal cortex; right adrenal cortex / Top expressed in: left ventricle; interventricular septum; spermatocyte; adrenal gland; proximal tubule; right kidney; striatum of neuraxis; white adipose tissue; dentate gyrus of hippocampal formation granule cell; testicle; More reference expression data
BioGPS	More reference expression data
Gene ontology
Molecular function	protein binding
Cellular component	mitochondrial inner membrane; membrane; mitochondrion; nucleus
Biological process	mitochondrial respiratory chain complex I assembly
Sources:Amigo / QuickGO
Orthologs
Species	Human	Mouse
Entrez	25915	66706
Ensembl	ENSG00000178057	ENSMUSG00000070283
UniProt	Q9BU61	Q9JKL4
RefSeq (mRNA)	NM_199417; NM_199069; NM_199070; NM_199073; NM_199074	NM_023247
RefSeq (protein)	NP_951032; NP_951033; NP_951047; NP_951056	NP_075736
Location (UCSC)	Chr 3: 49.02 – 49.02 Mb	Chr 9: 108.44 – 108.44 Mb
PubMed search
- Wikidata
View/Edit Human	View/Edit Mouse

NADH dehydrogenase [ubiquinone] 1 alpha subcomplex assembly factor 3, also known as 2P1, E3-3, or C3orf60, is a protein that in humans is encoded by the NDUFAF3 gene. NDUFAF3 is a mitochondrial assembly protein involved in the assembly of NADH dehydrogenase (ubiquinone) also known as complex I, which is located in the mitochondrial inner membrane and is the largest of the five complexes of the electron transport chain. Mutations in this gene have been associated with severe complex I deficiency and Leigh syndrome.

== Structure ==
NDUFAF3 is located on the p arm of chromosome 3 in position 21.31 and has 7 exons. The NDUFAF3 gene produces a 20.4 kDa protein composed of 184 amino acids. NDUFAF3 encodes two isoforms which have a common DUF498 domain. Predictions indicate that isoform A contains an additional 35 amino acid N-terminal sequence and is thus longer than isoform B. The extra sequence may be involved in mitochondrial targeting, supporting NDUFAF3's function in mitochondrial assembly.

== Function ==
NADH:ubiquinone oxidoreductase (complex I) catalyzes the transfer of electrons from NADH to ubiquinone (coenzyme Q) in the first step of the mitochondrial respiratory chain, resulting in the translocation of protons across the mitochondrial inner membrane. The NDUFAF3 gene encodes a mitochondrial complex I assembly protein that localizes to the mitochondrial inner membrane and interacts with complex I subunits and is important for the correct function of the mitochondrial respiratory chain.

NDUFAF3 colocalizes, comigrates to several assembly intermediates, and is codependent with NDUFAF4 from the early to late stages of complex I assembly. In addition to their close interactions with each other, NDUFAF3 and NDUFAF4 interact with NDUFS2, NDUFS3, NDUFS8, and NDUFA5 in a translation-dependent early assembly mechanism. It is also suggested that NDUFAF3 is involved in coupling mitochondrial translation with membrane insertion in the process of complex I assembly.

== Clinical Significance ==
Mutations in NDUFAF3 have been associated with complex I deficiency and mitochondrial diseases. These disorders are a result of the dysfunction of the mitochondrial respiratory chain and can cause a wide range of clinical manifestations from lethal neonatal disease to adult-onset neurodegenerative disorders. Phenotypes include macrocephaly with progressive leukodystrophy, non-specific encephalopathy, cardiomyopathy, myopathy, liver disease, Leigh syndrome, Leber hereditary optic neuropathy, and some forms of Parkinson disease. Mutations have included the homozygous variants c.494C > T; p.(Ala165Val), c.365 G→C resulting in R122P, and c.2 T→C resulting in M1T. Clinically, NDUFAF3 mutations have been associated with Leigh syndrome and severe complex I deficiency. Some common signs and symptoms include lactic acidosis, nystagmus, hypotonia, and cerebral lesions.

== Interactions ==
In addition to co-complexes, NDUFAF3 has protein-protein interactions with NDUFAF4 and SNRPA.
