= Viet and Duc Nguyen =

Vietnamese conjoined twins

Viet Nguyen
- Born: 25 February 1981; Sa Thầy, Kon Tum Province, Vietnam
- Died: 6 October 2007 (aged 26); Ho Chi Minh City, Vietnam
- Known for: Conjoined twins

Duc Nguyen
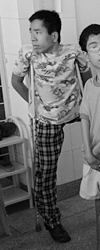
- Duc Nguyen in 2004.
- Born: 25 February 1981 (age 45); Sa Thầy, Kon Tum Province, Vietnam
- Known for: Conjoined twins
- Spouse: Nguyen Thi Thanh Tuyen (m. 2006)
- Children: Nguyễn Phú Sĩ and Nguyễn Anh Đào

Viet Nguyen (Vietnamese: Nguyễn Việt, 25 February 1981 – 6 October 2007) and Duc Nguyen (Vietnamese: Nguyễn Đức, born 25 February 1981) were a pair of Vietnamese conjoined twins surgically separated in 1988. Viet died in 2007 of natural causes.

Viet and Duc were born on 25 February 1981, in Sa Thầy, Kon Tum Province. Viet was the elder and Duc was the younger of the two brothers. Their relatives claim that the reason they became conjoined twins is the influence of Agent Orange that the U.S. military used as part of its herbicide warfare strategy during the Vietnam War. Their mother was farming in an area doused with Agent Orange a year after the Vietnam War had ended. She also drank water from a well in that area. After that, Viet and Duc were born.

Viet and Duc were born as Ischiopagus tripus conjoined twins, meaning they had separate upper bodies, but they shared the lower half, meaning they shared two legs, one set of external genitalia and one anus. Unable to care for them, their parents took the twins to Tu Du Hospital in Ho Chi Minh City in 1982. The brothers were cared for by the workers at Hoa Binh Village for the disabled, located within the hospital.

In May 1986, Viet developed a high fever and fell into a coma. The twins were immediately flown to the Japanese Red Cross Medical Center in Hiroo in Tokyo, Japan. There, Viet was diagnosed with acute necrotizing encephalopathy. The large doses of medication to treat Viet also affected Duc, who had bouts of nausea and pain. The twins remained hospitalized for about four months before being returned to Vietnam. While Duc recovered, the effects of the acute necrotizing encephalopathy left Viet's brain damaged and in a vegetative state.

On 4 October 1988, Viet and Duc were separated in Ho Chi Minh City with help from the Japanese Red Cross. It took 70 doctors 15 hours to separate the twins. The separation left Viet and Duc each with a single kidney and leg, while Duc also received the shared genitals, anus and other organs of which there was only one. Viet received a colostomy and a urostomy to compensate. After the operation, Viet went into a coma. His health problems continued after the separation, and he died due to liver failure and pneumonia on 6 October 2007, at the age of 26.

Duc completed school and now works at Tu Du Hospital's Peace Village in Ho Chi Minh City, the same hospital he lived in since 1982. On 16 December 2006, he married Nguyen Thi Thanh Tuyen in Ho Chi Minh City. The couple has two children, a boy named Phú Sĩ (after Mount Fuji) and a girl named Anh Đào (after the cherry blossom). They were born in October 2009 and their names were a dedication to the Japanese, who played an important role in Duc's separation.

In March 2021, Duc was interviewed by MCV Media. There, he recalled the events that lead to the 1988 separation, as well as his life struggles. His wife was also interviewed.

In December 2021, Duc received an award from the Japanese Foreign Ministry for promoting exchanges between Japan and Vietnam.

== See also ==
- Conjoined twins
- Vietnam War
- Agent Orange
