= NDUFAF4 =

Protein-coding gene in the species Homo sapiens

Identifiers
- Aliases: NDUFAF4, C6orf66, HRPAP20, My013, bA22L21.1, HSPC125, NADH:ubiquinone oxidoreductase complex assembly factor 4, MC1DN15
- External IDs: OMIM: 611776; MGI: 1915743; HomoloGene: 40928; GeneCards: NDUFAF4; OMA:NDUFAF4 - orthologs

Gene location (Human)
Chr.	Chromosome 6 (human)
Band	6q16.1	Start	96,889,315 bp
Band	6q16.1	End	96,897,891 bp

Gene location (Mouse)
Chr.	Chromosome 4 (mouse)
Band	4|4 A3	Start	24,898,083 bp
Band	4|4 A3	End	24,905,001 bp
RNA expression pattern
Bgee	Human / Mouse (ortholog); Top expressed in: pons; lateral nuclear group of thalamus; right ventricle; left ventricle; endothelial cell; mucosa of transverse colon; biceps brachii; right auricle of heart; apex of heart; myocardium of left ventricle / Top expressed in: atrioventricular valve; primary oocyte; endocardial cushion; digastric muscle; intercostal muscle; sternocleidomastoid muscle; temporal muscle; myocardium of ventricle; secondary oocyte; Paneth cell; More reference expression data
BioGPS	n/a
Gene ontology
Molecular function	protein binding; calmodulin binding
Cellular component	mitochondrial inner membrane; mitochondrial membranes; mitochondrion; membrane
Biological process	NADH dehydrogenase complex assembly; mitochondrial respiratory chain complex I assembly
Sources:Amigo / QuickGO
Orthologs
Species	Human	Mouse
Entrez	29078	68493
Ensembl	ENSG00000123545	ENSMUSG00000028261
UniProt	Q9P032	Q9D1H6
RefSeq (mRNA)	NM_014165	NM_026742
RefSeq (protein)	NP_054884	NP_081018
Location (UCSC)	Chr 6: 96.89 – 96.9 Mb	Chr 4: 24.9 – 24.91 Mb
PubMed search
- Wikidata
View/Edit Human	View/Edit Mouse

NADH:ubiquinone oxidoreductase complex assembly factor 4, (NDUFAF4) also known as Hormone-regulated proliferation-associated protein of 20 kDa, (HRPAP20) or C6orf66 is a protein that in humans is encoded by the NDUFAF4 gene. NDUFAF4 is a mitochondrial assembly protein involved in the assembly of NADH dehydrogenase (ubiquinone) also known as complex I, which is located in the mitochondrial inner membrane and is the largest of the five complexes of the electron transport chain. Mutations in this gene have been associated with complex I deficiency and infantile mitochondrial encephalomyopathy. Elevations in HRPAP20 have also been implicated in breast cancer.

== Structure ==
NDUFAF4 is located on the q arm of chromosome 6 in position 16.1 and has 3 exons. The NDUFAF4 gene produces a 23.7 kDa protein composed of 203 amino acids. HRPAP20 is a phosphoprotein, containing a phosphate group attachment and, potentially, multiple kinase recognition sequences. Additionally, it has a CaM-binding sequence that allows it to interact with calmodulin (CaM), which itself is involved in numerous cellular processes.

== Function ==
NADH:ubiquinone oxidoreductase (complex I) catalyzes the transfer of electrons from NADH to ubiquinone (coenzyme Q) in the first step of the mitochondrial respiratory chain, resulting in the translocation of protons across the inner mitochondrial membrane. NDUFAF4 encodes a complex I assembly factor that is important for the correct assembly and function of complex I. NDUFAF4 colocalizes, comigrates to several assembly intermediates, and is codependent with NDUFAF3 from the early to late stages of complex I assembly. In addition to their close interactions with each other, NDUFAF4 and NDUFAF3 interact with NDUFS2, NDUFS3, NDUFS8, and NDUFA5 in a translation-dependent early assembly mechanism. NDUFAF4 has also been shown to play a role in growth and apoptosis regulation through a CaM-mediated mechanism involving MMP-9 secretion.

== Clinical significance ==
Mutations in NDUFAF4 (HRPAP20) have been associated with mitochondrial complex I deficiency, infantile mitochondrial encephalomyopathy. Additionally, research analyzing HRPAP20's effect on human cancer cells have suggested that it plays a role in tumor metastasis, malignant progression, and breast cancer.

Mitochondrial diseases are disorders that are the result of the dysfunction of the mitochondrial respiratory chain. They can cause a wide range of clinical manifestations from lethal neonatal disease to adult-onset neurodegenerative disorders. Phenotypes include macrocephaly with progressive leukodystrophy, non-specific encephalopathy, cardiomyopathy, myopathy, liver disease, Leigh syndrome, Leber hereditary optic neuropathy, and some forms of Parkinson disease. Pathogenic mutations have been linked to changes in a 2.6 Mb critical region (97.17–99.77 Mb) on chromosome 6 and have included a T→C substitution at p. 194 in exon 2 that predicts a Leu65Pro variant. Clinically, NDUFAF4 mutations have been associated with infantile mitochondrial encephalomyopathy, with lactic acidosis, nystagmus, hypotonia, cardiomyopathy, cerebral atrophy, and generalized tonic-clonic convulsions as some possible symptoms.

HRPAP20 was found to be significantly elevated in patient breast tumors as compared to normal tissue. Further analysis using tumor cell lines with constitutively expressed HRPAP20 suggests that it increases the invasiveness, proliferation, and apoptotic suppression of breast cancer cells. This is often indicative of tumor metastasis and malignant progression.

== Interactions ==
NDUFAF4 (HRPAP20) has been shown to interact closely with NDUFAF3 as well as with NDUFS2, NDUFS3, NDUFS8, and NDUFA5 in the mitochondrial inner membrane. HRPAP20 also interacts with calmodulin (CaM) in a mechanism that results in increased MMP-9 secretion, associated with increased invasiveness in breast cancer cells. In addition to co-complexes, NDUFAF4 has protein-protein interactions with WDR26.
