= Sa Thầy district =

Coordinates: 14.333°N 107.667°E

Sa Thầy district Huyện Sa Thầy
- District
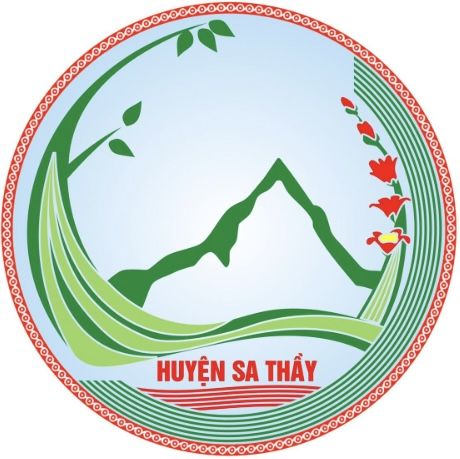
- Seal

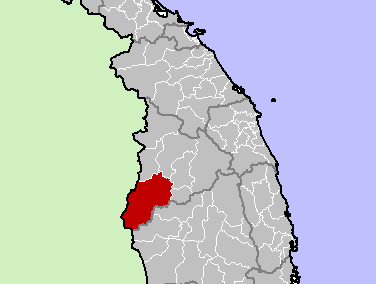
- Location in Kon Tum province
- Country: Vietnam
- Province: Kon Tum
- Capital: Sa Thầy

Area
  - Total: 931 sq mi (2,412 km^{2})

Population (2018)
  - Total: 42,703
- Time zone: UTC+7 (Indochina Time)

Sa Thầy is a rural district of Kon Tum province in the Central Highlands region of Vietnam.

== Geography ==
Sa Thầy is a very mountainous district, with many hydroelectric dam projects located along the major rivers. The district has one of the lowest population densities in Vietnam. As of 2003 the district had a population of 29,605. The district covers an area of 2,412 square kilometres (931 sq mi). The district capital lies at Sa Thầy.

== History ==
Its name Sa-thầy in Kinh language is originated from Eă Yăgrai in Yagrai language, which means "the stream of the dragon".

== See also ==
- Lung Leng
