= The Green Man (Amis novel) =

1969 novel by Kingsley Amis

- Cover of the first US edition, published by Harcourt, Brace & World.
- Author: Kingsley Amis
- Language: English
- Publisher: Cape
- Publication date: 1969
- ISBN: 0-224-61740-0 (first edition)
- Dewey Decimal: 823.914
- LC Class: PR6001.M6 G7

The Green Man is a 1969 novel by British author Kingsley Amis. A Times Literary Supplement reviewer described The Green Man as "three genres of novel in one": ghost story, moral fable, and comic novel. The novel reflects Amis's willingness to experiment with genre novels (e.g., The Alteration, a science fiction and alternate history work, or Colonel Sun: A James Bond Adventure) while displaying many of the characteristics of his conventional novels, both in superficial aspects such as fogeyishness and problems with alcohol, and in more substantive aspects such as a self-reflective observation of human cruelty and selfishness in everyday relations.

== Setting ==
The novel is set in and around The Green Man, an inn near the town of Baldock owned by Maurice Allington, a 53-year-old man with a second wife, a teenage daughter and an 80-year-old father living with him in the inn's upstairs apartment. The inn and its name date back to the 14th century, and the inn's charm is further embellished by a history of haunting related to a 17th-century owner, Thomas Underhill, a Cambridge scholar who dabbled in the occult. Underhill was associated with two unsolved murders, including that of his wife, which could not be traced back to him.

== Plot ==
As the novel unfolds, Allington is beset by a number of difficulties, including his father's death by stroke at dinner one night, and a drinking problem that causes hypnagogic jactitation and hallucinations; Maurice compounds his problems by pursuing an affair with his doctor's wife, neglecting his daughter Amy (whose mother, Maurice's first wife, was killed in a road accident), and attempting to seduce both his current wife and his mistress into a ménage à trois, which backfires when the two women take an enthusiastic interest in each other and effectively shut him out of the orgy.

During this time Maurice begins to see ghosts around the inn – a red-haired woman, presumably Underhill's wife, in the hallway, a small bird floating above his bathtub, the spectre of Thomas Underhill himself in the dining room – and yet has a difficult time communicating this to his family and friends, who assume that heavy drinking and the stress of his father's death are causing him to hallucinate. Maurice's own investigations take him to All Saints' College, a fictional Cambridge college (modeled on All Souls' of Oxford) of which Underhill was a fellow, and at which his papers are secreted. There he sees Underhill's own record of having used his black arts to entice and then ravish young girls from the village.

In the meantime Maurice has discovered his own notes of a drunken, and forgotten, midnight conversation with Underhill, during which Underhill begins to enlist Maurice's help in his as yet undisclosed scheme. This involves Maurice's unearthing of Underhill's nearby grave, in which he finds an ancient silver figurine that Underhill requests be brought to another midnight meeting in the inn's dining room.

That afternoon, having left the scene of the failed orgy, Maurice suddenly finds himself in a strange time warp, as it were, in which all molecular motion outside his drawing room ceases. He finds himself in the presence of a young, suave man who it comes to be understood is God himself. The purpose of the visit is to warn Maurice against Underhill and ask him to aid in Underhill's destruction, but during the conversation, Amis has the young man elaborate an interesting sort of theology, explaining the Creation and God's powers within it. The young man leaves Maurice with a silver crucifix, as a sort of counter-weight to the silver figurine.

When the midnight meeting comes about, Underhill attempts to delight Maurice with a sort of holographic yet primitive pornography show; Maurice feels he is in a damp, murky cave, on the walls of which are projected bizarre sexual scenes. As the show becomes more terrifying, Maurice realises that Underhill has absented himself; when he hears his daughter crying out from the road in front of the inn, he realises Underhill's intentions. In the climactic scene, Maurice uses the crucifix to stun Underhill and runs outside, where he confronts the entity Underhill had used the figurine to conjure: the green man, a collection of branches, twigs and leaves in the form of a large and powerful man. The thing is bent, evidently, on killing or sexually assaulting Maurice's daughter Amy. By hurling the figurine back into the graveyard Maurice saps Underhill's power and destroys the green man. Underhill's purpose had been, apparently, to have Amy killed as a sort of experiment in lieu of the sexual depredations which are now forbidden him by his lack of corporeality.

A final scene wraps up the novel's loose ends: Maurice destroys the figurine, and he employs the modish, cynical and repellent parish priest (who makes God out to be, in the young man's words, a “suburban Mao Tse-tung”) to exorcise Underhill and his green man. Maurice wonders why a being like Underhill should have been drawn to him, of all the potential targets across all the centuries, and is humiliated by the possible explanations. Maurice's wife leaves him (for his mistress), but his daughter proposes, and he agrees to, a plan to move away from The Green Man and get a fresh start. Maurice is somewhat relieved, while recognising that he will remain until his death trapped in all of the faults, petty and otherwise, that constitute him as Maurice Allington.

== Adaptation ==
The novel was adapted as a BBC three-part TV serial which aired in 1990, starring Albert Finney.

Amis's short story "Who or What Was It?" began life as a BBC radio broadcast by the author and is a kind-of sequel to the novel: in his introduction to his Collected Short Stories, Amis says that several people believed the story behind the broadcast and by implication the supernatural aspect of The Green Man to be true.
