= IDAE =

IDAE may refer to:

- Infectious disease-associated encephalopathy, neurological complications of infectious diseases
- Instituto para la Diversificación y Ahorro de la Energía, a Spanish government agency
