= Organic brain syndrome =

Disorder of mental function whose cause is alleged to be known as physiological

- Other names: Organic brain disease; Organic brain disorder; Organic mental syndrome; Organic mental disorder
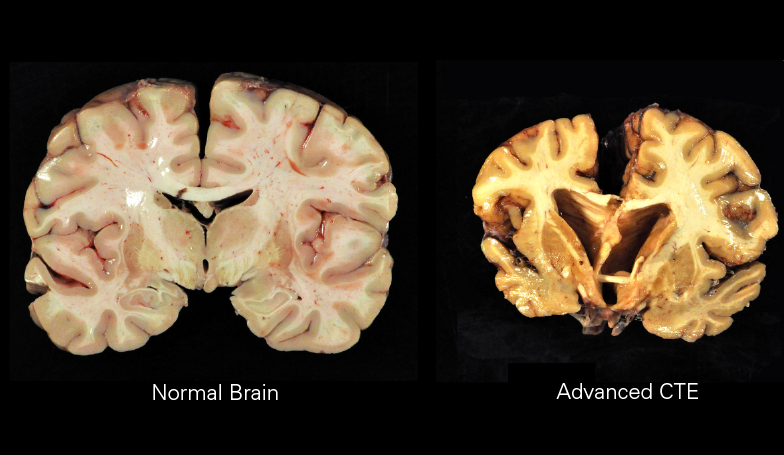
- Encephalopathy as a result of head trauma is a possible cause of organic brain syndrome.
- Specialty: Psychiatry, Neurology
- Symptoms: Depends on the cause, usually memory problems, personality changes, mood swings, cognitive impairment, vision and movement problems
- Usual onset: Over 60 years old
- Causes: Organ damage, generally of the brain
- Risk factors: Head trauma, intoxication with certain substances, infection, vitamin deficiency
- Differential diagnosis: Schizophrenia, bipolar disorder, post concussion syndrome, drug withdrawal

Organic brain syndrome, also known as organic brain disease, organic brain damage, organic brain disorder (OBD), organic mental syndrome, or organic mental disorder, refers to any syndrome or disorder of mental function whose cause is alleged to be known as organic (physiologic) rather than purely of the mind. These names are older and nearly obsolete general terms from psychiatry, referring to many physical disorders that cause impaired mental function. They are meant to exclude psychiatric disorders (mental disorders). Originally, the term was created to distinguish physical (termed "organic") causes of mental impairment from psychiatric (termed "functional") disorders, but during the era when this distinction was drawn, not enough was known about brain science (including neuroscience, cognitive science, neuropsychology, and mind-brain correlation) for this cause-based classification to be more than educated guesswork labeled with misplaced certainty, which is why it has been deemphasized in current medicine. While mental or behavioural abnormalities related to the dysfunction can be permanent, treating the disease early may prevent permanent damage in addition to fully restoring mental functions. An organic cause to brain dysfunction is suspected when there is no indication of a clearly defined psychiatric or "inorganic" cause, such as a mood disorder.

== Types ==
Organic brain syndrome can be divided into 2 major subgroups: acute (delirium or acute confusional state) and chronic (dementia). A third entity, encephalopathy (amnestic), denotes a gray zone between delirium and dementia. The Diagnostic and Statistical Manual of Mental Disorders has broken up the diagnoses that once fell under the diagnostic category organic mental disorder into three categories: delirium, dementia, and amnestic.

=== Delirium ===
Delirium or Acute organic brain syndrome is a recently appearing state of mental impairment, as a result of intoxication, drug overdose, infection, pain, and many other physical problems affecting mental status. In medical contexts, "acute" means "of recent onset". As is the case with most acute disease problems, acute organic brain syndrome is often temporary, although this does not guarantee that it will not recur or progress to become chronic, that is, long-term. A more specific medical term for the acute subset of organic brain syndromes is delirium.

=== Dementia ===
Dementia or chronic organic brain syndrome is long-term. For example, some forms of chronic drug or alcohol dependence can cause organic brain syndrome due to their long-lasting or permanent toxic effects on brain function. Other common causes of chronic organic brain syndrome sometimes listed are the various types of dementia, which result from permanent brain damage due to strokes, Alzheimer's disease, or other damaging causes which are irreversible. Amnestic pertains to amnesia and is the impairment in ability to learn or recall new information, or recall previously learned information. Although similar, it is not coupled with dementia or delirium.

=== Amnestic ===
Amnestic conditions denotes a gray zone between delirium and dementia; its early course may fluctuate, but it is often persistent and progressive. Damage to brain functioning could be due not only to organic (physical) injury (a severe blow to the head, stroke, chemical and toxic exposures, organic brain disease, substance use, etc.) and also to non-organic means such as severe deprivation, abuse, neglect, and severe psychological trauma.

== Symptoms ==
Many of the symptoms of Organic Mental Disorder depend on the cause of the disorder, but are similar and include physical or behavioral elements. Dementia and delirium are the cause of the confusion, orientation, cognition or alertness impairment. Therefore, these symptoms require more attention because hallucinations, delusions, amnesia, and personality changes are the result. These effects of the dementia and delirium are not joined with the changes of sensory or perception abilities. Memory impairment, judgment, logical function and agitation are also some extremely common symptoms. The more common symptoms of OBS are confusion; impairment of memory, judgment, and intellectual function; and agitation. Often these symptoms are attributed to psychiatric illness, which causes a difficulty in diagnosis.

=== Associated conditions ===
Disorders that are related to injury or damage to the brain and contribute to OBS include, but are not limited to:

- Alcoholism
- Alzheimer's disease
- Attention deficit/hyperactivity disorder
- Autism
- Concussion
- Encephalitis
- Epilepsy
- Fetal alcohol syndrome
- Hypoxia
- Parkinson's disease
- Intoxication/overdose caused by substance use disorders including alcohol use disorder
- Non-medical use of sedative hypnotics
- Intracranial hemorrhage/trauma
- Korsakoff syndrome
- Mastocytosis
- Meningitis
- Psychoorganic syndrome
- Stroke/transient ischemic attack (TIA)
- Withdrawal from drugs, especially sedative hypnotics, e.g. alcohol or benzodiazepines

Other conditions that may be related to organic brain syndrome include: clinical depression, neuroses, and psychoses, which may occur simultaneously with the OBS.

== Treatment ==
While the treatment depends on which particular disorder is involved in Organic Mental Disorder, a few that are possible. Treatments can include, but are not limited to, rehabilitation therapy such as physical or occupational, pharmacological modification of the neurotransmitter function, or medication. The affected parts of the brain can recover some function with the help of different types of therapy, or tractographical psysurgery. Online therapy can be just as intense and helpful as rehabilitation therapy, in person, and can help those affected regain function in daily life.

== Prognosis ==
Some disorders are short-term and treatable, and their prognosis is not as lengthy. Rest and medication are the most common courses of action for these treatable cases to help the patient return to proper health. Many of the cases are long-term, and there is not as much of a set and defined prognosis. The course of action can include extensive counseling and therapy. There are many reasons that the long-term cases are harder to treat and these include these cases normally get worse over time, and medication or therapy could not work. In this case, many of the prognosis tracks are to help the patient and their family become more comfortable and understand what will happen.

=== Associated conditions ===
- Brain injury caused by trauma
  - Bleeding into the brain (intracerebral hemorrhage)
  - Bleeding into the space around the brain (subarachnoid hemorrhage)
  - Blood clot inside the skull causing pressure on brain (subdural hematoma)
  - Concussion
- Breathing conditions
  - Low oxygen in the body (hypoxia)
  - High carbon dioxide levels in the body (hypercapnia)
- Cardiovascular disorders
  - Abnormal heart rhythm (arrhythmias)
  - Brain injury due to high blood pressure (hypertensive brain injury)
  - Dementia due to many strokes (multi-infarct dementia)
  - Heart infections (endocarditis, myocarditis)
  - Stroke
  - Transient ischemic attack (TIA)
- Degenerative disorders
  - Alzheimer's disease (also called senile dementia, Alzheimer's type)
  - Creutzfeldt–Jakob disease
  - Diffuse Lewy Body disease
  - Huntington's disease
  - Multiple sclerosis
  - Normal pressure hydrocephalus
  - Parkinson's disease
  - Pick's disease
- Dementia due to metabolic causes
- Drug and alcohol-related conditions
  - Alcohol withdrawal state
  - Intoxication from drug or alcohol use
  - Wernicke–Korsakoff syndrome (a long-term effect of excessive alcohol consumption or malnutrition)
  - Withdrawal from drugs (especially sedative-hypnotics and corticosteroids)
- Infections
  - Any sudden onset (acute) or long-term (chronic) infection
  - Blood poisoning (sepsis)
  - Brain infection (encephalitis)
  - Meningitis (infection of the lining of the brain and spinal cord)
  - Prion infections such as mad cow disease
  - Late-stage syphilis (general paresis)
- Other medical disorders
  - Cancer
  - Kidney disease
  - Liver disease
  - Thyroid disease (high or low)
  - Vitamin deficiency (B1, B12, or folate)
- Lithium toxicity can cause permanent organic brain damage
- Accumulation of metals in the brains
  - Aluminum
  - Mercury poisoning
