= Lung Leng =

Archaeological site in Vietnam

Lung Leng is an archaeological site located in Sa Binh commune, Sa Thầy District, Kon Tum Province of the Central Highlands region of Vietnam.

The site was discovered in 1999 during the construction of a hydroelectric power plant. Excavated in 1999 and 2001, the site covers an area of around 11,500 square meters or roughly 123,784.97 square feet. Archaeologists have recovered over 14,000 stone, pottery and metal artifacts from Lung Leng. The excavation of Lung Leng is recognized as one of the largest archaeological excavations to be conducted by the Vietnamese. The artifacts found here are intended to be displayed at the HCM City Historical Museum and are the first signs of the Son Vi culture in the Central Highlands in Vietnam. This culture dates back to the Paleolithic age.
