= Glycine N-methyltransferase =

Class of enzymes

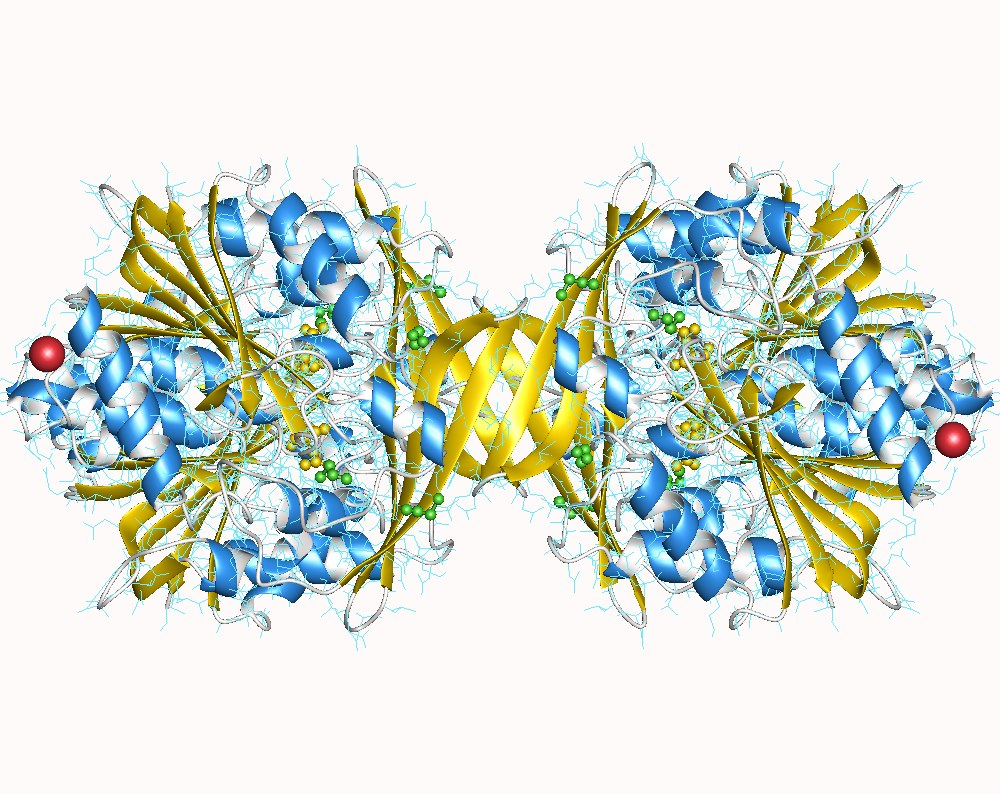

Identifiers
- EC no.: 2.1.1.20
- CAS no.: 37228-72-1

Databases
- IntEnz: IntEnz view
- BRENDA: BRENDA entry
- ExPASy: NiceZyme view
- KEGG: KEGG entry
- MetaCyc: metabolic pathway
- PRIAM: profile
- PDB structures: RCSB PDB PDBe PDBsum
- Gene Ontology: AmiGO / QuickGO
Search
- PMC: articles
- PubMed: articles
- NCBI: proteins

Glycine N-methyltransferase (EC 2.1.1.20) is an enzyme that catalyzes the chemical reaction

glycine
+ SAM
sarcosine
+ SAH

The enzyme catalyses a methylation reaction in which the amino acid glycine is converted to sarcosine. The methyl group comes from the cofactor, S-adenosyl methionine (SAM), which loses its methyl group and becomes S-adenosyl-L-homocysteine (SAH).

Glycine N-methyltransferase belongs to the family of methyltransferase enzymes. The systematic name of this enzyme class is S-adenosyl-L-methionine:glycine N-methyltransferase. Other names in common use include glycine methyltransferase, S-adenosyl-L-methionine:glycine methyltransferase, and GNMT. It regulates methyl group metabolism in the liver and pancreas by alterating the ratio between SAM and SAH. It is inhibited by 5-methyltetrahydrofolate pentaglutamate. The product, sarcosine is converted back into glycine by the enzyme sarcosine dehydrogenase.

== Structural studies ==
The crystal structure of three variants of the mammalian enzyme have been compared.
