= Sarcosinemia =

- Other names: Sarcosine dehydrogenase complex deficiency
- Sarcosine
- Specialty: Endocrinology

Sarcosinemia (SAR), also called hypersarcosinemia and SARDH deficiency, is a rare autosomal recessive metabolic disorder characterized by an increased concentration of sarcosine in blood plasma and urine ("sarcosinuria"). It can result from an inborn error of sarcosine metabolism, or from severe folate deficiency related to the folate requirement for the conversion of sarcosine to glycine. It is thought to be a relatively benign condition.

== Cause ==
Sarcosinemia has an autosomal recessive pattern of inheritance.

Sarcosinemia is thought to be caused by a mutation in the sarcosine dehydrogenase (SARDH) gene, which is located at human chromosome 9q34.

The disease is inherited in an autosomal recessive manner, which means the defective gene responsible for the disorder is located on an autosome (chromosome 9 is an autosome), and two copies of the defective gene (one inherited from each parent) are required in order to be born with the disorder. The parents of an individual with an autosomal recessive disorder both carry one copy of the defective gene, but usually do not experience any signs or symptoms of the disorder.

== See also ==
- Inborn errors of metabolism
