= Sarcosine dehydrogenase =

Class of enzymes

Identifiers
- EC no.: 1.5.8.3
- CAS no.: 37228-65-2

Databases
- BRENDA: enzyme data
- ExPASy: NiceZyme view
- KEGG: enzyme entry
- MetaCyc: metabolic pathway
- Rhea: reactions
- PDB structures: RCSB PDB PDBe PDBsum
- Gene Ontology: AmiGO / QuickGO
Search
- PMC: articles
- PubMed: articles
- NCBI: proteins

In enzymology, sarcosine dehydrogenase (EC 1.5.8.3) is a mitochondrial enzyme that catalyzes the chemical reaction N-demethylation of sarcosine to give glycine. This enzyme belongs to the family of oxidoreductases, specifically those acting on the CH-NH group of donor with other acceptors. The systematic name of this enzyme class is sarcosine:acceptor oxidoreductase (demethylating). Other names in common use include sarcosine N-demethylase, monomethylglycine dehydrogenase, and sarcosine:(acceptor) oxidoreductase (demethylating). Sarcosine dehydrogenase is closely related to dimethylglycine dehydrogenase, which catalyzes the demethylation reaction of dimethylglycine to sarcosine. Both sarcosine dehydrogenase and dimethylglycine dehydrogenase use FAD as a cofactor. Sarcosine dehydrogenase is linked by electron-transferring flavoprotein (ETF) to the respiratory redox chain. The general chemical reaction catalyzed by sarcosine dehydrogenase is:

sarcosine + acceptor + H_{2}O $\rightleftharpoons$ glycine + formaldehyde + reduced acceptor

== Structure ==
There is no crystal structure available for sarcosine dehydrogenase. Sarcosine dehydrogenase contains a covalently bound FAD group " linked via the 8 alpha position of the isoalloxazine ring to an imidazole N(3) of a histidine residue". The enzyme, according to Freisell Wr. et al., also contains non-heme iron in a ratio of 1 or 2 iron per 300000g of enzyme, and 0.5 mol of acid soluble sulfur suggesting that the electron transfer during the first step in the reaction might proceed through a different pathway than that of Fe-S clusters.

== Mechanism ==
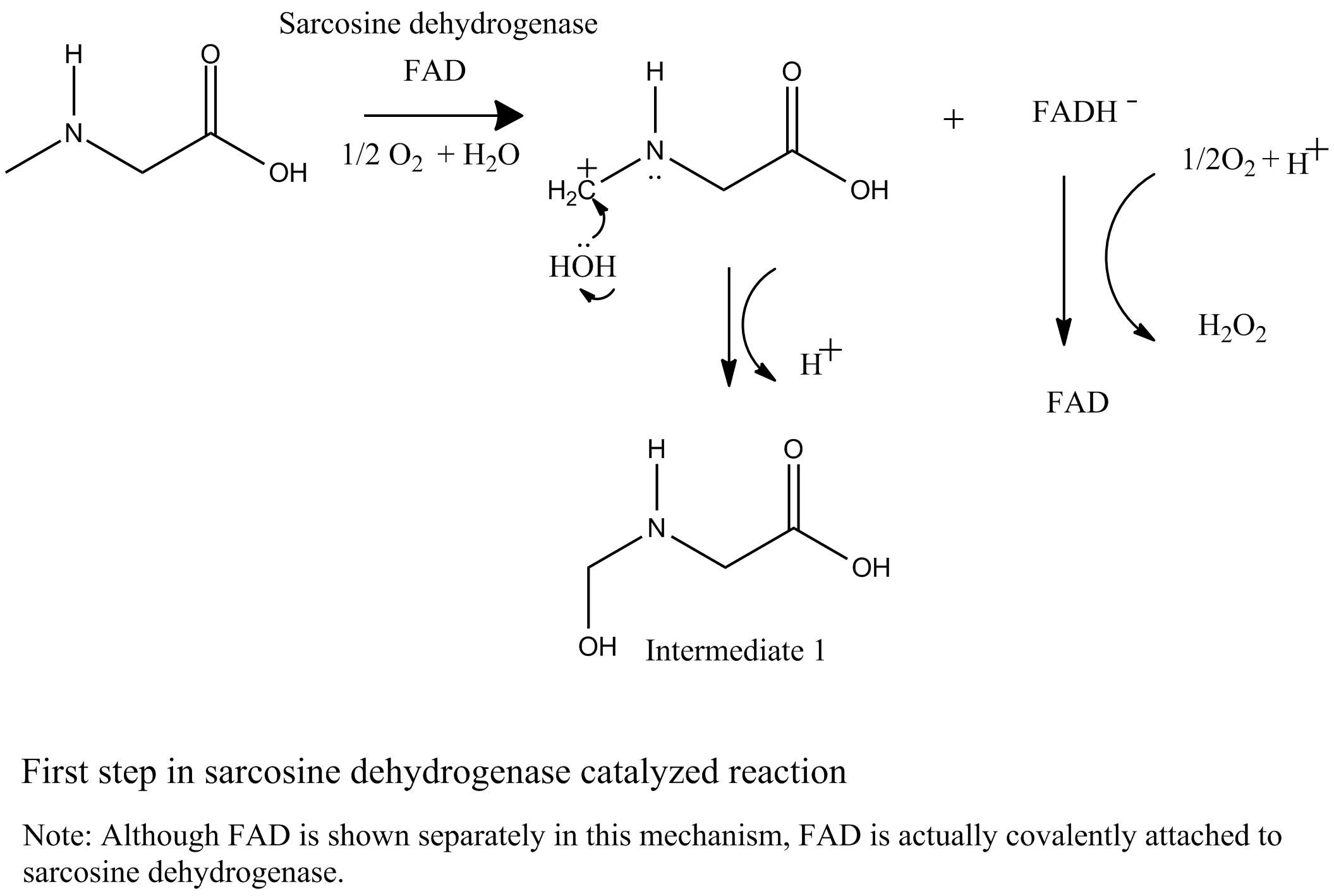
Figure 1: First step in sarcosine dehydrogenase catalyzed reaction mechanism

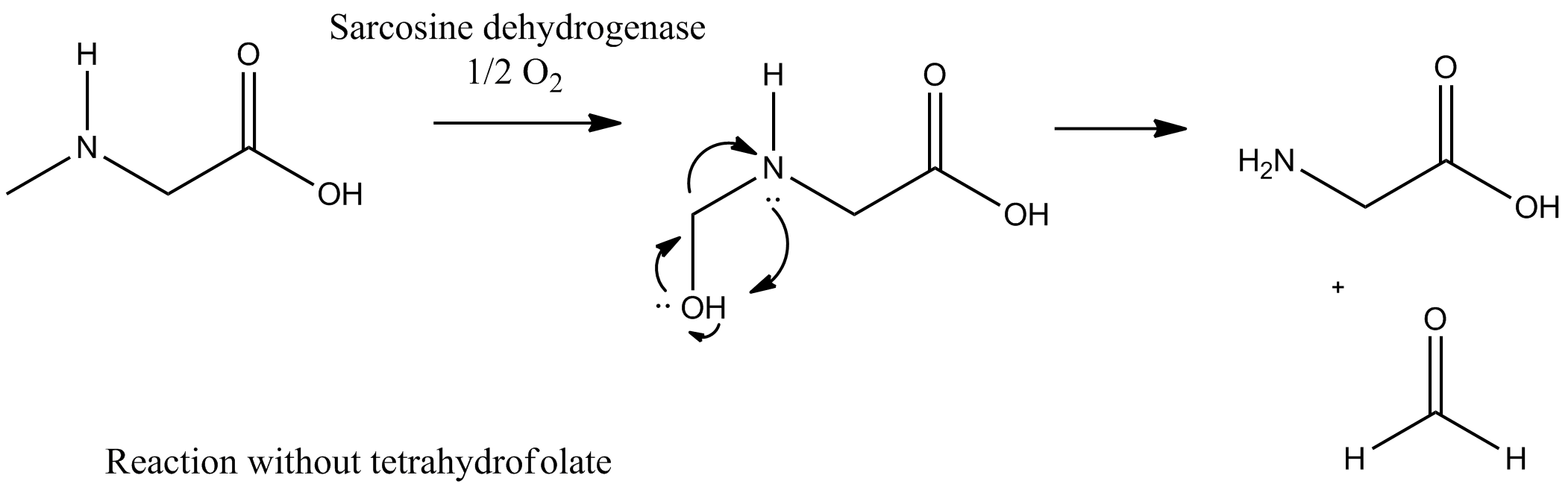
Figure 2: Sarcosine going to glycine reaction mechanism without THF present.

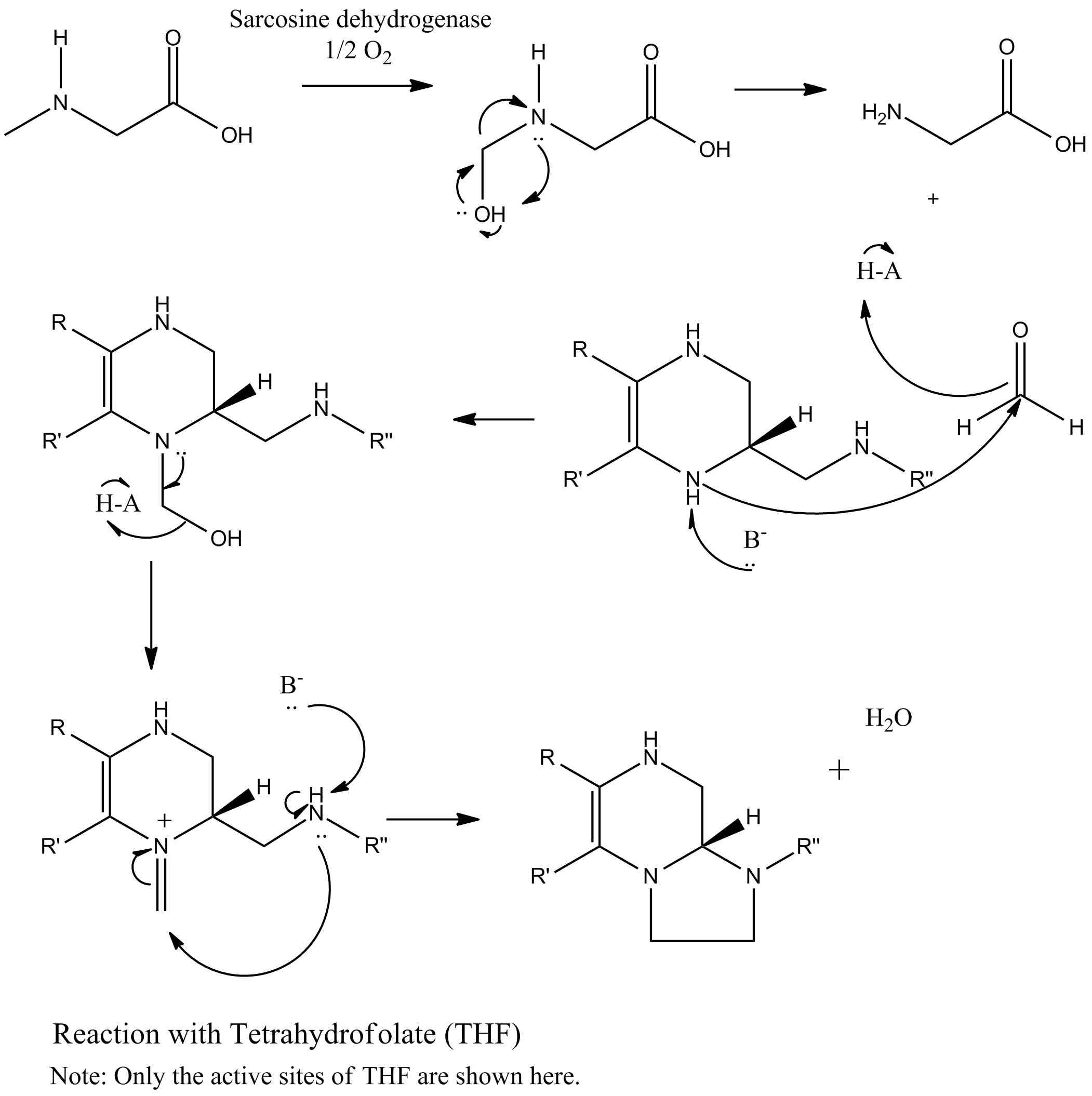
Figure 3: Sarcosine going to glycine reaction mechanism with tetrahydrofolate (THF) present.

Sarcosine dehydrogenase, with sarcosine as its substrate, follows Michaelis–Menten kinetics and has a Km of 0.5 mM and a Vmax of 16 mmol/hr/mg protein. The enzyme is inhibited competitively by methoxyacetic acid, which has a Ki of 0.26 mM

The exact mechanism of sarcosine dehydrogenase is not available. However, according to the overall net reaction discussed in Honova.E, et al. paper:

- Sarcosine + H_{2}O + O_{2} → glycine + formaldehyde + H_{2}O_{2}

the first step of the reaction might involve the transfer of a hydride on the N-methyl group of sarcosine onto FAD, allowing H_{2}O to attack the carbocation in order to form intermediate 1 (See figure 1). There is no deamination step. Instead, the demethylation of the N-methyl group on sarcosine occurs directly. The reduced FADH^{−} from the first step then is oxidized by O_{2} to form H_{2}O_{2}.

The demethylation of sarcosine catalyzed by sarcosine dehydrogenase can proceed with or without the presence of tetrahydrofolate. Under anaerobic condition and without tetrahydrofolate, however, a free formaldehyde is formed after the N-demethylation of sarcosine. The reaction with 1 mole of sarcosine and 1 mole of FAD, under this condition, yields 1 mole of glycine and 1 mole of formaldehyde (See figure 2 for mechanism).

Under the presence of tetrahydrofolate, sarcosine dehydrogenase binds to tetrahydrofolate and convert tetrahydrofolate to 5,10-methylenetetrahydrofolate. Tetrahydrofolate here serves as a 1-carbon acceptor during the demethylation process (See figure 3 for mechanism).

== Function ==
Sarcosine dehydrogenase is one of the enzymes in sarcosine metabolism, which catalyzes the demethylation of sarcosine to make glycine. It is preceded by dimethylglycine dehydrogenase which turns dimethylglycine into sarcosine. Glycine can also be turned into sarcosine by glycine N-methyltransferase. Since glycine is the production of sarcosine dehydrogenase catalyzed reaction, aside from sarcosine metabolism, the enzyme is also indirectly connected to the creatine cycle and the respiratory chain in the mitochondria (See figure 4 for pathway). Even so, the biological significance of sarcosine dehydrogenase beyond sarcosine metabolism is not entirely known. In a study of hereditary hemochromatosis using both wild type and HFE (gene) deficient mice fed with 2 percent carbonyl iron supplemented diet, sarcosine dehydrogenase was shown to be down-regulated in HFE deficient mice, but role sarcosine dehydrogenase in iron metabolism is unknown from the experiment conducted.

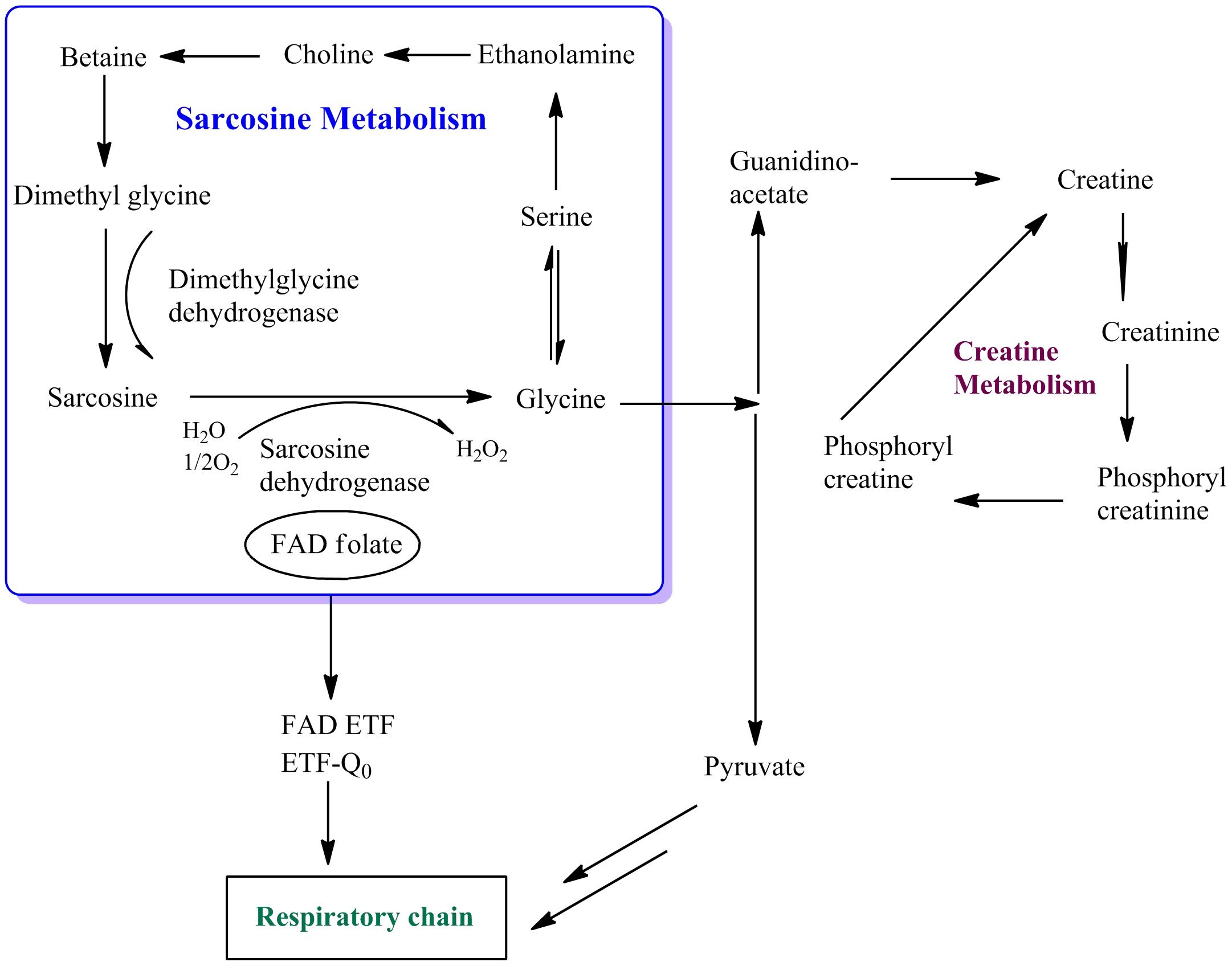
Figure 4: Sarcosine metabolism and related pathway.

== Disease relevance ==
=== Sarcosinemia ===
Sarcosinemia is an autosomal recessive disease caused by a mutation of the sarcosine dehydrogenase gene in the 9q33-q34 gene locus. This leads to a compromised sarcosine metabolism and causes the build-up of sarcosine in blood and urine, a condition known as sarcosinemia.

=== Prostate cancer ===
In addition to sarcosinaemia, sarcosine dehydrogenase also seems to play a role in the progression process of prostate cancer. The concentration of sarcosine, along with those of uracil, kynurenine, glycerol 3-phosphate, leucine and proline increases as prostate cancer progresses. Thus, sarcosine can be used as a potential biomarker for the detection of prostate cancer and for measuring the progress of the disease. As Sreekumar, A. et al.’s paper shows, the removal of sarcosine dehydrogenase from benign prostate epithelial cells increases the concentration of sarcosine and increase cancer cell invasions while the removal of either dimethylglycine dehydrogenase or glycine N-methyltransferase in prostate cancer cells decreases cell invasions. This demonstrates that sarcosine metabolism plays a key-role in prostate cancer cell invasion and migration. Sreekumar’s study suggests that sarcosine dehydrogenase and other enzymes in the sarcosine metabolism pathways could be potential therapeutic targets for prostate cancer. However, a study done by Jentzmik F. et al. by analyzing sarcosine level in 92 patients with prostate cancer draws a different conclusion: sarcosine cannot be used as an indicator and biomarker for prostate cancer.

== See also ==
- Sarcosinemia
- Sarcosine
- Dimethylglycine dehydrogenase
