= Psychoorganic syndrome =

Progressive neurological disorder

Psychoorganic syndrome (POS), also known as organic psychosyndrome, is a progressive disease comparable to presenile dementia. It consists of psychopathological complex of symptoms that are caused by organic brain disorders that involve a reduction in memory and intellect. Psychoorganic syndrome is often accompanied by asthenia.

Psychoorganic syndrome occurs during atrophy of the brain, most commonly during presenile and senile age (e.g. Alzheimer's disease, senile dementia). There are many causes, including cerebrovascular diseases, CNS damage due to traumatic brain injury, intoxication, exposure to organic solvents such as toluene, chronic metabolic disorders, tumors and abscesses of the brain, encephalitis, and can also be found in cases of diseases accompanied by convulsive seizures. Psychoorganic syndrome may occur at any age but is most pronounced in elderly and senile age.

Depending on the nosological entity, the main symptoms of psychoorganic syndrome are expressed differently. For example, in atrophic cases such as Alzheimer's disease, the symptoms are more geared towards a memory disorder, while in Pick's disease, mental disorders are more commonly expressed.

== Symptoms ==
Patients with psychoorganic syndrome often complain about headaches, dizziness, unsteadiness when walking, poor tolerance to the heat, stuffiness, atmospheric pressure changes, loud sounds, neurological symptoms.

The common reported psychological symptoms include:

- loss of memory and concentration
- emotional lability
- Clinical fatigue
- long term major depression
- severe anxiety
- reduced intellectual ability

The cognitive and behavioral symptoms are chronic and have little response to treatment.

Depending on lesion location, some patients may experience visual complications.

== Cause ==
Psycho-organic syndrome is typically diagnosed in individuals following 5–10 years of consistent exposure to chemicals like xylene, toluene, and styrene, which are generally found in paint, plastic and degreasing products.

Patients work and environmental history must be evaluated for exposure to organic chemicals. A traumatic brain injury may also lead to POS.

Although the cause varies in each individual case, localization of the atrophy in the brain can occur due to aging and without external causes.

Prevention includes proper and regular use of Personal Protective Equipment (PPE) in work environments that involve organic chemicals and limiting alcohol and drug substance intake.

== Mechanism ==
Psychoorganic syndrome is a combination of various symptoms that are caused by organic changes in the brain. The exact component of the solvents that causes the neurological disorder is difficult to isolate due to worker generally being exposed to mixtures of various grades, compositions, and purity of solvents.

At the initial stage, asthenia is prevalent and the progress of the disorder is slow. Acute onset can be diagnosed when a large amount of psychological symptoms surface. The final stage of the disorder is made up of numerous disorders, including dementia, Korsakov's syndrome, and includes severe personality change such as depression, anxiety, memory loss, and drastic change in intellect. Level of kindness, happiness, and insight are greatly affect in the final stage.

The disorder stems from a defect in brain tissue, usually atrophy from another neurological disorder.

"In pathological findings, focal or diffuse signs of atrophy without inflammation or severe vascular insufficiency are present. Basic clinical picture depends on the localization of atrophy in brain."

Although the exact mechanism that solvents have on the nervous system are not fully understood, the metabolism of the solvents in the body that turn them into toxic intermediates are important. Some evidence shows that genetic polymorphisms affect the activity of metabolic enzymes that metabolize foreign chemicals.

== Diagnosis ==
Along with occupational and environmental evaluation, a neurological exam, ECHO, EEG, CT Scan, and X-ray of the brain may be conducted to determine disorder. Neuroimaging that detects cerebral atrophy or cardiovascular subcortical alterations can help point to psychoorganic syndrome. Strong CNS lesions are detected in POS patients. However, this is found to be difficult as many psychiatric disorders, like dementia, have common diagnosis.

Diagnosing POS is an ongoing and developing in the medical and psychiatric industry. Exact diagnosis is difficult due to many symptoms mirroring other psychological disorders in the older aged patients.

=== Various symptom diagnosis ===
CT scan or MRI can confirm dementia via observation of ventricular dilation and cortical substance degeneration.

Pick's disease can be confirmed via CT scan or MRI with atrophy of frontal and temporal lobe roots.

Alzheimer's is a disease confirmed by atrophy of the parietal and temporal lobe ganglia along with changes in the cortical ganglia found in a CT scan or MRI.

== Treatment ==
In a confirmed medical diagnosis, therapy is used to isolate and begin treating the cause of the disorder. Thereafter, psychiatric medication is used a secondary step in treatment. Medications include antipsychotic, antidepressant, or sedation-inducing, varying on the patients severity.

== History ==
POS was suggested to be associated with long term and high level solvent exposure in early studies conducted in Scandinavia. These studies found neurological deficits such as personality changes and memory loss were tied to these exposures. However, these studies were highly criticized and found biased, causing doubt in the existence of the syndrome.

Furthermore, various health organizations had difficulty coming to an agreement on the definition of the syndrome. In 1985, the syndrome was defined and provided clear criteria that could be used by patients and medical professionals to help identify the syndrome and isolate ways of prevention.

== Recent research ==
In a 2007 clinical study conducted in Sweden on 128 subjects who had constant high exposure to solvents in their work environments, a definite link to POS was unable to be determined. However, the subject who had diagnosis of POS showed increased neurological symptoms with increased brain atrophy in as little as 3 years of exposure.

== See also ==
- Neurotoxicity
