= NDUFS8 =

Protein-coding gene in the species Homo sapiens

Identifiers
- Aliases: NDUFS8, CI-23k, CI23KD, TYKY, NADH:ubiquinone oxidoreductase core subunit S8, MC1DN2
- External IDs: OMIM: 602141; MGI: 2385079; GeneCards: NDUFS8
Enzyme activity
EC #	BRENDA	ExPASy	KEGG	MetaCyc
7.1.1.2	↗	↗	↗	↗

Gene location (Human)
Chr.	Chromosome 11 (human)
Band	11q13.2	Start	68,030,617 bp
Band	11q13.2	End	68,036,644 bp

Gene location (Mouse)
Chr.	Chromosome 19 (mouse)
Band	19|19 A	Start	3,958,863 bp
Band	19|19 A	End	3,962,774 bp
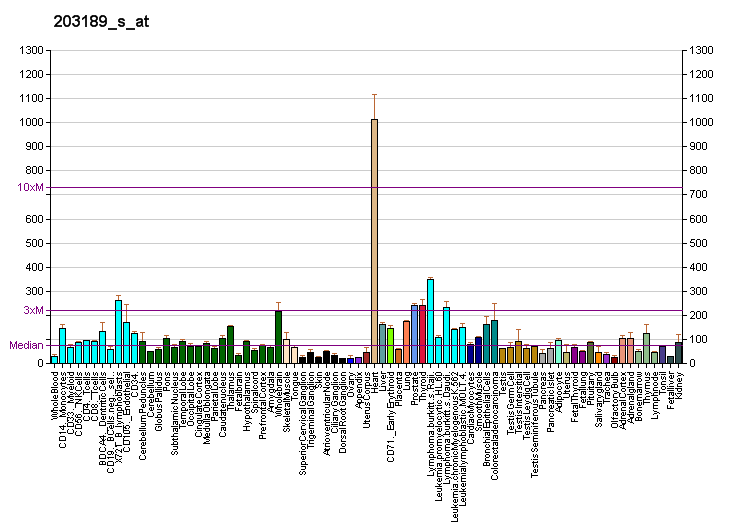

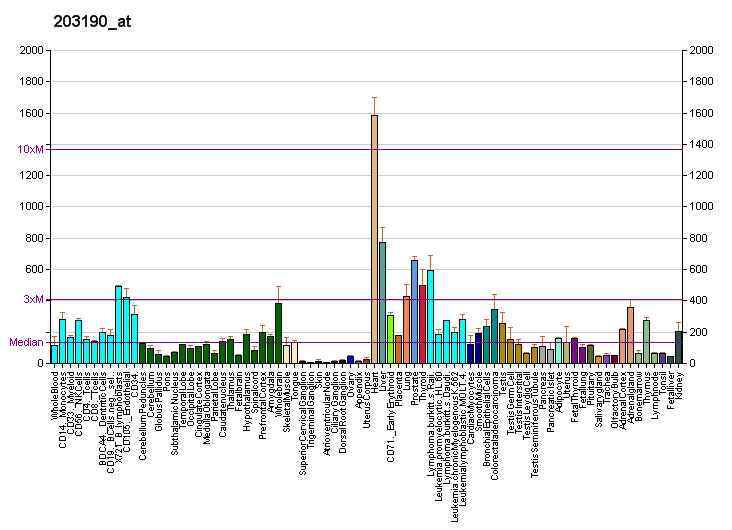
RNA expression pattern
Bgee	Human / Mouse (ortholog); Top expressed in: apex of heart; right adrenal gland; right adrenal cortex; left adrenal gland; left adrenal cortex; muscle of thigh; right auricle of heart; left ventricle; gastrocnemius muscle; mucosa of transverse colon / Top expressed in: interventricular septum; myocardium of ventricle; cardiac muscles; extraocular muscle; soleus muscle; intercostal muscle; medial vestibular nucleus; olfactory epithelium; deep cerebellar nuclei; epithelium of stomach; More reference expression data
BioGPS	More reference expression data
Gene ontology
Molecular function	oxidoreductase activity, acting on NAD(P)H; NADH dehydrogenase (ubiquinone) activity; 4 iron, 4 sulfur cluster binding; oxidoreductase activity; iron-sulfur cluster binding; metal ion binding; NADH dehydrogenase activity
Cellular component	mitochondrial respiratory chain complex I; mitochondrial matrix; respirasome; mitochondrion; membrane
Biological process	response to oxidative stress; mitochondrial respiratory chain complex I assembly; mitochondrial electron transport, NADH to ubiquinone; aerobic dissimilation
Sources:Amigo / QuickGO
Orthologs
Databases	NCBI: entry; OMA: entry
Species	Human	Mouse
Entrez	4728	225887
Ensembl	ENSG00000110717	ENSMUSG00000059734
UniProt	O00217	Q8K3J1
RefSeq (mRNA)	NM_002496	NM_001271443; NM_001271444; NM_144870
RefSeq (protein)	NP_002487	NP_001258372; NP_001258373; NP_659119
Location (UCSC)	Chr 11: 68.03 – 68.04 Mb	Chr 19: 3.96 – 3.96 Mb
PubMed search
- Wikidata
View/Edit Human	View/Edit Mouse

NADH dehydrogenase [ubiquinone] iron-sulfur protein 8, mitochondrial also known as NADH-ubiquinone oxidoreductase 23 kDa subunit, Complex I-23kD (CI-23kD), or TYKY subunit is an enzyme that in humans is encoded by the NDUFS8 gene. The NDUFS8 protein is a subunit of NADH dehydrogenase (ubiquinone) also known as Complex I, which is located in the mitochondrial inner membrane and is the largest of the five complexes of the electron transport chain. Mutations in this gene have been associated with Leigh syndrome.

== Structure ==
NDUFS8 is located on the q arm of chromosome 11 in position 13.2. The NDUFS8 gene produces a 23.7 kDa protein composed of 210 amino acids. The encoded protein, TYKY, contains two 4Fe4S ferredoxin consensus patterns which are believed to be iron-sulfur cluster N-2 binding sites. Studies of other subunits of Complex I have suggested that the subunits TYKY, PSST, 49 kDa, ND1, and ND5 interact with iron-sulfur clusters to form the catalytic core of NADH dehydrogenase (ubiquinone).

== Function ==
This gene encodes a subunit of mitochondrial NADH:ubiquinone oxidoreductase, or Complex I, a multimeric enzyme of the respiratory chain responsible for NADH oxidation, ubiquinone reduction, and the ejection of protons from mitochondria. The encoded protein is involved in the binding of two of the six to eight iron-sulfur clusters of Complex I and, as such, is required in the electron transfer process.

== Clinical significance ==
Mutations in NDUFS8 have been associated with mitochondrial diseases, which can cause any one of a clinically heterogeneous group of disorders arising from dysfunction of the mitochondrial respiratory chain. The phenotypic spectrum ranges from isolated diseases affecting single organs to severe multisystem disorders. Common clinical features include ptosis, external ophthalmoplegia, proximal myopathy and exercise intolerance, cardiomyopathy, sensorineural deafness, optic atrophy, pigmentary retinopathy, encephalopathy, seizures, stroke-like episodes, ataxia, spasticity and lactic acidosis. Mitochondrial disorders can be caused by mutations of mitochondrial DNA or nuclear DNA that either affect oxidative phosphorylation proteins directly, or affect respiratory chain function by impacting the production of the complex machinery needed to run this process.

NDUFS8 mutations have also been associated with Leigh syndrome. Leigh syndrome is an early-onset progressive neurodegenerative disorder characterized by the presence of focal, bilateral lesions in one or more areas of the central nervous system including the brainstem, thalamus, basal ganglia, cerebellum and spinal cord. Clinical features depend on which areas of the central nervous system are involved and include subacute onset of psychomotor retardation, hypotonia, ataxia, weakness, vision loss, eye movement abnormalities, seizures, dysphagia and lactic acidosis. One case report of a pathogenic mutation in NDUFS8 found that it resulted in complex I mitochondrial deficiency and a diagnosis of Leigh syndrome. The patient's symptoms included apnea, cyanosis, hypercarbia, hypotonia, brisk tendon reflexes, ankle clonus, and erratic seizures. Further analysis revealed increased lactate, cerebral lesions, and a hypertrophic obstructive cardiomyopathy.

== Interactions ==
In addition to co-subunits for complex I, NDUFS8 has protein-protein interactions with MLH1 and GEM.
