= Apneustic respirations =

Abnormal breathing pattern

Apneustic respiration (a.k.a. apneusis) is an abnormal pattern of breathing characterized by deep, gasping inspiration with a pause at full inspiration followed by a brief release.

== Presentation ==
Accompanying signs and symptoms may include decerebrate posturing; fixed, dilated pupils; coma or profound stupor; quadriparesis; absent corneal reflex; negative oculocephalic reflex; and obliteration of the gag reflex.

== Causes ==
It is caused by damage to the pons or upper medulla caused by strokes or trauma. Specifically, concurrent removal of input from the vagus nerve and the pneumotaxic center causes this pattern of breathing. It is an ominous sign, with a generally poor prognosis.

It can also be temporarily caused by some drugs, such as ketamine. It causes craniocerebral injury.

== See also ==
- Apneustic center
