= NDUFAF8 =

Protein-coding gene in the species Homo sapiens

Identifiers
- Aliases: NDUFAF8, C17orf89, NADH:ubiquinone oxidoreductase complex assembly factor 8
- External IDs: OMIM: 618461; MGI: 1913676; HomoloGene: 83602; GeneCards: NDUFAF8; OMA:NDUFAF8 - orthologs

Gene location (Mouse)
Chr.	Chromosome 11 (mouse)
Band	11|11 E2	Start	119,989,754 bp
Band	11|11 E2	End	119,991,531 bp
Gene ontology
Molecular function	protein binding
Cellular component	mitochondrion
Biological process	mitochondrial respiratory chain complex I assembly
Sources:Amigo / QuickGO
Orthologs
Species	Human	Mouse
Entrez	284184	208501
Ensembl	ENSG00000224877	ENSMUSG00000078572
UniProt	A1L188	A2AMZ4
RefSeq (mRNA)	NM_001086521	NM_001110242
RefSeq (protein)	NP_001079990; NP_001340331; NP_001340332	NP_001103712
Location (UCSC)	n/a	Chr 11: 119.99 – 119.99 Mb
PubMed search
- Wikidata
View/Edit Human	View/Edit Mouse

NADH:ubiquinone oxidoreductase complex assembly factor 8 is a protein that in humans is encoded by the NDUFAF8 gene. This protein stabilizes NDUFAF5 during assembly of mitochondrial Complex I.

== Structure ==
The NDUFAF8 gene is located on the q arm of chromosome 17 in position 25.3 and spans 1,987 base pairs. The gene produces a 7.756 kDa protein composed of 74 amino acids.

== Function ==
The protein encoded by the NDUFAF8 gene is involved in the assembly of mitochondrial Complex I (NADH-ubiquinone oxidoreductase). This protein is required to stabilize NDUFAF5 during assembly of Complex I.

== Interaction ==
NDUFAF8 has protein-protein interactions with NDUFAF5, stabilizing it.
