= Infectious disease-associated encephalopathy =

Infectious disease-associated encephalopathy (IDAE) is a form of encephalopathy (brain dysfunction) caused by infectious disease. It can be caused by infectious diseases including bacterial, viral, and protozoal infections. In IDAE, systemic inflammation in response to such infections, such as production of pro-inflammatory cytokines, results in neuroinflammation and consequent neurological and cognitive deficits. This can occur even though the pathogen does not necessarily directly infect the central nervous system.

Many different pathogens have been implicated in causing IDAE. These include bacterial infections like Klebsiella pneumoniae, protozoal infections like Plasmodium falciparum (malaria), and viral infections like influenza and SARS-CoV-2 (COVID-19). Post-COVID-19 syndrome (long COVID) may be a post-acute form of IDAE.

The hippocampus and associated processes like memory may be especially vulnerable in IDAE. Neurological and cognitive deficits associated with IDAE can persist for many years after the initial infection has been cleared or may be irreversible. IDAE may be associated with increased risk of neurodegenerative diseases.

A particularly well-known subtype of IDAE is sepsis-associated encephalopathy (SAE).

== Causes ==
The following pathogens, among others, have specifically been implicated in causing IDAE:

- Bacteria
  - Klebsiella pneumoniae
  - Chlamydia pneumoniae
  - Chlamydia psittaci
  - Leptospira spp.
  - Listeria monocytogenes
  - Mycobacterium tuberculosis
  - Mycoplasma pneumoniae
  - Streptococcus pyogenes
  - Other Streptococcus spp.
- Protozoa/parasites
  - Toxoplasma gondii
  - Trypanosoma cruzi
  - Cryptococcus neoformans
  - Cryptococcus gattii
  - Plasmodium falciparum
  - Plasmodium vivax
- Viruses
  - Herpes simplex virus
  - Human herpesvirus
  - Influenza A virus
  - Influenza B virus
  - Human immunodeficiency virus
  - Human T-cell lymphotropic virus
  - Chikungunya virus
  - Cytomegalovirus
  - Dengue virus
  - Rift valley fever virus
  - Varicella zoster virus
  - SARS-CoV-2

== History ==
The term "infectious disease-associated encephalopathy" was first coined in 2021 and this was also when the first literature review of the overarching concept was published. The term "sepsis-associated encephalopathy" was first used by 1990 and this was when the first comprehensive study of this condition was published.

== See also ==
- HIV-associated neurocognitive disorder
- Myalgic encephalomyelitis/chronic fatigue syndrome
- Lyme disease
- Traumatic brain injury
- Cerebral hypoxia
