= Sepsis-associated encephalopathy =

Neurological condition

Sepsis-associated encephalopathy (SAE), also known as sepsis-associated brain dysfunction or septic encephalopathy, is a type of infectious disease-associated encephalopathy (IDAE). It is an umbrella term referring to neurological complications following sepsis. The condition is common but poorly understood. Approximately 70% of people with sepsis experience SAE. The diagnosis of SAE is difficult, with no well-established biomarkers, and it is currently a diagnosis of exclusion based on clinical symptoms. However, electroencephalogram (EEG) may be helpful in aiding diagnosis.

Acute symptoms of SAE can include sickness behavior, lethargy, delirium, cognitive, memory, and attention impairment, depression, anxiety, agitation, motor problems, seizures, and, in severe cases, coma. Post-acute symptoms of SAE can include cognitive and memory deficits and neuromyopathy, among others.

There are currently no well-accepted treatments for the prevention or treatment of SAE symptoms, and treatment is largely symptom-based. In the acute phase, certain medications may aggravate symptoms and may be avoided, such as anticholinergics, antihistamines, sedatives, benzodiazepines, antipsychotics, and anticonvulsants (in those without seizures). Certain medications such as statins, the antidepressant fluoxetine, and resveratrol may reduce neuroinflammation and the acute and long-term symptoms of SAE. However, these findings are based on animal studies, and more research is needed in this area. In addition to the preceding, the serotonin 5-HT_{2} receptor agonist and serotonergic psychedelic 25H-NBOMe has been found to attenuate sepsis-associated depressive-like behavior in rodents, as measured by the forced swim test (FST).

The term "sepsis-associated encephalopathy" was first used by 1990 and this was when the first comprehensive study of this condition was published.

== See also ==
- HIV-associated neurocognitive disorder
- Myalgic encephalomyelitis/chronic fatigue syndrome
- Lyme disease
- Traumatic brain injury
- Cerebral hypoxia
