= Acute necrotizing encephalopathy =

Necrotizing encephalopathy
- Other names: Acute necrotizing encephalitis, Acute necrotizing encephalopathy of childhood (ANEC), infection-induced acute encephalopathy (IIAE), Autosomal dominant acute necrotising encephalopathy (ADANE), Acute Hemorrhagic Necrotizing Encephalopathy
- Specialty: Infectious disease Neurology.
- Symptoms: fever, cough, congestion, vomiting and diarrhea, for several days. After these flu-like symptoms, the affected individuals develop neurological problems, such as seizures, hallucinations, difficulty coordinating movements (ataxia) or abnormal muscle tone.
- Causes: Influenza is the most common virus found in people with acute necrotizing encephalopathy type 1; other viruses that are known to trigger this condition include human herpesvirus 6, coxsackie virus, and enteroviruses. In rare cases, the bacterium Mycoplasma pneumonia is involved.
- Prevention: Vaccination, face coverings, quarantine, physical/social distancing, ventilation, hand washing
- Medication: Steroid and intravenous immunoglobulin (IVIG)
- Prognosis: Approximately one-third of individuals with acute necrotizing encephalopathy type 1 do not survive their illness and subsequent neurological decline. Of those who do survive, about half have permanent brain damage due to tissue necrosis, resulting in impairments in walking, speech, and other basic functions; there may also be permanent brain damage.
- Frequency: At least 59 cases of this condition have been reported in the scientific literature

Acute necrotizing encephalopathy (ANE) or sometimes necrotizing encephalitis or infection-induced acute encephalopathy (IIAE) is a rare type of brain disease (encephalopathy) that occurs following a viral infection. Most commonly, it develops secondary to infection with influenza A, influenza B, and the human herpes virus 6. Dengue related ANE (DANE) is commonly seen and due to direct invasion and cytokine storm causing bilateral thalamic hemorrhages. ANE can be familial or sporadic, but both forms are very similar to each other. Multiple subtypes, associated with specific genes, have been found.

== Signs and symptoms ==
Acute necrotizing encephalopathy typically appears in infancy or early childhood, although some people do not develop the condition until adolescence or adulthood. People with this condition usually exhibit symptoms of an infection, such as fever, cough, congestion, vomiting, and diarrhea, for a few days. Following these flu-like symptoms, affected individuals develop neurological problems, such as seizures, hallucinations, difficulty coordinating movements (ataxia), or abnormal muscle tone. Eventually, most affected individuals go into a coma, which usually lasts for several weeks. The condition is described as "acute" because the episodes of illness are time-limited.

People with acute necrotizing encephalopathy develop areas of damage (lesions) in certain regions of the brain. As the condition progresses, these brain regions develop swelling (edema), bleeding (hemorrhage), and then tissue death (necrosis). The progressive brain damage and tissue loss result in encephalopathy.

== Genetics ==
ANE can be familial or sporadic, but both forms are very similar to each other. Most familial cases are caused by genetic changes in the RANBP2 gene, and are known as infection-induced acute encephalopathy 3 (IIAE3) or acute necrotizing encephalopathy type 1 (ANE1).

In addition there is acute infection-induced (herpes-specific) encephalopathy-1 (IIAE1) associated with a homozygous UNC93B1 gene; and herpes-specific IIAE2 associated with the TLR3 gene; as well as IIAE4, associated with the CPT2 gene; herpes-specific IIAE5 associated with the TRAF3 gene; herpes-specific IIAE6 associated with the TICAM1 gene; herpes-specific IIAE7 associated with the IRF3 gene; herpes-specific IIAE8 associated with the TBK1 gene; IIAE9 associated with the NUP214 gene; herpes-specific IIAE10 associated with the SNORA31 gene; and herpes-specific IIAE11 associated with the DBR1 gene.

== Diagnosis ==
The diagnosis of acute necrotizing encephalopathy is done using neuroimaging such as magnetic resonance imaging, electroencephalography findings, and changes to the cerebrospinal fluid.

== Treatment ==
Randomized clinical trials have not been published, and optimal treatment regimes for the condition are not known. Suggested treatments may be corticosteroids and cytokine regulators such as TNF inhibitors.

== Prognosis ==
Approximately one-third of individuals with acute necrotizing encephalopathy do not survive their illness and subsequent neurological decline. Of those who do survive, about half have permanent brain damage due to tissue necrosis, resulting in impairments in walking, speech, and other basic functions. Over time, many of these skills may be regained, but the loss of brain tissue is permanent. Other individuals who survive their illness appear to recover completely.

It is estimated that half of individuals with acute necrotizing encephalopathy are susceptible to recurrent episodes and will have another infection that results in neurological decline; some people may have numerous episodes throughout their lives. Neurological function worsens following each episode as more brain tissue is damaged.

== History ==
The first case in the medical literature was described in 1955 by Belgian neurologist Ludo van Bogaert. A sharp increase in cases during the 2024-2025 United States influenza season was flagged by ProMED on February 6, 2025.
