= DMAC1 =

Protein-coding gene in humans

Identifiers
- Aliases: DMAC1, C9orf123, TMEM261, transmembrane protein 261, distal membrane arm assembly complex 1, distal membrane arm assembly component 1
- External IDs: OMIM: 617261; MGI: 1914178; GeneCards: DMAC1

Gene location (Human)
Chr.	Chromosome 9 (human)
Band	9p24.1	Start	7,796,500 bp
Band	9p24.1	End	7,888,380 bp

Gene location (Mouse)
Chr.	Chromosome 4 (mouse)
Band	4|4 C3	Start	75,195,591 bp
Band	4|4 C3	End	75,196,542 bp
RNA expression pattern
Bgee	Human / Mouse (ortholog); Top expressed in: myocardium of left ventricle; cardiac muscle tissue of right atrium; tibialis anterior muscle; mucosa of ileum; right ventricle; quadriceps femoris muscle; vastus lateralis muscle; deltoid muscle; apex of heart; biceps brachii / Top expressed in: interventricular septum; endocardial cushion; superior cervical ganglion; internal carotid artery; external carotid artery; fetal liver hematopoietic progenitor cell; atrioventricular valve; dermis; mandibular prominence; maxillary prominence; More reference expression data
BioGPS	n/a
Orthologs
Databases	NCBI: entry; OMA: entry
Species	Human	Mouse
Entrez	90871	66928
Ensembl	ENSG00000137038	ENSMUSG00000028398
UniProt	Q96GE9	Q9CQ00
RefSeq (mRNA)	NM_033428; NM_001318058; NM_001318059	NM_025849
RefSeq (protein)	NP_001304987; NP_001304988; NP_219500	NP_080125
Location (UCSC)	Chr 9: 7.8 – 7.89 Mb	Chr 4: 75.2 – 75.2 Mb
PubMed search
- Wikidata
View/Edit Human	View/Edit Mouse

Distal membrane-arm assembly complex protein 1 is a protein that in humans is encoded by the DMAC1 gene (previously TMEM261). TMEM261 is also known as C9ORF123 and DMAC1, Chromosome 9 Open Reading Frame 123 and Transmembrane Protein C9orf123 and Distal membrane-arm assembly complex protein 1.

== Gene features ==
TMEM261 is located at 9p24.1, its length is 91,891 base pairs (bp) on the reverse strand. Its neighbouring gene is PTPRD located at 9p23-p24.3 also on the reverse strand and encodes protein tyrosine phosphatase receptor type delta. TMEM261 has 2 exons and 1 intron, and 6 primary transcript variants; the largest mRNA transcript variant consisting of 742bp with a protein 129 amino acids (aa) in length and 13,500 daltons (Da) in size, and the smallest coding transcript variant being 381bp with a protein 69aa long and 6,100 Da in size.

Annotated features of TMEM261 protein including topology and important sites for phosphorylation and Myristoylation as well DUF4536 and transmembrane helical domains.

== Protein features ==
TMEM261 is a protein consisting out of 112 amino acids, with a molecular weight of 11.8 kDa. The isoelectric point is predicted to be 10.2, whilst its posttranslational modification value is 9.9.

=== Structure ===
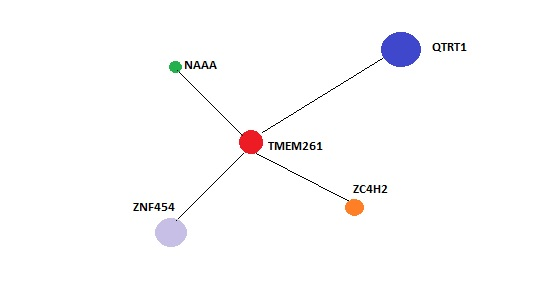
Some proteins found to interact with TMEM261

TMEM261 contains a domain of unknown function, DUF4536 (pfam15055), predicted as a helical membrane spanning domain about 45aa (Cys 47- Ser 92) in length with no known domain relationships. Two further transmembrane helical domains are predicted of lengths 18aa (Val 52-Ala 69) and 23aa (Pro 81-Ala 102]). There is also a low complexity region spanning 25aa (Thr 14-Ala 39). The tertiary structure for TMEM261 has not yet been determined. However, its protein secondary structure is mostly composed of coiled-coil regions with beta strands and alpha helices found within the transmembrane and domain of unknown function regions. The N-terminal region of TMEM261 is composed of a disordered region which contains the low complexity region that is not highly conserved amongst orthologues.

=== Modifications ===
A N-myristoylation domain is shown to be present in most TMEM261 protein variants. Post-translational modifications include myristoylation of the N-terminal Glycine residue (Gly2) of the TMEM261 protein as well as phosphorylation of Threonine 31.

=== Interactions ===
Proteins shown to interact with TMEM261 include NAAA (protein-protein interaction), QTRT1 (RNA-protein interaction),ZC4H2(DNA-protein interaction) and ZNF454(DNA-protein interaction). It has also shown to interact with APP(protein-protein interaction), ARHGEF38(protein-protein interaction) and HNRNPD(RNA-protein interaction).

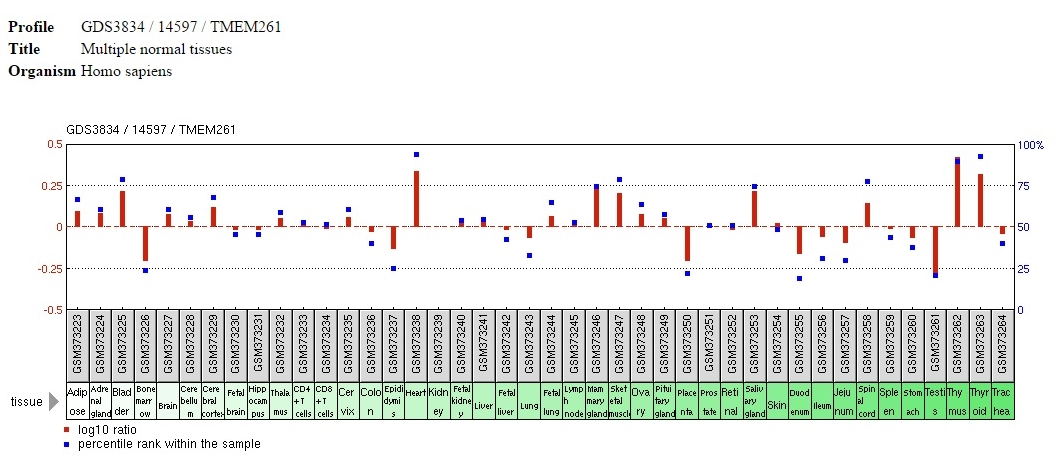
Tissue expression of TMEM261 showing tissue enriched gene (TEG) expression

Additional transcription factor binding sites (DNA-protein interaction) predicted include one binding site for MEF2C a monocyte-specific enhancement factor that is involved in muscle-cell regulation particularly in the cardiovascular system and two binding sites for GATA1 which is a globin transcription factor 1 involved in erythroblast development regulation.

== Expression ==
TMEM261 shows ubiquitous expression in humans and is detected in almost all tissue types. It shows tissue-enriched gene (TEG) expression when compared to housekeeping gene (HKG) expression. Its highest expression is seen in the heart (overall relative expression 94%) particularly in heart fibroblast cells, thymus (overall relative expression 90%), and thyroid (overall relative expression 93%) particularly in thyroid glandular cells. Staining intensity of cancer cells showed intermediate to high expression in breast, colorectal, ovarian, skin, urothelial, head and neck cells.

== Function ==
Currently the function for TMEM261 is unknown. However, gene amplification and rearrangements of its locus have been associated with various cancers including colorectal cancer, breast cancer and lymphomas.

== Evolution ==
=== Orthologues ===
The orthologues and homologues of TMEM261 are limited to vertebrates, its oldest homologue dates to that of the cartilaginous fishes which diverged from Homo sapiens 462.5 million years ago. The protein primary structure of TMEM261 shows higher overall conservation in mammals, however high conservation of the domain of unknown function (DUF4536) to the C-terminus region is seen in all orthologues, including distant homologues. The protein structure of TMEM261 shows conservation across most orthologues.

Organism	Scientific name	Accession number	Date of Divergence from Humans (million years)	Amino acids (aa)	Identity (%)	Class
Humans	Homo sapiens	NP_219500.1	0	112	100	Mammalia
Gorilla	Gorilla gorilla	XP_004047847.1	8.8	112	99	Mammalia
Olive baboon	Papio anubis	XP_003911767.1	29	112	84	Mammalia
Sunda flying lemur	Galeopterus variegatus	XP_008587957.1	81.5	112	68	Mammalia
Lesser Egyptian jerboa	Jaculus Jaculus	XP_004653029.1	92.3	109	56	Mammalia
Naked mole rat	Heterocephalus glaber	XP_004898193.1	92.3	114	45	Mammalia
White rhinoceros	Ceratotherium simum simum	XP_004436891.1	94.2	112	66	Mammalia
Nine-banded armadillo	Dasypus novemcinctus	XP_004459147.1	104.4	112	59	Mammalia
Green sea turtle	Chelonia mydas	XP_007056940.1	296	85	49	Reptilia
Zebra finch	Taeniopygia Guttata	XP_002187613.2	296	72	47	Aves
Western clawed frog	Xenopus tropicalis	XP_002943025.1	371.2	85	45	Amphibia
Haplochromis burtoni	Haplochromis burtoni	XP_005928614.1	400.1	91	51	Actinopterygii
Australian ghost shark	Callorhinchus milii	XP_007884223.1	426.5	86	43	Chondrichthyes

=== Paralogues ===
TMEM261 has no known paralogs.
