= NDUFA5 =

Protein-coding gene in the species Homo sapiens

Identifiers
- Aliases: NDUFA5, B13, CI-13KD-B, CI-13kB, NUFM, UQOR13, NADH:ubiquinone oxidoreductase subunit A5
- External IDs: OMIM: 601677; MGI: 1915452; GeneCards: NDUFA5

Gene location (Human)
Chr.	Chromosome 7 (human)
Band	7q31.32	Start	123,536,997 bp
Band	7q31.32	End	123,557,904 bp

Gene location (Mouse)
Chr.	Chromosome 6 (mouse)
Band	6|6 A3.1	Start	24,518,665 bp
Band	6|6 A3.1	End	24,528,012 bp
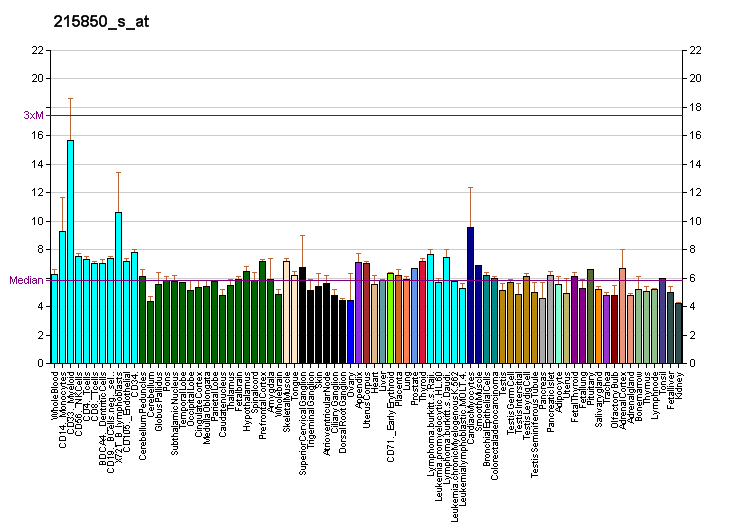

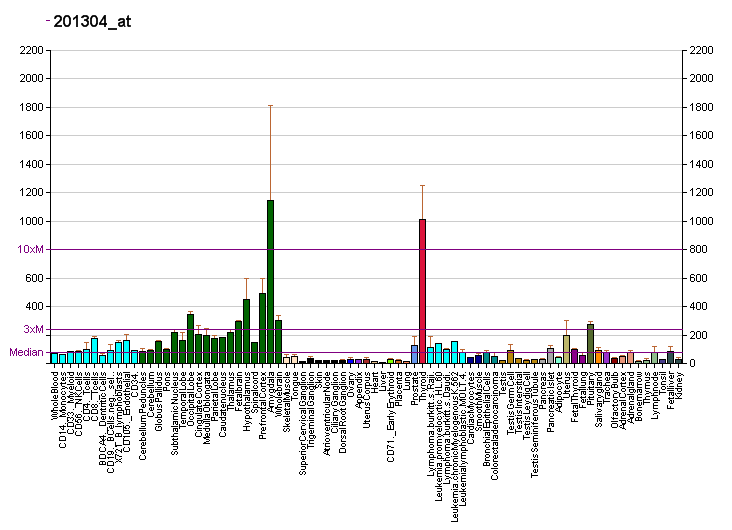
RNA expression pattern
Bgee	Human / Mouse (ortholog); Top expressed in: endothelial cell; Skeletal muscle tissue of rectus abdominis; right ventricle; biceps brachii; Skeletal muscle tissue of biceps brachii; Achilles tendon; dorsolateral prefrontal cortex; germinal epithelium; right auricle of heart; Brodmann area 9 / Top expressed in: aortic valve; facial motor nucleus; cardiac muscle tissue of left ventricle; ascending aorta; interventricular septum; extraocular muscle; intercostal muscle; masseter muscle; Ileal epithelium; plantaris muscle; More reference expression data
BioGPS	More reference expression data
Gene ontology
Molecular function	oxidoreductase activity, acting on NAD(P)H; NADH dehydrogenase (ubiquinone) activity; protein binding
Cellular component	mitochondrial inner membrane; mitochondrial respiratory chain complex I; respirasome; respiratory chain complex I; membrane; mitochondrion; protein-containing complex
Biological process	mitochondrial electron transport, NADH to ubiquinone; respiratory electron transport chain; mitochondrial respiratory chain complex I assembly
Sources:Amigo / QuickGO
Orthologs
Databases	NCBI: entry; OMA: entry
Species	Human	Mouse
Entrez	4698	68202
Ensembl	ENSG00000128609	ENSMUSG00000023089
UniProt	Q16718	Q9CPP6
RefSeq (mRNA)	NM_001282419; NM_001282420; NM_001282421; NM_001282422; NM_001291304 NM_005000	NM_026614; NM_001311068
RefSeq (protein)	NP_001269348; NP_001269349; NP_001269350; NP_001269351; NP_001278233 NP_004991	NP_001297997; NP_080890
Location (UCSC)	Chr 7: 123.54 – 123.56 Mb	Chr 6: 24.52 – 24.53 Mb
PubMed search
- Wikidata
View/Edit Human	View/Edit Mouse

NADH dehydrogenase [ubiquinone] 1 alpha subcomplex subunit 5 is an enzyme that in humans is encoded by the NDUFA5 gene. The NDUFA5 protein is a subunit of NADH dehydrogenase (ubiquinone), which is located in the mitochondrial inner membrane and is the largest of the five complexes of the electron transport chain.

== Structure ==
The NDUFA5 gene is located on the q arm of chromosome 7 and it spans 64,655 base pairs. The gene produces a 13.5 kDa protein composed of 116 amino acids. NDUFA5 is a subunit of the enzyme NADH dehydrogenase (ubiquinone), the largest of the respiratory complexes. The structure is L-shaped with a long, hydrophobic transmembrane domain and a hydrophilic domain for the peripheral arm that includes all the known redox centers and the NADH binding site. It has been noted that the N-terminal hydrophobic domain has the potential to be folded into an alpha helix spanning the inner mitochondrial membrane with a C-terminal hydrophilic domain interacting with globular subunits of Complex I. The highly conserved two-domain structure suggests that this feature is critical for the protein function and that the hydrophobic domain acts as an anchor for the NADH dehydrogenase (ubiquinone) complex at the inner mitochondrial membrane. NDUFA5 is one of about 31 hydrophobic subunits that form the transmembrane region of Complex I. The protein localizes to the inner mitochondrial membrane as part of the 7 component-containing, water-soluble iron-sulfur protein (IP) fraction of complex I, although its specific role is unknown. It is assumed to undergo post-translational removal of the initiator methionine and N-acetylation of the next amino acid. The predicted secondary structure is primarily alpha helix, but the carboxy-terminal half of the protein has high potential to adopt a coiled-coil form. The amino-terminal part contains a putative beta sheet rich in hydrophobic amino acids that may serve as mitochondrial import signal. Related pseudogenes have also been identified on four other chromosomes.

== Function ==
The human NDUFA5 gene codes for the B13 subunit of complex I of the respiratory chain, which transfers electrons from NADH to ubiquinone. The NDUFA5 protein localizes to the mitochondrial inner membrane and it is thought to aid in this transfer of electrons. Initially, NADH binds to Complex I and transfers two electrons to the isoalloxazine ring of the flavin mononucleotide (FMN) prosthetic arm to form FMNH_{2}. The electrons are transferred through a series of iron-sulfur (Fe-S) clusters in the prosthetic arm and finally to coenzyme Q10 (CoQ), which is reduced to ubiquinol (CoQH_{2}). The flow of electrons changes the redox state of the protein, resulting in a conformational change and pK shift of the ionizable side chain, which pumps four hydrogen ions out of the mitochondrial matrix. The high degree of conservation of NDUFA5 extending to plants and fungi indicates its functional significance in the enzyme complex.

== Clinical significance ==
NDUFA5, ATP5F1A and ATP5MC3 all show consistently reduced expression in brains of autism patients. Mitochondrial dysfunction and impaired ATP synthesis can result in oxidative stress, which may play a role in the development of autism.

== Interactions ==
NDUFA5 has many protein-protein interactions, such as ubiquitin C and with members of the NADH dehydrogenase [ubiquinone] 1 beta subcomplex, including NDUFB1, NDUFB9 and NDUFB10.
