= Jactitation (medicine) =

Restless tossing in bed

In medicine, jactitation (sometimes jactation) is a restless tossing in bed, seen in severe fevers and certain mental disorders; or more generally a tossing to and fro or jerking and twitching of the body. It derives ultimately from the Latin jactitare, to toss about.
