= NDUFB10 =

Protein-coding gene in the species Homo sapiens

Identifiers
- Aliases: NDUFB10, PDSW, NADH:ubiquinone oxidoreductase subunit B10, MC1DN35
- External IDs: OMIM: 603843; MGI: 1915592; GeneCards: NDUFB10

Gene location (Human)
Chr.	Chromosome 16 (human)
Band	16p13.3	Start	1,959,538 bp
Band	16p13.3	End	1,961,975 bp

Gene location (Mouse)
Chr.	Chromosome 17 (mouse)
Band	17|17 A3.3	Start	24,941,034 bp
Band	17|17 A3.3	End	24,943,452 bp
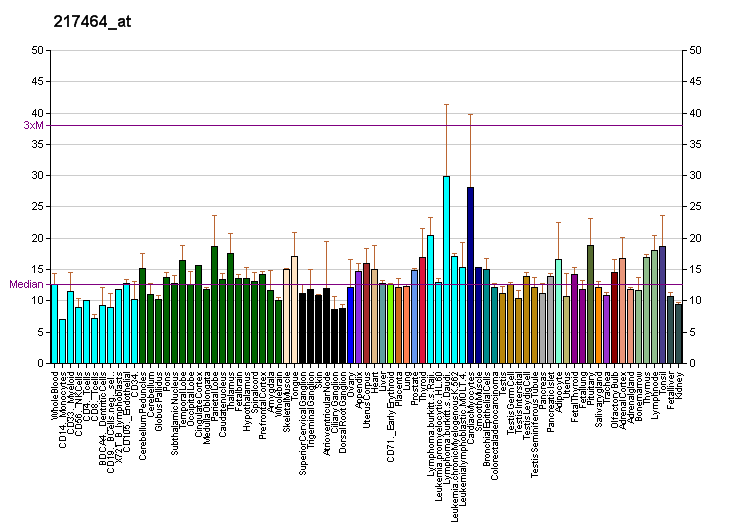
RNA expression pattern
Bgee	Human / Mouse (ortholog); Top expressed in: myocardium of left ventricle; cardiac muscle tissue of right atrium; muscle of thigh; tibialis anterior muscle; quadriceps femoris muscle; apex of heart; vastus lateralis muscle; gastrocnemius muscle; right ventricle; Skeletal muscle tissue of rectus abdominis / Top expressed in: interventricular septum; myocardium of ventricle; cardiac muscle tissue of left ventricle; intercostal muscle; thoracic diaphragm; plantaris muscle; extraocular muscle; soleus muscle; digastric muscle; medial vestibular nucleus; More reference expression data
BioGPS	More reference expression data
Gene ontology
Molecular function	protein binding; NADH dehydrogenase (ubiquinone) activity
Cellular component	mitochondrial respiratory chain complex I; mitochondrion; respirasome; mitochondrial inner membrane; membrane
Biological process	mitochondrial electron transport, NADH to ubiquinone; mitochondrial respiratory chain complex I assembly
Sources:Amigo / QuickGO
Orthologs
Databases	NCBI: entry; OMA: entry
Species	Human	Mouse
Entrez	4716	68342
Ensembl	ENSG00000140990	ENSMUSG00000040048
UniProt	O96000	Q9DCS9
RefSeq (mRNA)	NM_004548	NM_026684
RefSeq (protein)	NP_004539	NP_080960
Location (UCSC)	Chr 16: 1.96 – 1.96 Mb	Chr 17: 24.94 – 24.94 Mb
PubMed search
- Wikidata
View/Edit Human	View/Edit Mouse

NADH dehydrogenase [ubiquinone] 1 beta subcomplex subunit 10 is an enzyme that in humans is encoded by the NDUFB10 gene. NADH dehydrogenase (ubiquinone) 1 beta subcomplex subunit 10 is an accessory subunit of the NADH dehydrogenase (ubiquinone) complex, located in the mitochondrial inner membrane. It is also known as Complex I and is the largest of the five complexes of the electron transport chain.

== Gene ==
The NDUFB10 gene is located on the p arm of chromosome 16 in position 13.3 and is 2,459 base pairs long.

== Structure ==
The NDUFB10 protein weighs 21 kDa and is composed of 172 amino acids. NDUFB10 is a subunit of the enzyme NADH dehydrogenase (ubiquinone), the largest of the respiratory complexes. The structure is L-shaped with a long, hydrophobic transmembrane domain and a hydrophilic domain for the peripheral arm that includes all the known redox centers and the NADH binding site. It has been noted that the N-terminal hydrophobic domain has the potential to be folded into an alpha helix spanning the inner mitochondrial membrane with a C-terminal hydrophilic domain interacting with globular subunits of Complex I. The highly conserved two-domain structure suggests that this feature is critical for the protein function and that the hydrophobic domain acts as an anchor for the NADH dehydrogenase (ubiquinone) complex at the inner mitochondrial membrane.

== Function ==
The protein encoded by this gene is an accessory subunit of the multisubunit NADH:ubiquinone oxidoreductase (complex I) that is not directly involved in catalysis. Mammalian complex I is composed of 45 different subunits. It locates at the mitochondrial inner membrane. This protein complex has NADH dehydrogenase activity and oxidoreductase activity. It transfers electrons from NADH to the respiratory chain. The immediate electron acceptor for the enzyme is believed to be ubiquinone. Alternative splicing occurs at this locus and two transcript variants encoding distinct isoforms have been identified. Initially, NADH binds to Complex I and transfers two electrons to the isoalloxazine ring of the flavin mononucleotide (FMN) prosthetic arm to form FMNH_{2}. The electrons are transferred through a series of iron-sulfur (Fe-S) clusters in the prosthetic arm and finally to coenzyme Q10 (CoQ), which is reduced to ubiquinol (CoQH_{2}). The flow of electrons changes the redox state of the protein, resulting in a conformational change and pK shift of the ionizable side chain, which pumps four hydrogen ions out of the mitochondrial matrix.
