= Dimethylglycine dehydrogenase =

Class of enzymes

DMGDH

Identifiers
- Aliases: DMGDH, DMGDHD, ME2GLYDH, dimethylglycine dehydrogenase
- External IDs: OMIM: 605849; MGI: 1921379; GeneCards: DMGDH
Enzyme activity
EC #	BRENDA	ExPASy	KEGG	MetaCyc
1.5.8.4	↗	↗	↗	↗

Gene location (Human)
Chr.	Chromosome 5 (human)
Band	5q14.1	Start	78,997,564 bp
Band	5q14.1	End	79,236,038 bp

Gene location (Mouse)
Chr.	Chromosome 13 (mouse)
Band	13|13 C3	Start	93,810,941 bp
Band	13|13 C3	End	93,889,341 bp
RNA expression pattern
Bgee	Human / Mouse (ortholog); Top expressed in: right lobe of liver; renal cortex; human kidney; testicle; renal medulla; right adrenal cortex; left adrenal gland; oocyte; left adrenal cortex; caput epididymis / Top expressed in: left lobe of liver; proximal tubule; right kidney; human kidney; gallbladder; morula; morula; transitional epithelium of urinary bladder; vestibular membrane of cochlear duct; tail of embryo; More reference expression data
BioGPS	n/a
Gene ontology
Molecular function	electron transfer activity; oxidoreductase activity; dimethylglycine dehydrogenase activity; RNA binding
Cellular component	mitochondrion; mitochondrial matrix; cytoplasm
Biological process	amino-acid betaine catabolic process; choline metabolic process; choline catabolic process; electron transport chain
Sources:Amigo / QuickGO
Orthologs
Databases	NCBI: entry; OMA: entry
Species	Human	Mouse
Entrez	29958	74129
Ensembl	ENSG00000132837	ENSMUSG00000042102
UniProt	Q9UI17	Q9DBT9
RefSeq (mRNA)	NM_013391	NM_028772
RefSeq (protein)	NP_037523	NP_083048
Location (UCSC)	Chr 5: 79 – 79.24 Mb	Chr 13: 93.81 – 93.89 Mb
PubMed search
- Wikidata
View/Edit Human	View/Edit Mouse

Dimethylglycine dehydrogenase

Identifiers
- EC no.: 1.5.8.4
- CAS no.: 37256-30-7

Databases
- BRENDA: enzyme data
- ExPASy: NiceZyme view
- KEGG: enzyme entry
- MetaCyc: metabolic pathway
- Rhea: reactions
- PDB structures: RCSB PDB PDBe PDBsum
- Gene Ontology: AmiGO / QuickGO
Search
- PMC: articles
- PubMed: articles
- NCBI: proteins

Dimethylglycine dehydrogenase (EC 1.5.8.4) is an enzyme that in humans is encoded by the DMGDH gene. It catalyzes the chemical reaction

dimethylglycine
+ electron-transferring
flavoprotein
H_{2}O
H_{2}O
sarcosine
+ H_{2}C=O
+ reduced
flavoprotein

The three substrates of this enzyme are dimethylglycine, water, and an electron-transferring flavoprotein. Its products are sarcosine, formaldehyde, and the reduced flavoprotein.

This enzyme belongs to the family of oxidoreductases, specifically those acting on the CH-NH group of donors with other acceptors. The systematic name of this enzyme class is N,N-dimethylglycine:acceptor oxidoreductase (demethylating). Other names in common use include N,N-dimethylglycine oxidase, and N,N-dimethylglycine:(acceptor) oxidoreductase (demethylating). This enzyme participates in glycine and threonine metabolism. It employs one cofactor, flavin adenine dinucleotide.
