= Sa Thầy =

Sa Thầy Xã Sa Thầy
- Commune
- Sa Thầy commune
- Location within Vietnam
- Coordinates: 14°24′29″N 107°47′50″E
- Country: Vietnam
- Region: Central Highlands
- Province: Quảng Ngãi
- Time zone: UTC+7 (UTC + 7)

Sa Thầy is a commune (xã) of Quảng Ngãi Province, Vietnam.
