= Encephalopathy =

Disorders or diseases of the brain

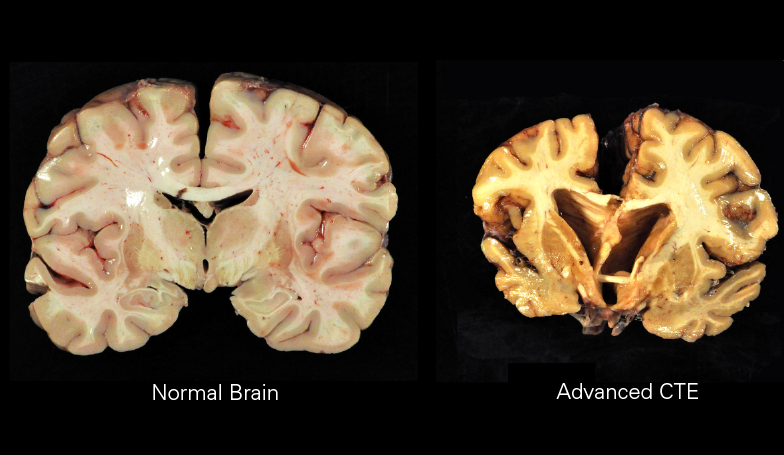
- Chronic traumatic encephalopathy
- Specialty: Neurology
- Symptoms: Altered mental state, attention, orientation, sleep–wake cycle and consciousness
- Causes: Chemotherapy medication, brain injury, chronic infections, strokes, brain tumors, celiac disease or non-celiac gluten sensitivity.
- Diagnostic method: Blood tests, cerebrospinal fluid, brain imaging studies, electroencephalography (EEG), neuropsychological testing
- Treatment: Anticonvulsants, sympathomimetic drugs, changes to diet and nutritional supplements (e.g. gluten-free diet)

Encephalopathy (/ɛnˌsɛfəˈlɒpəθi/; from Ancient Greek ἐγκέφαλος (enképhalos) 'brain' and πάθος (páthos) 'suffering') is any disorder or disease of the brain, especially chronic degenerative conditions. In modern usage, encephalopathy does not refer to a single disease, but rather to a syndrome of overall brain dysfunction; this syndrome has many possible organic and inorganic causes.

== Types ==
There are many types of encephalopathy. Some examples include:

- Mitochondrial encephalopathy: Metabolic disorder caused by dysfunction of mitochondrial DNA. Can affect many body systems, particularly the brain and nervous system.
- Acute necrotizing encephalopathy, rare disease that occurs following a viral infection.
- Glycine encephalopathy: A genetic metabolic disorder involving excess production of glycine.
- Hepatic encephalopathy: Arising from advanced cirrhosis of the liver.
- Hypoxic ischemic encephalopathy: Permanent or transitory encephalopathy arising from severely reduced oxygen delivery to the brain.
- Static encephalopathy: Unchanging, or permanent, brain damage, usually caused by prenatal exposure to ethanol.
- Uremic encephalopathy: Arising from high levels of toxins normally cleared by the kidneys—rare where dialysis is readily available.
- Wernicke's encephalopathy: Arising from thiamine (B_{1}) deficiency, usually in the setting of alcoholism.
- Hashimoto's encephalopathy: Arising from an auto-immune disorder.
- Anti-NMDA receptor encephalitis: An auto-immune encephalitis.
- Hyperammonemia: A condition caused by high levels of ammonia, which is due to inborn errors of metabolism (including urea cycle disorder or multiple carboxylase deficiency), a diet with excessive levels of protein, deficiencies of specific nutrients such as arginine or biotin, or organ failure.
- Hypertensive encephalopathy: Arising from acutely increased blood pressure.
- Chronic traumatic encephalopathy: A progressive degenerative disease associated with repeated head trauma, often linked to contact sports.
- Lyme encephalopathy: Arising from Lyme disease bacteria, including Borrelia burgdorferi.
- Toxic encephalopathy: A form of encephalopathy caused by chemicals and prescription drugs, often resulting in permanent brain damage.
- Toxic-metabolic encephalopathy: A catch-all for brain dysfunction caused by infection, organ failure, or intoxication.
- Transmissible spongiform encephalopathy: A collection of diseases all caused by prions, and characterized by "spongy" brain tissue (riddled with holes), impaired locomotion or coordination, and a 100% mortality rate. Includes bovine spongiform encephalopathy (mad cow disease), scrapie, and kuru among others.
- Neonatal encephalopathy (hypoxic-ischemic encephalopathy): An obstetric form, often occurring due to lack of oxygen in bloodflow to brain-tissue of the fetus during labour or delivery.
- Salmonella encephalopathy: A form of encephalopathy caused by food poisoning (especially out of peanuts and rotten meat) often resulting in permanent brain damage and nervous system disorders.
- Encephalomyopathy: A combination of encephalopathy and myopathy. Causes may include mitochondrial disease (particularly MELAS) or chronic hypophosphatemia, as may occur in cystinosis.
- Creutzfeldt–Jakob disease (CJD; transmissible spongiform encephalopathy).
- Aicardi–Goutières syndrome, a hereditary disease caused by mutations in the TREX1, RNASEH2B, RNASEH2C, RNASEH2A, ADAR1, SAMHD1, IFIH1, LSM11, or RNU7-1 gene.
- Infectious disease-associated encephalopathy (an umbrella term for encephalopathy related to infectious disease, not necessarily directly infecting the central nervous system)
- HIV encephalopathy (encephalopathy associated with HIV infection and AIDS, characterized by atrophy and ill-defined white matter hyperintensity).
- Sepsis-associated encephalopathy (this type can occur in the setting of apparent sepsis, trauma, severe burns, or trauma, even without clear identification of an infection).
- Epileptic encephalopathies:
  - Early infantile epileptic encephalopathy (acquired or congenital abnormal cortical development).
  - Early myoclonic epileptic encephalopathy (possibly due to metabolic disorders).
- Gluten encephalopathy: Focal abnormalities of the white matter (generally area of low perfusion) are appreciated through magnetic resonance. Migraine is the most common symptom reported.
- BRAT1 Encephalopathy: An ultra-rare autosomal recessive neonatal encephalopathy.
- Limbic-predominant age-related TDP-43 encephalopathy(LATE) is a neurodegenerative disease and type of dementia that is caused by misfolded TDP-43 proteins. The disorder typically affects >80 year olds.

=== Toxicity from chemotherapy ===
Chemotherapy medication, for example, fludarabine can cause a permanent severe global encephalopathy. Ifosfamide can cause a severe encephalopathy (but it can be reversible with stopping use of the drug and starting the use of methylene blue). Bevacizumab and other anti–vascular endothelial growth factor medication can cause posterior reversible encephalopathy syndrome.

== Signs and symptoms ==
The hallmark of encephalopathy is an altered mental state or delirium. Characteristic of the altered mental state is impairment of the cognition, attention, orientation, sleep–wake cycle and consciousness. An altered state of consciousness may range from failure of selective attention to drowsiness. Hypervigilance may be present; with or without: cognitive deficits, headache, epileptic seizures, myoclonus (involuntary twitching of a muscle or group of muscles) or asterixis ("flapping tremor" of the hand when wrist is extended).

Depending on the type and severity of encephalopathy, common neurological symptoms are loss of cognitive function, subtle personality changes, and an inability to concentrate. Other neurological signs may include dysarthria, hypomimia, problems with movements (they can be clumsy or slow), ataxia, tremor. Other neurological signs may include involuntary grasping and sucking motions, nystagmus (rapid, involuntary eye movement), jactitation (restlessness while in bed), and respiratory abnormalities such as Cheyne-Stokes respiration (cyclic waxing and waning of tidal volume), apneustic respirations and post-hypercapnic apnea. Focal neurological deficits are less common.

Wernicke encephalopathy can co-occur with Korsakoff alcoholic syndrome, characterized by amnestic-confabulatory syndrome: retrograde amnesia, anterograde amnesia, confabulations (invented memories), poor recall and disorientation.

Anti-NMDA receptor encephalitis is the most common autoimmune encephalitis. It can cause paranoid and grandiose delusions, agitation, hallucinations (visual and auditory), bizarre behavior, fear, short-term memory loss, and confusion.

HIV encephalopathy can lead to dementia.

== Diagnosis ==
Blood tests, cerebrospinal fluid examination by lumbar puncture (also known as spinal tap), brain imaging studies, electroencephalography (EEG), neuropsychological testing and similar diagnostic studies may be used to differentiate the various causes of encephalopathy.

Diagnosis is frequently clinical. That is, no set of tests give the diagnosis, but the entire presentation of the illness with nonspecific test results informs the experienced clinician of the diagnosis.

== Treatment ==
Treatment varies according to the type and severity of the encephalopathy. Anticonvulsants may be prescribed to reduce or halt any seizures. Changes to diet and nutritional supplements may help some people. In severe cases, dialysis or organ replacement surgery may be needed.

Sympathomimetic drugs can increase motivation, cognition, motor performance and alertness in persons with encephalopathy caused by brain injury, chronic infections, strokes, brain tumors.

When the encephalopathy is caused by untreated celiac disease or non-celiac gluten sensitivity, the gluten-free diet stops the progression of brain damage and improves the headaches.

== Prognosis ==
Treating the underlying cause of the disorder may improve or reverse symptoms. However, in some cases, the encephalopathy may cause permanent structural changes and irreversible damage to the brain. These permanent deficits can be considered a form of stable dementia. Some encephalopathies can be fatal.

== Terminology ==
Encephalopathy is a difficult term because it can be used to denote either a disease or finding (i.e., an observable sign in a person).

When referring to a finding, encephalopathy refers to permanent (or degenerative) brain injury, or a reversible one. It can be due to direct injury to the brain, or illness remote from the brain. The individual findings that cause a clinician to refer to a person as having encephalopathy include intellectual disability, irritability, agitation, delirium, confusion, somnolence, stupor, coma and psychosis. As such, describing a person as having a clinical picture of encephalopathy is not a very specific description.

When referring to a disease, encephalopathy refers to a wide variety of brain disorders with very different etiologies, prognoses and implications. For example, prion diseases, all of which cause transmissible spongiform encephalopathies, are invariably fatal but other encephalopathies are reversible and can have a number of causes including nutritional deficiencies and toxins.

== See also ==
- Brain damage
- Neuroscience
- Neurological disorder
- Psychoorganic syndrome
