= NDUFS5 =

Protein-coding gene in humans

Identifiers
- Aliases: NDUFS5, CI-15k, CI15K, NADH:ubiquinone oxidoreductase subunit S5
- External IDs: OMIM: 603847; MGI: 1890889; GeneCards: NDUFS5

Gene location (Human)
Chr.	Chromosome 1 (human)
Band	1p34.3	Start	39,026,318 bp
Band	1p34.3	End	39,034,636 bp

Gene location (Mouse)
Chr.	Chromosome 4 (mouse)
Band	4|4 D2.2	Start	123,606,503 bp
Band	4|4 D2.2	End	123,611,995 bp
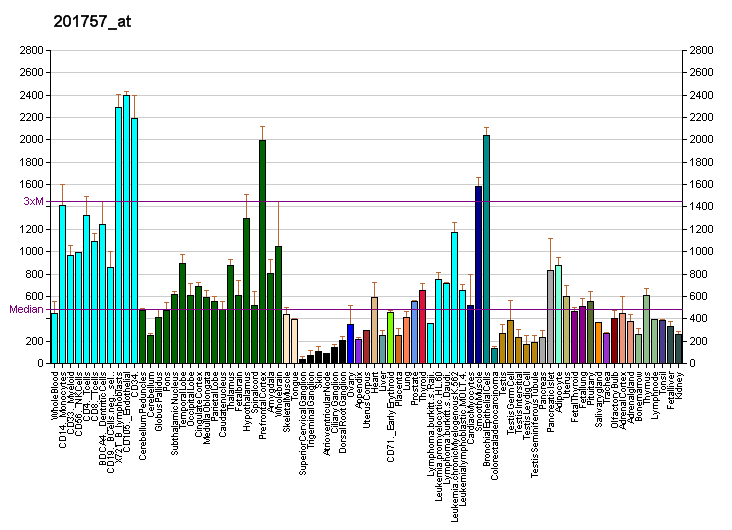
RNA expression pattern
Bgee	Human / Mouse (ortholog); Top expressed in: apex of heart; left ventricle; right auricle of heart; optic nerve; right frontal lobe; Brodmann area 9; nucleus accumbens; caudate nucleus; anterior pituitary; prefrontal cortex / Top expressed in: sternocleidomastoid muscle; right ventricle; temporal muscle; digastric muscle; triceps brachii muscle; right kidney; medial head of gastrocnemius muscle; soleus muscle; intercostal muscle; interventricular septum; More reference expression data
BioGPS	More reference expression data
Gene ontology
Molecular function	NADH dehydrogenase (ubiquinone) activity
Cellular component	mitochondrial inner membrane; mitochondrial respiratory chain complex I; mitochondrial intermembrane space; respirasome; membrane; mitochondrion
Biological process	mitochondrial respiratory chain complex I assembly; mitochondrial electron transport, NADH to ubiquinone
Sources:Amigo / QuickGO
Orthologs
Databases	NCBI: entry; OMA: entry
Species	Human	Mouse
Entrez	4725	595136
Ensembl	ENSG00000168653	ENSMUSG00000028648
UniProt	O43920	Q99LY9
RefSeq (mRNA)	NM_004552; NM_001184979	NM_001030274
RefSeq (protein)	NP_001171908; NP_004543	NP_001025445
Location (UCSC)	Chr 1: 39.03 – 39.03 Mb	Chr 4: 123.61 – 123.61 Mb
PubMed search
- Wikidata
View/Edit Human	View/Edit Mouse

NADH dehydrogenase [ubiquinone] iron-sulfur protein 5 is an enzyme that in humans is encoded by the NDUFS5 gene.
