= C3H7NO =

The molecular formula C_{3}H_{7}NO may refer to:

- Acetone oxime (acetoxime)
- 1-Amino-2-propanone
- Dimethylformamide
- Isoxazolidine
- N-Methylacetamide
- Oxazolidine
- Propionamide
