= C4H9N3O2 =

Molecular formula

The molecular formula C_{4}H_{9}N_{3}O_{2} (molar mass: 131.13 g/mol) may refer to:

- Creatine
- Guanidinopropionic acid
