= C3H7N3O2 =

The molecular formula C_{3}H_{7}N_{3}O_{2} (molar mass: 117.107 g/mol) may refer to:

- ENU (N-ethyl-N-nitrosourea), a potent mutagen
- Glycocyamine, a metabolite of glycine
