= Β-Methylamino-L-alanine =

β-Methylamino-L-alanine
- Stereo, skeletal formula of beta-methylamino-L-alanine (S)

Names
- IUPAC name 3-(Methylamino)-L-alanine
- Systematic IUPAC name (2S)-2-Amino-3-(methylamino)propanoic acid
- Other names 2-Amino-3-methylaminopropanoic acid

Identifiers
CAS Number	15920-93-1
3D model (JSmol)	Interactive image
ChEBI	CHEBI:73169
ChEMBL	ChEMBL11488
ChemSpider	94816
KEGG	C08291
MeSH	alpha-amino-beta-methylaminopropionate
PubChem CID	105089
UNII	108SA6URTV
CompTox Dashboard (EPA)	DTXSID60166611
- InChI: InChI=1S/C4H10N2O2/c1-6-2-3(5)4(7)8/h3,6H,2,5H2,1H3,(H,7,8)/t3-/m0/s1 Key: UJVHVMNGOZXSOZ-VKHMYHEASA-N
- SMILES: CNC[C@@H](C(=O)O)N

Properties
Chemical formula	C_{4}H_{10}N_{2}O_{2}
Molar mass	118.136 g·mol^{−1}
log P	−0.1
Acidity (pK_{a})	1.883
Basicity (pK_{b})	12.114

Related compounds
Related alkanoic acids	Sarcosine; Dimethylglycine; Glycocyamine; Creatine; N-Methyl-d-aspartic acid; Guanidinopropionic acid; Arginine
Related compounds	Dimethylacetamide
- Except where otherwise noted, data are given for materials in their standard state (at 25 °C [77 °F], 100 kPa). verify (what is ?) Infobox references

β-Methylamino-L-alanine, or BMAA, is a non-proteinogenic amino acid produced by cyanobacteria. BMAA is a neurotoxin. Its potential role in various neurodegenerative disorders is the subject of scientific research.

== Structure and properties ==
BMAA is a derivative of the amino acid alanine with a methylamino group on the side chain. This non-proteinogenic amino acid is classified as a polar base.

== Sources and detection ==
BMAA is produced by cyanobacteria in marine, freshwater, and terrestrial environments. In cultured non-nitrogen-fixing cyanobacteria, BMAA production increases in a nitrogen-depleted medium. The biosynthetic pathway in cyanobacteria is unknown, but involvement of BMAA and its structural analog 2,4-diaminobutanoic acid (2,4-DAB) in environmental iron scavenging has been hypothesized. BMAA has been found in aquatic organisms and in plants with cyanobacterial symbionts such as certain lichens, the floating fern Azolla, the leaf petioles of the tropical flowering plant Gunnera, cycads as well as in animals that eat the fleshy covering of cycad seeds, including flying foxes.

High concentrations (144 to 1836 ng/mg of flesh) of BMAA are present in shark fins. Because BMAA is a neurotoxin, consumption of shark fin soup and cartilage pills therefore may pose a health risk. The toxin can be detected via several laboratory methods, including liquid chromatography, high-performance liquid chromatography, mass spectrometry, amino acid analyzer, capillary electrophoresis, and NMR spectroscopy.

== Neurotoxicity ==
BMAA can cross the blood–brain barrier in rats. It takes longer to get into the brain than into other organs, but once there, it is trapped in proteins, forming a reservoir for slow release over time.

=== Mechanisms ===
Although the mechanisms by which BMAA causes motor neuron dysfunction and death are not entirely understood, current research suggests that there are multiple mechanisms of action. Acutely, BMAA can act as an excitotoxin on glutamate receptors, such as NMDA, calcium-dependent AMPA, and kainate receptors. The activation of the metabotropic glutamate receptor 5 is believed to induce oxidative stress in the neuron by depletion of glutathione.

BMAA can be misincorporated into nascent proteins in place of L-serine, possibly causing protein misfolding and aggregation, both hallmarks of tangle diseases, including Alzheimer's disease, Parkinson's disease, amyotrophic lateral sclerosis (ALS), progressive supranuclear palsy (PSP), and Lewy body disease. In vitro research has shown that protein association of BMAA may be inhibited in the presence of excess L-serine.

=== Effects ===
A study performed in 2015 with vervet monkeys (Chlorocebus sabaeus) in St. Kitts, which are homozygous for the apoE4 gene (a condition which in humans is a risk factor for Alzheimer's disease), found that vervets that were administered BMAA orally developed hallmark histopathology features of Alzheimer's disease, including amyloid beta plaques and neurofibrillary tangle accumulation. Vervets in the trial fed smaller doses of BMAA were found to have correlative decreases in these pathology features. Additionally, vervets that were co-administered BMAA with serine were found to have 70% less beta-amyloid plaques and neurofibrillary tangles than those administered BMAA alone, suggesting that serine may be protective against the neurotoxic effects of BMAA.

This experiment represents the first in-vivo model of Alzheimer's disease that features both beta-amyloid plaques and hyperphosphorylated tau protein. This study also demonstrates that BMAA, an environmental toxin, can trigger neurodegenerative disease as a result of a gene-environment interaction.

Degenerative locomotor diseases have been described in animals grazing on cycad species, fueling interest in a possible link between the plant and the etiology of ALS/PDC. Subsequent laboratory investigations discovered the presence of BMAA. BMAA induced severe neurotoxicity in rhesus macaques, including:

- limb muscle atrophy
- nonreactive degeneration of anterior horn cells
- degeneration and partial loss of pyramidal neurons of the motor cortex
- behavioral dysfunction
- conduction deficits in the central motor pathway
- neuropathological changes of motor cortex Betz cells

There are reports that low BMAA concentrations can selectively kill cultured motor neurons from mouse spinal cords and produce reactive oxygen species.

Scientists have also found that newborn rats treated with BMAA show a progressive neurodegeneration in the hippocampus, including intracellular fibrillar inclusions, and impaired learning and memory as adults. BMAA has been reported to be excreted into rodent breast milk, and subsequently transferred to the suckling offspring, suggesting mothers' and cows' milk might be other possible exposure routes.

=== Human cases ===
Chronic dietary exposure to BMAA is now considered to be a cause of the amyotrophic lateral sclerosis/parkinsonism–dementia complex (ALS/PDC) that had an extremely high rate of incidence among the Chamorro people of Guam. The Chamorro call the condition lytico-bodig. In the 1950s, ALS/PDC prevalence ratios and death rates for Chamorro residents of Guam and Rota were 50–100 times that of developed countries, including the United States. No demonstrable heritable or viral factors were found for the disease, and a subsequent decline of ALS/PDC after 1963 on Guam led to the search for responsible environmental agents. The use of flour made from cycad seed (Cycas micronesica) in traditional food items decreased as that plant became rarer and the Chamorro population became more Americanized following World War II. Cycads harbor symbiotic cyanobacteria of the genus Nostoc in specialized roots which push up through the leaf litter into the light; these cyanobacteria produce BMAA.

In addition to eating traditional food items from cycad flour directly, BMAA may be ingested by humans through biomagnification. Flying foxes, a Chamorro delicacy, forage on the fleshy seed covering of cycad seeds and concentrate the toxin in their bodies. Twenty-four specimens of flying foxes from museum collections were tested for BMAA, which was found in large concentrations in the flying foxes from Guam. As of 2021 studies continued examining BMAA biomagnification in marine and estuarine systems and its possible impact on human health outside of Guam.

Studies on human brain tissue of ALS/PDC, ALS, Alzheimer's disease, Parkinson's disease, Huntington's disease, and neurological controls indicated that BMAA is present in non-genetic progressive neurodegenerative disease, but not in controls or genetic-based Huntington's disease.

As of 2021 research into the role of BMAA as an environmental factor in neurodegenerative disease continued.

== Clinical trials ==
Safe and effective ways of treating ALS patients with L-serine that has been found to protect non-human primates from BMAA-induced neurodegeneration, have been goals of clinical trials conducted by the Phoenix Neurological Associates and the Forbes/Norris ALS/MND clinic and sponsored by the Institute for Ethnomedicine.

== See also ==
- Oxalyldiaminopropionic acid, a related toxin
