= N-Oleoylsarcosine =

Names
- IUPAC name N-Methyl-N-[(9Z)-octadec-9-enoyl]glycine
- Systematic IUPAC name [(9Z)-N-Methyloctadec-9-enamido]acetic acid
- Other names Oleyl sarcosine

Identifiers
CAS Number	110-25-8
3D model (JSmol)	Interactive image
ChemSpider	5289148
ECHA InfoCard	100.003.410
EC Number	203-749-3
PubChem CID	6912870
UNII	4011K1S96Y
CompTox Dashboard (EPA)	DTXSID5042243
- InChI: InChI=1S/C21H39NO3/c1-3-4-5-6-7-8-9-10-11-12-13-14-15-16-17-18-20(23)22(2)19-21(24)25/h10-11H,3-9,12-19H2,1-2H3,(H,24,25)/b11-10- Key: DIOYAVUHUXAUPX-KHPPLWFESA-N
- SMILES: CCCCCCCC/C=C\CCCCCCCC(=O)N(C)CC(=O)O

Properties
Chemical formula	C_{21}H_{39}NO_{3}
Molar mass	353.547 g·mol^{−1}
- Except where otherwise noted, data are given for materials in their standard state (at 25 °C [77 °F], 100 kPa). Infobox references

N-Oleoylsarcosine (Sarkosyl O) is an amphiphilic oleic acid derivative having a sarcosine head group (N-methylglycine) which is used as a water-in-oil emulsifier and corrosion inhibitor.

== Production ==
A standard method for the preparation of N-acylamino acids is the Schotten-Baumann reaction, in which oleoyl chloride (from oleic acid and, e.g. phosphorus trichloride) is added to an aqueous solution of N-methylglycine at pH 10 (kept constant by the addition of sodium hydroxide solution).

Fatty acid-free N-oleoylsarcosine is obtained as an oil. The method is not suitable for industrial surfactant synthesis because of the relatively expensive production of the carboxylic acid chlorides and the expensive disposal of the phosphonic acid obtained as a byproduct.

N-Oleoylsarcosine can be obtained in the reaction of oleic acid, N-methylglycine and its sodium salt at 170 °C for 8 to 10 hours upon elimination of water.

More gentle conditions (120 °C) and shorter reaction times (3.5 hours) can be used when methyl oleate is reacted with sodium N-methylglycinate upon the addition of equimolar amounts of sodium methoxide in methanol. After absorption in water, acidification with concentrated sulfuric acid and extraction with butanone, N-Oleoylsarcosine is obtained in 92.5% yield.

== Properties ==
N-Oleoylsarcosine is a clear, yellow to brown, viscous liquid, which is sparsely soluble in water and acts acidic. As long-chain N-acylamino acid, the surfactant is soluble in many organic solvents and in mineral oil. In the alkaline it dissolves well in water. Because of its carboxamide structure, Sarkosyl O is chemically stable even at high pH values and strongly foaming as an anionic surfactant. N-oleyl sarcosine is only slightly toxic and easily biodegradable.

== Applications ==
N-Oleoylsarcosine is a mild surfactant which irritates skin and eyes comparatively little and is therefore used in personal care products such as skin cleansing agents because of its antimicrobial and virucidal properties.

The sarcosine head group of the long-chain amphiphilic N-acylamino acid is responsible for the formation of chelate-like structures in the adsorption on polar and charged surfaces, e.g. on metals.

The molecules form oriented monomolecular films that protect the metal surface from corrosive attack.

N-Oleoylsarcosine possesses already at low concentrations very good rust protection properties (in particularly in combination with the imidazoline derivative 2-(2-heptadec-8-enyl-2-imidazolin-1-yl)ethanol which also acts emulsifying and anticorrosive), also against non-ferrous metals such as aluminum and copper. Therefore, N-oleoylsarcosine is added as a corrosion inhibitor and emulsifier to rust protection fluids and lubricating greases, fuels and lubricants and refrigerating lubricants such as drilling and cutting oils.
