= Guanidinoacetase =

Class of enzymes

guanidinoacetase

Identifiers
- EC no.: 3.5.3.2
- CAS no.: 9024-92-4

Databases
- BRENDA: enzyme data
- ExPASy: NiceZyme view
- KEGG: enzyme entry
- MetaCyc: metabolic pathway
- Rhea: reactions
- PDB structures: RCSB PDB PDBe PDBsum
- Gene Ontology: AmiGO / QuickGO
Search
- PMC: articles
- PubMed: articles
- NCBI: proteins

Guanidinoacetase (EC 3.5.3.2) is an enzyme characterised from Pseudomonas species of bacteria that catalyzes the hydrolysis of glycocyamine to glycine and urea:

glycocyamine
H_{2}O
glycine
+
urea

This enzyme is a hydrolase, one acting on carbon-nitrogen bonds other than peptide bonds, specifically in linear amidines. The systematic name of this enzyme class is guanidinoacetate amidinohydrolase. This enzyme is also called glycocyaminase. It uses manganese as a cofactor.
