= N-carbamoylsarcosine amidase =

Class of enzymes

Identifiers
- EC no.: 3.5.1.59
- CAS no.: 92767-52-7

Databases
- BRENDA: enzyme data
- ExPASy: NiceZyme view
- KEGG: enzyme entry
- MetaCyc: metabolic pathway
- Rhea: reactions
- PDB structures: RCSB PDB PDBe PDBsum
- Gene Ontology: AmiGO / QuickGO
Search
- PMC: articles
- PubMed: articles
- NCBI: proteins

N-carbamoylsarcosine amidase (EC 3.5.1.59) is an enzyme characterised from Pseudomonas putida that catalyzes the hydrolysis of 3-methylhydantoic acid (N-carbamoylsarcosine) to sarcosine, carbon dioxide, and ammonia:

3-methylhydantoic acid
H_{2}O
NH_{3}
sarcosine
+ CO_{2}

The reaction is part of the breakdown pathway for creatinine.

This enzyme is a hydrolase, one acting on carbon-nitrogen bonds other than peptide bonds, specifically in linear amides. The systematic name of this enzyme class is N-carbamoylsarcosine amidohydrolase. This enzyme is also called carbamoylsarcosine amidase.

== Structural studies ==
As of late 2007, only one structure has been solved for this class of enzymes, with the PDB accession code PDB: 1NBA.
