= Guanidinopropionic acid =

- Skeletal formula of a guanidinopropionic acid minor tautomer

Names
- IUPAC name 3-Carbamimidamidopropanoic acid
- Other names 3-(Diaminomethylideneamino)propanoic acid

Identifiers
CAS Number	353-09-3
3D model (JSmol)	Interactive image
Beilstein Reference	1705262
ChEBI	CHEBI:15968
ChEMBL	ChEMBL20489
ChemSpider	61020
ECHA InfoCard	100.005.937
EC Number	206-530-0
KEGG	C03065
MeSH	guanidopropionic+acid
PubChem CID	67701
RTECS number	AY3157500
UNII	UL1984YRKA
CompTox Dashboard (EPA)	DTXSID40188795
- InChI: InChI=1S/C4H9N3O2/c5-4(6)7-2-1-3(8)9/h1-2H2,(H,8,9)(H4,5,6,7) Key: KMXXSJLYVJEBHI-UHFFFAOYSA-N
- SMILES: NC(=N)NCCC(O)=O

Properties
Chemical formula	C_{4}H_{9}N_{3}O_{2}
Molar mass	131.135 g·mol^{−1}
Appearance	White crystals
Odor	Odourless
log P	−1.472
Acidity (pK_{a})	4.219
Basicity (pK_{b})	9.778

Hazards
- GHS labelling
Pictograms	(GHS07: Exclamation mark)
Signal word	Warning
Hazard statements	H315, H319, H335
Precautionary statements	P261, P305+P351+P338

Related compounds
Related alkanoic acids	Sarcosine; Dimethylglycine; Glycocyamine; Creatine; N-Methyl-D-aspartic acid; beta-Methylamino-L-alanine; Arginine
Related compounds	Dimethylacetamide
- Except where otherwise noted, data are given for materials in their standard state (at 25 °C [77 °F], 100 kPa). verify (what is ?) Infobox references

β-Guanidinopropionic acid, also referred to as guanidinopropionic acid, beta-guanidinopropionic acid or β-GPA, is a dietary supplement.

β-Guanidinopropionic acid, also known as Ompenaclid (RGX-202), is being investigated in colorectal cancer by Inspirna and Merck

β-Guanidinopropionic acid is a white crystalline powder soluble in water (50 mg/ml-clear, colorless solution).

Studies on animals (rats, monkeys, hamsters) show that acidic guanidine derivatives such as β-GPA can ameliorate hyperglycemia in animal models of noninsulin-dependent diabetes.

Though the oral availability of β-GPA is well established, the basic uptake mechanism has not been studied yet.
