= Dimethylglycine =

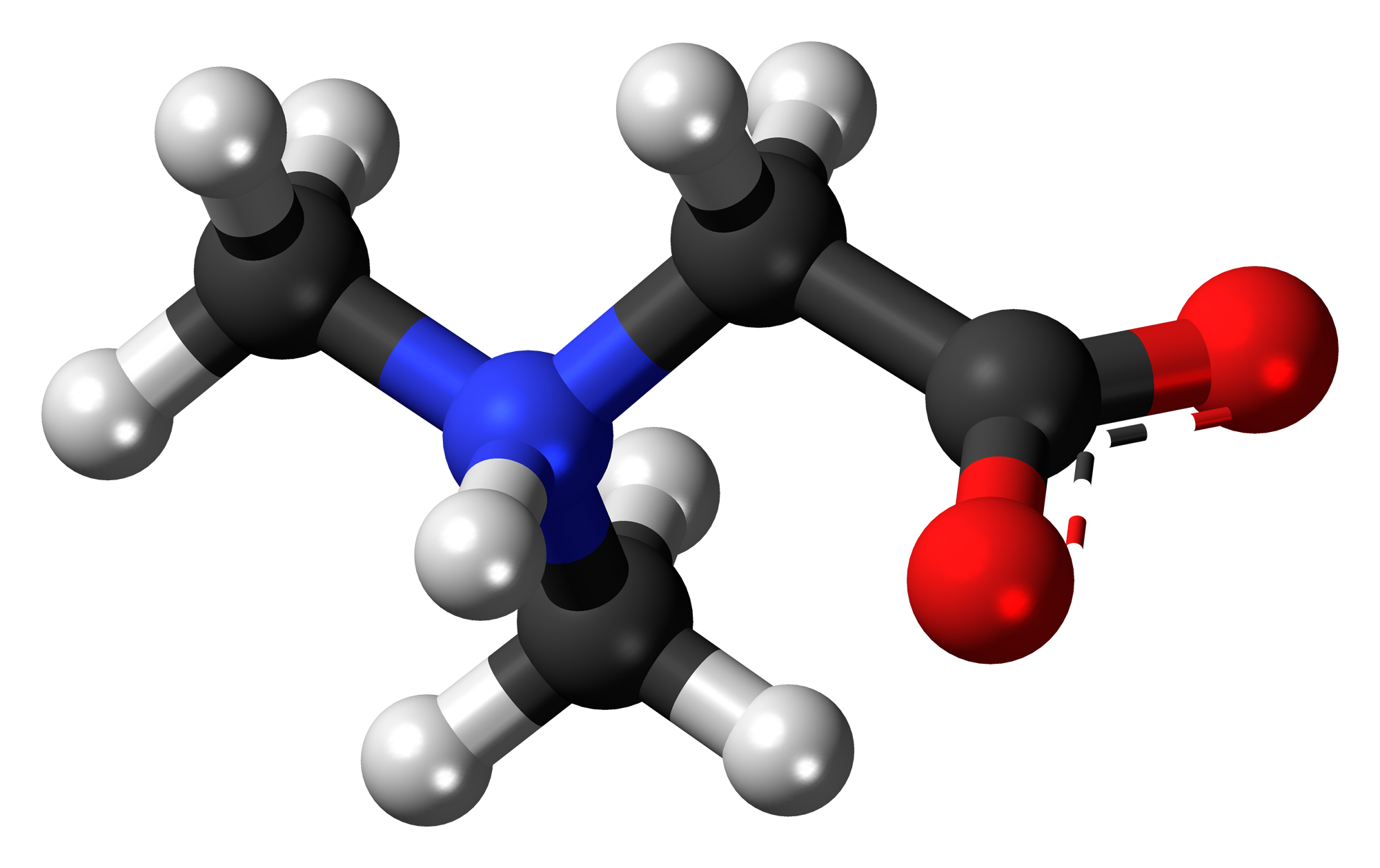

Names
- IUPAC name N,N-Dimethylglycine
- Systematic IUPAC name (Dimethylamino)acetic acid

Identifiers
CAS Number	1118-68-9
3D model (JSmol)	Interactive image
Beilstein Reference	1700261
ChEBI	CHEBI:17724
ChemSpider	653
DrugBank	DB02083
ECHA InfoCard	100.012.971
EC Number	214-267-8
Gmelin Reference	82215
KEGG	C01026
MeSH	dimethylglycine
PubChem CID	673
RTECS number	MB9865000
UNII	7797M4CPPA
CompTox Dashboard (EPA)	DTXSID6074336
- InChI: InChI=1S/C4H9NO2/c1-5(2)3-4(6)7/h3H2,1-2H3,(H,6,7) Key: FFDGPVCHZBVARC-UHFFFAOYSA-N
- SMILES: CN(C)CC(O)=O

Properties
Chemical formula	C_{4}H_{9}NO_{2}
Molar mass	103.121 g·mol^{−1}
Appearance	White crystals
Odor	Odourless
Density	1.069 g/mL
Melting point	178 to 182 °C (352 to 360 °F; 451 to 455 K)
Boiling point	175.2 °C (347.4 °F; 448.3 K)

Hazards
- GHS labelling
Pictograms	(GHS07: Exclamation mark)
Signal word	Warning
Hazard statements	H302
- Lethal dose or concentration (LD, LC)
LD_{50} (median dose)	>650 mg kg^{−1} (oral, rat)

Related compounds
Related alkanoic acids	Sarcosine; Glycocyamine; Creatine; N-Methyl-D-aspartic acid; beta-Methylamino-L-alanine; Guanidinopropionic acid
Related compounds	Dimethylacetamide
- Except where otherwise noted, data are given for materials in their standard state (at 25 °C [77 °F], 100 kPa). verify (what is ?) Infobox references

Dimethylglycine (DMG) is a derivative of the amino acid glycine with the structural formula (CH_{3})_{2}NCH_{2}COOH. It can be found in beans and liver, and has a sweet taste. It can be formed from trimethylglycine by removing one of its methyl groups. It is also a byproduct of the metabolism of choline.

When DMG was first discovered, it was referred to as Vitamin B_{16}, but, unlike true B vitamins, deficiency of DMG in the diet does not lead to any ill-effects and it is synthesized by the human body in the citric acid cycle meaning it does not meet the definition of a vitamin.

== Uses ==
Dimethylglycine has been suggested for use as an athletic performance enhancer, immunostimulant, and a treatment for autism, epilepsy, or mitochondrial disease. There is no evidence that dimethylglycine is effective for treating mitochondrial disease. Published studies on the subject have shown little to no difference between DMG treatment and placebo in autism spectrum disorders.

== Biological activity ==
Dimethylglycine has been found to act as an agonist of the glycine site of the NMDA receptor.

== Preparation ==
This compound is commercially available as the free form amino acid, and as the hydrochloride salt [2491-06-7 ]. DMG may be prepared by the alkylation of glycine via the Eschweiler–Clarke reaction. In this reaction, glycine is treated with aqueous formaldehyde in formic acid that serves as both solvent and reductant. Hydrochloric acid is added thereafter to give the hydrochloride salt. The free amino acid may have been obtained by neutralization of the acid salt, which has been performed with silver oxide.

H_{2}NCH_{2}COOH + 2 CH_{2}O + 2 HCOOH → (CH_{3})_{2}NCH_{2}COOH + 2 CO_{2} + 2 H_{2}O

== See also ==
- Monomethylglycine
