= Creatine =

Chemical compound

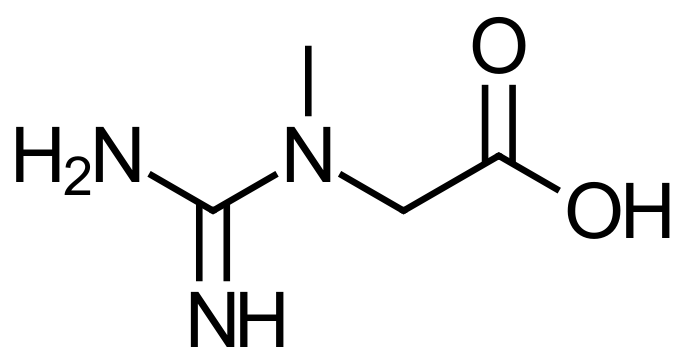
- Skeletal formula of neutral form of creatine Skeletal formula of neutral form of creatine

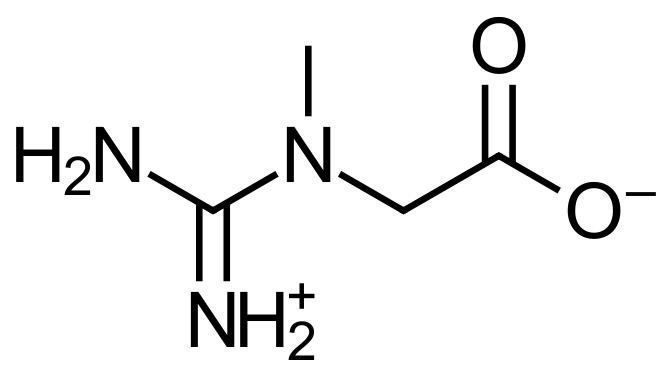
- Skeletal formula of one of zwitterionic forms of creatine Skeletal formula of one of the zwitterionic forms of creatine

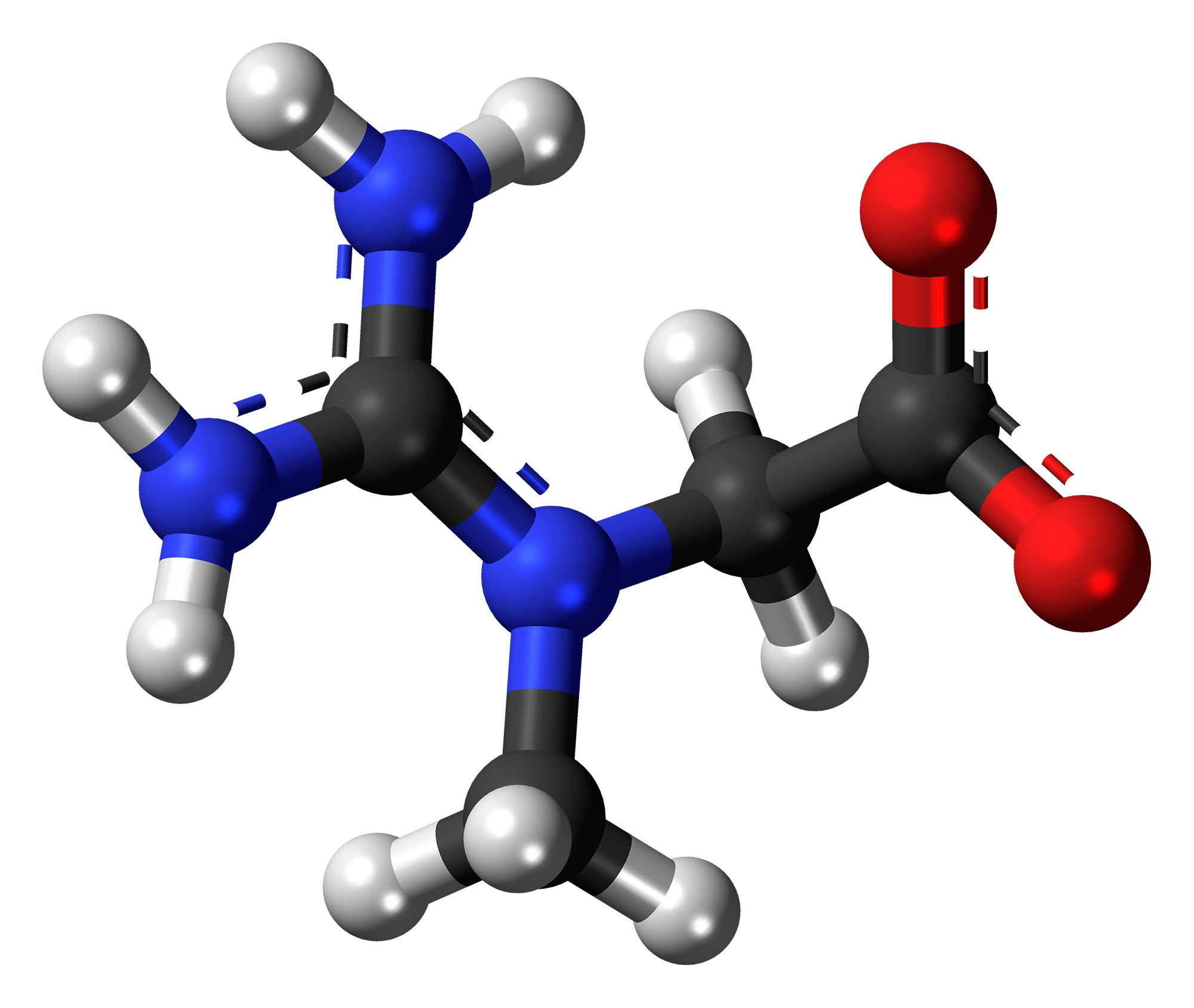
- Ball and stick model of creatine Ball and stick model of one zwitterionic form of creatine

Names
- Systematic IUPAC name 2-[Carbamimidoyl(methyl)amino]acetic acid
- Other names N-Carbamimidoyl-N-methylglycine; Methylguanidoacetic acid; N-amidinosarcosine

Identifiers
CAS Number	57-00-1
3D model (JSmol)	Interactive image
Beilstein Reference	907175
ChEBI	CHEBI:16919
ChEMBL	ChEMBL283800
ChemSpider	566
DrugBank	DB00148
ECHA InfoCard	100.000.278
EC Number	200-306-6
Gmelin Reference	240513
KEGG	C00300
MeSH	Creatine
PubChem CID	586
RTECS number	MB7706000
UNII	MU72812GK0
CompTox Dashboard (EPA)	DTXSID1040451
- InChI: InChI=1S/C4H9N3O2/c1-7(4(5)6)2-3(8)9/h2H2,1H3,(H3,5,6)(H,8,9) Key: CVSVTCORWBXHQV-UHFFFAOYSA-N
- SMILES: CN(CC(=O)O)C(=N)N

Properties
Chemical formula	C_{4}H_{9}N_{3}O_{2}
Molar mass	131.135 g·mol^{−1}
Appearance	White crystals
Odor	Odourless
Density	1.33 g/cm^{3}
Melting point	255 °C (491 °F; 528 K)
Solubility in water	13.3 g L^{−1} (at 18 °C)
log P	−1.258
Vapor pressure	0.001 mmHg
Acidity (pK_{a})	3.429
Basicity (pK_{b})	10.568
Isoelectric point	8.47

Thermochemistry
Heat capacity (C)	171.1 J K^{−1} mol^{−1} (at 23.2 °C)
Std molar entropy (S^{⦵}_{298})	189.5 J K^{−1} mol^{−1}
Std enthalpy of formation (Δ_{f}H^{⦵}_{298})	−538.06–−536.30 kJ mol^{−1}
Std enthalpy of combustion (Δ_{c}H^{⦵}_{298})	−2.3239–−2.3223 MJ mol^{−1}

Pharmacology
ATC code	C01EB06 (WHO)
Routes of administration	Oral
- Pharmacokinetics
Bioavailability	Unknown (but <100%)
Protein binding	Unknown (but likely negligible)
Metabolism	Cyclization, phosphorylation (via creatine kinase)
Metabolites	Creatinine and phosphocreatine
Onset of action	≤10 g: 0.83–2.2 h (T_{max}) >10 g: 3–4 h (T_{max})
Biological half-life	0.68–2.9 hours
Excretion	Urine via kidneys

Hazards
- GHS labelling
Pictograms	(GHS07: Exclamation mark)
Signal word	Warning
Hazard statements	H315, H319, H335
Precautionary statements	P261, P305+P351+P338
NFPA 704 (fire diamond)	1 1 0
Flash point	118.1 °C (244.6 °F; 391.2 K)
Autoignition temperature	> 400 °C
- Lethal dose or concentration (LD, LC)
LD_{50} (median dose)	> 2000 mg/kg (dermal, rat)
Safety data sheet (SDS)	ChemicalBook

Related compounds
Related alkanoic acids	Sarcosine; Dimethylglycine; Glycocyamine; N-Methyl-D-aspartic acid; beta-Methylamino-L-alanine; Guanidinopropionic acid
Related compounds	Dimethylacetamide
- Except where otherwise noted, data are given for materials in their standard state (at 25 °C [77 °F], 100 kPa). verify (what is ?) Infobox references

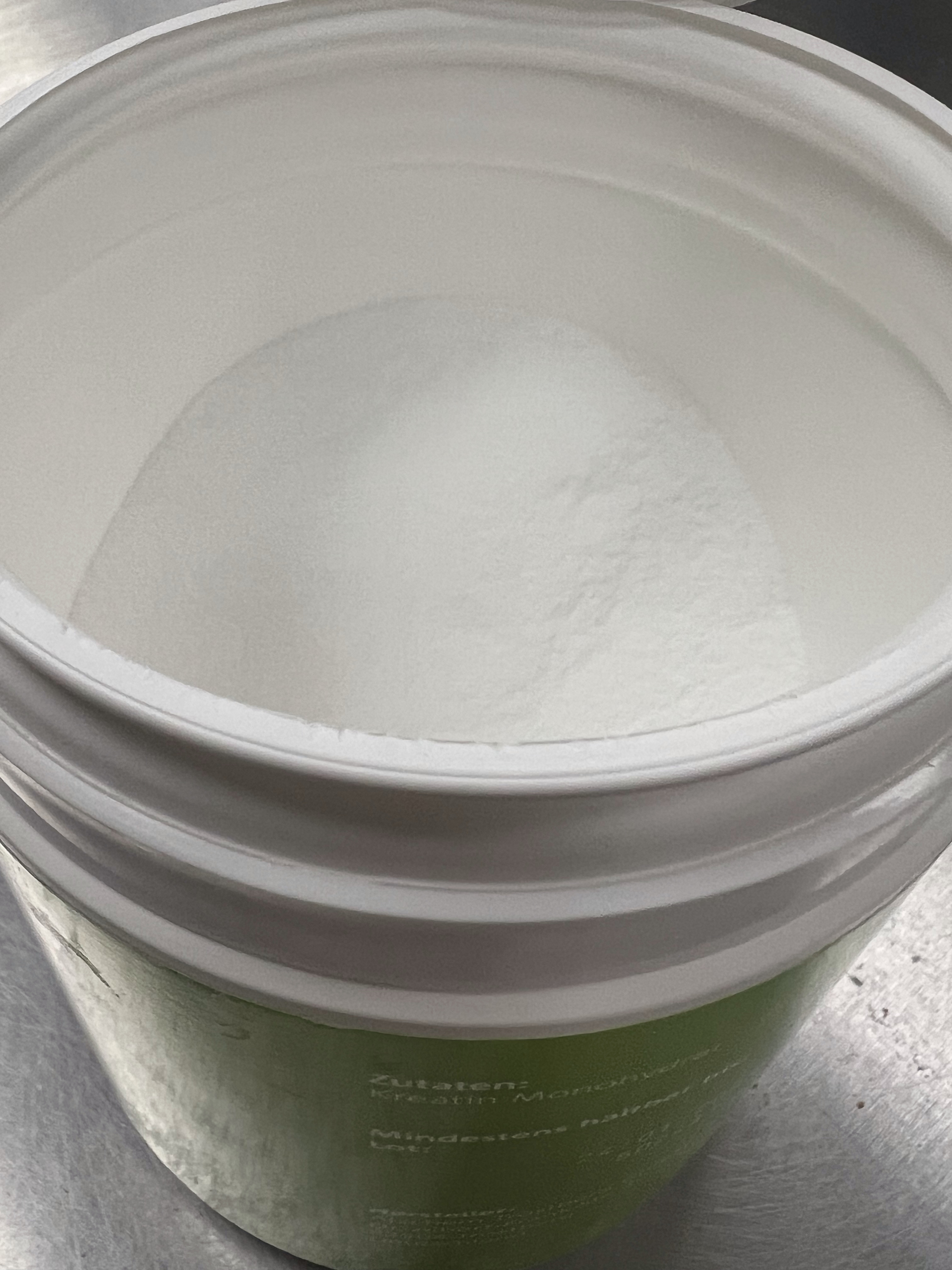
Creatine monohydrate powder

Creatine (/ˈkriːətiːn/ or /ˈkriːətɪn/) is an organic compound that facilitates recycling of adenosine triphosphate (ATP) in vertebrates, primarily in their muscle and brain tissue. It is a popular dietary supplement.

Its phosphorylated form, phosphocreatine, donates phosphate groups to adenosine diphosphate (ADP), turning it back into ATP. Creatine also acts as a buffer. It has the nominal formula (H_{2}N)(HN)CN(CH_{3})CH_{2}CO_{2}H. In solutions, it exists in various tautomers, including a neutral form and zwitterionic forms.

== History ==
Creatine was first identified in 1832 when Michel Eugène Chevreul isolated the precipitate from the basified water-extract of skeletal muscle. He later named the crystallized precipitate after the Greek word for meat, κρέας (kreas). In 1928, creatine was shown to exist in equilibrium with creatinine. Studies in the 1920s showed that consumption of large amounts of creatine did not result in its excretion. This result pointed to the ability of the body to store creatine, which in turn suggested its use as a dietary supplement.

In 1912, Harvard University researchers Otto Folin and Willey Glover Denis found evidence that ingesting creatine can dramatically boost the creatine content of the muscle. The discovery of phosphocreatine was reported in 1927.

In the 1960s, the enzyme creatine kinase was shown to phosphorylate ADP using phosphocreatine to generate ATP and thus buffering the ATP/ADP ratio.

While creatine's influence on physical performance has been well documented since the early twentieth century, it came into public view following the 1992 Olympics in Barcelona. An 7 August 1992 article in The Times reported that Linford Christie, the gold medal winner at 100 metres, had used creatine before the Olympics. An article in Bodybuilding Monthly named Sally Gunnell, who was the gold medalist in the 400-metre hurdles, as another creatine user. In addition, The Times also noted that 110 metre hurdler Colin Jackson began taking creatine before the Olympics.

Phosphocreatine relays phosphate to ADP.

At the time, low-potency creatine supplements were available in Britain, but creatine supplements designed for strength enhancement were not commercially available until 1993 when the company Experimental and Applied Sciences (EAS) introduced the compound to the sports nutrition market under the name Phosphagen. In 1996, researchers found that carbohydrate consumption augments the effects of creatine supplementation on skeletal muscle creatine accumulation.

The cyclic derivative creatinine exists in equilibrium with its tautomer and with creatine.

== Metabolic role ==
Creatine is a naturally occurring non-protein compound and the primary constituent of phosphocreatine, which is used to regenerate ATP within the cell. 95% of the human body's total creatine and phosphocreatine stores are found in skeletal muscle, while the remainder is distributed in the blood, brain, testes, and other tissues. The typical creatine content of skeletal muscle (as both creatine and phosphocreatine) is 120 mmol per kilogram of dry muscle mass, but can reach up to 160 mmol/kg through supplementation. Approximately 1–2% of intramuscular creatine is degraded per day, so people need about 1–3 grams of creatine a day to maintain average (unsupplemented) creatine storage. An omnivorous diet provides roughly half of this value, with the remainder synthesized in the liver and kidneys.

=== Biosynthesis ===
Creatine is not an essential nutrient. It is an amino acid derivative, naturally produced in the body from the amino acids glycine and arginine, with an additional requirement for S-adenosyl methionine (a derivative of methionine) to catalyze the transformation of guanidinoacetate to creatine.

In the first step of the biosynthesis, the enzyme arginine:glycine amidinotransferase (AGAT, EC:2.1.4.1) mediates the reaction of glycine and arginine to form guanidinoacetate. This product is then methylated by guanidinoacetate N-methyltransferase (GAMT, EC:2.1.1.2), using S-adenosyl methionine as the methyl donor. Creatine itself can be phosphorylated by creatine kinase to form phosphocreatine, which is used as an energy buffer in skeletal muscles and the brain.

A cyclic form of creatine, called creatinine, exists in equilibrium with its tautomer and with creatine.

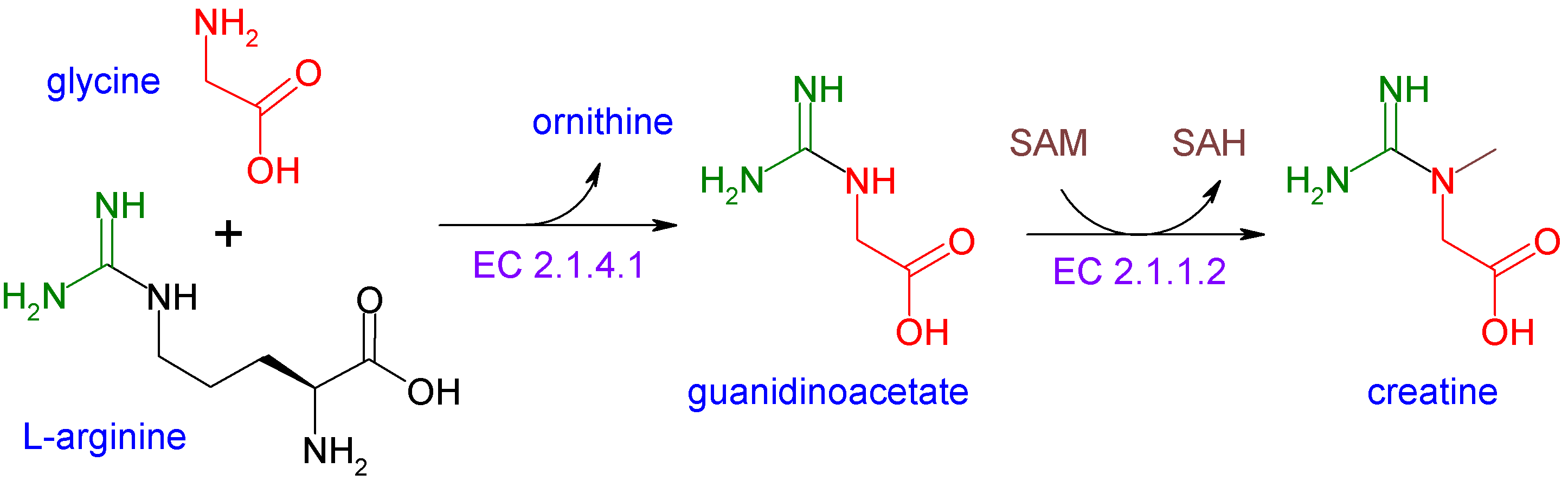

=== Phosphocreatine system ===
Creatine is transported through the blood and taken up by tissues with high energy demands, such as the brain and skeletal muscle, through an active transport system. The concentration of ATP in skeletal muscle is usually 2–5 mM, which would result in a muscle contraction of only a few seconds. During times of increased energy demands, the phosphagen (or ATP/PCr) system rapidly resynthesizes ATP from ADP with the use of phosphocreatine (PCr) through a reversible reaction catalysed by the enzyme creatine kinase (CK). The phosphate group is attached to an NH center of the creatine. In skeletal muscle, PCr concentrations may reach 20–35 mM or more. Additionally, in most muscles, the ATP regeneration capacity of CK is very high and is therefore not a limiting factor. Although the cellular concentrations of ATP are small, changes are difficult to detect because ATP is continuously and efficiently replenished from the large pools of PCr and CK. Creatine has the ability to increase muscle stores of PCr, potentially increasing the muscle's ability to resynthesize ATP from ADP to meet increased energy demands.

Creatine supplementation, when combined with strength training, has been reported in humans to augment training-induced increases in satellite cell content and myonuclei number per muscle fiber, changes that may support increases in muscle fiber size. In a separate study of rehabilitative strength training following immobilization, creatine supplementation was associated with increased muscle MRF4 protein expression; however, whether changes in MRF4 directly mediate myonuclear accretion or hypertrophy remains uncertain.

=== Genetic deficiencies ===
Genetic defects in the creatine biosynthetic pathway enzymes lead to various severe neurological defects. Defects in the two synthesis enzymes cause L-arginine:glycine amidinotransferase deficiency and guanidinoacetate methyltransferase deficiency. Both biosynthetic defects are inherited in an autosomal recessive manner. Creatine transporter defect, characterized by insufficient transport of creatine to the brain, is caused by mutations in SLC6A8 and is inherited in an X-linked manner.

=== Vegans and vegetarians ===
Vegan and vegetarian diets are associated with lower levels of muscle creatine, and athletes on these diets may benefit from creatine supplementation.

== Dosing ==
=== Loading phase ===
Approximate muscle total creatine levels in mmol/kg dry weight muscle reported in the literature for vegetarians, individuals following a normal diet, and in response to creatine loading with or without carbohydrate (CHO) or CHO and protein (PRO). Dietary supplementation of creatine serves to increase muscle creatine and PCr by 20–40%.

An approximation of 0.3 g/kg/day divided into 4 equal spaced intervals has been suggested since creatine needs may vary based on body weight. It has also been shown that taking a lower dose of 3 grams a day for 28 days can also increase total muscle creatine storage to the same amount as the rapid loading dose of 20 g/day for 6 days. However, a 28-day loading phase does not allow for ergogenic benefits of creatine supplementation to be realized until fully saturated muscle storage.

This elevation in muscle creatine storage has been correlated with ergogenic benefits discussed in the research section. However, higher doses for longer periods of time are being studied to offset creatine synthesis deficiencies and mitigating diseases.

=== Maintenance phase ===
After the 5–7 day loading phase, muscle creatine stores are fully saturated and supplementation only needs to cover the amount of creatine broken down per day. This maintenance dose was originally reported to be around 2–3 g/day (or 0.03 g/kg/day), however, some studies have suggested 3–5 g/day maintenance dose to maintain saturated muscle creatine.

== Pharmacokinetics ==
Most of the research on creatine so far has focused on its pharmacological properties. There has been less research into the pharmacokinetics of creatine. Studies have not established pharmacokinetic parameters for clinical usage of creatine such as volume of distribution, clearance, bioavailability, mean residence time, absorption rate, and half life. A clear pharmacokinetic profile would need to be established prior to the determination of optimal clinical dosing.

=== Absorption ===
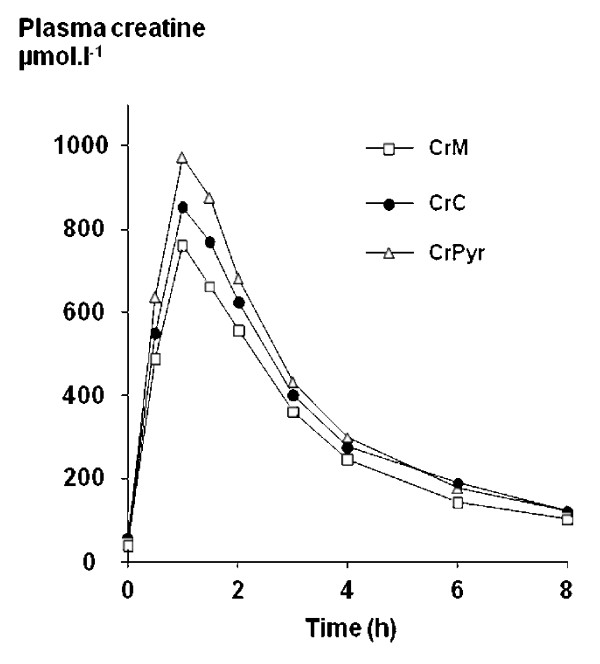
This graph shows the mean plasma creatine concentration (measured in μmol/L) over an 8-hour period following ingestion of 4.4 grams of creatine in the form of creatine monohydrate (CrM), tri-creatine citrate (CrC), or creatine pyruvate (CrPyr).

The absolute oral bioavailability of creatine is unknown due to lack of intravenous studies. However, the bioavailability of creatine is believed to be less than 100%. Creatine is thought to be absorbed from the gastrointestinal tract into the body in a similar way as amino acids and peptides. This may involve creatine transporters, amino acid transporters, and/or peptide transporters. The absorption of creatine may be saturable due to dependence on active transport mechanisms.

The time to peak (T_{max}) levels of creatine have been found to range from 0.83 to 2.2 hours at doses of 2.5 to 10 grams and from 3 to 4 hours at doses of 15 to 20 grams. As such, the time to peak levels of creatine appears to increase with dose. This is probably due to saturation of active transport processes. The time to peak levels of creatine appears to increase with carbohydrate intake.

Endogenous serum or plasma creatine concentrations in healthy adults are normally in a range of 2–12 mg/L. A single 5 gram (5000 mg) oral dose in healthy adults results in a peak plasma creatine level of approximately 120 mg/L at 1–2 hours post-ingestion. Creatine has a fairly short elimination half life, maintaining an elevated plasma level would require taking small oral doses every 3 to 6 hours throughout the day.

=== Distribution ===
Creatine is distributed in the body via creatine transporters. It is pseudo-irreversibly taken up into skeletal muscle. Skeletal muscle has a finite capacity to store creatine and can become saturated. More than 95% of creatine is found in skeletal muscle, with the rest found in red and white blood cells, the brain, the retina of the eyes, cardiac muscle, kidneys, and spermatozoa of the testes. Various endogenous signaling molecules, such as catecholamines, thyroid hormone, insulin-like growth factor 1 (IGF-1), insulin, and insulin-stimulating compounds like high-glycemic carbohydrates can affect the uptake of creatine into skeletal muscle, for instance increasing creatine uptake by up to 3-fold. Exercise can increase creatine uptake into skeletal muscle as well, most likely via increased activity of creatine transporters. The plasma protein binding of creatine is unknown but is expected to be negligible due to the compound's hydrophilicity.

=== Metabolism ===
Creatine is metabolized into creatinine via spontaneous cyclization and into phosphocreatine via phosphorylation mediated by creatine kinase (also known as creatine phosphokinase). It is not subject to first-pass metabolism. The degradation of creatine into creatinine in the gastrointestinal tract is thought to be minimal. The gut microbiota may have the capacity to metabolize creatine into creatinine.

=== Elimination ===
Creatine and its metabolite creatinine are eliminated via uptake into various organs and cells and via the kidneys into urine. The elimination half-life of creatine ranges from 0.68 to 2.9 hours in different studies.

== Exercise and sport ==
Creatine is a widely researched dietary supplement that increases muscle phosphocreatine stores; it thus enhances short bursts of high-intensity exercise and facilitates strength adaptations. It is most effective in monohydrate form using a loading phase followed by a maintenance dosing protocol. (Creatine supplements are marketed in ethyl ester, gluconate, monohydrate, and nitrate forms.) According to a 2018 review article in the Journal of the International Society of Sports Nutrition creatine monohydrate is the most effective nutritional supplement to increase high intensity exercise capacity and muscle mass during training.

Creatine use can increase maximum power and performance in high-intensity anaerobic repetitive work (periods of work and rest) by 5% to 15%. Creatine supplementation exerts positive ergogenic effects on single and multiple bouts of short-duration, high-intensity exercise activities, in addition to potentiating exercise training adaptations. Creatine has no significant effect on aerobic endurance.

Creatine supplementation for sporting performance enhancement is considered safe for short-term and long-term use, but there is a lack of safety data for use in children and in pregnancy.

A 2014 survey of 21,000 US college athletes showed that 14% of athletes take creatine supplements.

== Research ==
=== Cognitive performance ===
Creatine is sometimes reported to have a beneficial effect on brain function and cognitive processing, although the evidence is difficult to interpret systematically and the appropriate dosing is unknown. The greatest effect appears to be in individuals who are stressed (due, for instance, to sleep deprivation) or cognitively impaired.

A 2018 systematic review found that "generally, there was evidence that short-term memory and intelligence/reasoning may be improved by creatine administration", whereas for other cognitive domains "the results were conflicting".

A 2023 meta-analysis including 8 randomized controlled trials found that creatine supplementation improved memory performance with dosing parameters such as intake amounts and duration having no additional effects. Any positive effects on cognition from creatine supplementation seem to be greater for older adults.

A 2024 systematic review found no significant effect for healthy, unstressed individuals and mixed results for people under stress, suggesting that more research is needed to determine optimal dosing parameters and quantify changes in brain creatine levels during supplementation.

In a 2024 scientific opinion article, the European Food Safety Authority Panel on Nutrition, Novel Foods and Food Allergens determined that a cause and effect relationship cannot be established between creatine supplementation and increased cognitive function based on existing studies. In particular, it ruled that there was insufficient evidence on the mechanisms by which creatine can impact cognition.

=== Depression ===
Creatine may have a small positive effect on depressive symptoms, but the benefit is likely not clinically significant.

=== Sports injuries ===
According to several studies, creatine supplements decrease or at least do not increase the incidence of musculoskeletal injury, muscle cramping, and dehydration. In a study, creatine users had fewer incidences than non-users of muscle pulls/strains, muscle tightness, cramping, heat illness/dehydration, non-contact injuries, and total injuries/missed practices.

=== Muscular disease ===
A meta-analysis found that creatine treatment increased muscle strength in muscular dystrophies, and potentially improved functional performance. Creatine treatment does not appear to improve muscle strength in people who have metabolic myopathies. High doses of creatine lead to increased muscle pain and an impairment in activities of daily living when taken by people who have McArdle disease.

=== Mitochondrial diseases ===
==== Parkinson's disease ====
Creatine's impact on mitochondrial function has led to research on its efficacy and safety for slowing Parkinson's disease. As of 2014, the evidence did not provide a reliable foundation for treatment decisions, due to risk of bias, small sample sizes, and the short duration of trials.

==== Huntington's disease ====
Several primary studies have been completed but as of 2017 no systematic review on Huntington's disease had been completed.

=== ALS ===
It is ineffective as a treatment for amyotrophic lateral sclerosis.

=== Testosterone ===
A 2021 systemic review of studies found that "the current body of evidence does not indicate that creatine supplementation increases total testosterone, free testosterone, DHT or causes hair loss/baldness".

=== Cardiovascular disease ===
A 2011 systematic review evaluated the effectiveness of creatine and creatine analogues in adults with cardiovascular disease, including heart failure and myocardial infarction. The studies assessed the use of various creatine-based compounds—such as creatine, creatine phosphate, and phosphocreatinine—administered via oral, intravenous, or intramuscular routes, typically as adjuncts to standard therapy.

The analysis found no conclusive evidence that creatine or its analogues significantly affect mortality, myocardial infarction progression, or ejection fraction. However, some studies suggested a potential improvement in cardiac dysrhythmias and dyspnoea. The trials varied considerably in terms of drug formulation, dosage, treatment duration, and patient populations. Notably, no studies were identified that examined the effects of these compounds in patients with essential hypertension.

Due to the small sample sizes, clinical heterogeneity, and inconsistent outcomes across trials, the authors concluded that more rigorous and larger-scale studies are necessary to establish the clinical utility of creatine analogues in cardiovascular care.

=== Pregnancy ===
It has been found that women who consumed ≥13 mg of creatine per kg of body mass daily have a lower risk of obstetric conditions. Creatine's properties support energy for production, stabilization of maternal plasma creatine, improved pregnancy outcomes, as well as reduced oxidative stress. It was also found to reduce risk of preterm birth, support immune function, and reduce risk of perinatal brain injury. Perinatal brain injury occurs after hypoxia events, creatine allows cells to recover faster.

=== Sarcopenia ===
The combination of creatine supplementation and resistance training increases lean mass and strength in the elderly.

== Adverse effects ==
Side effects include:

- Weight gain due to extra water retention to the muscle
- Upset stomach

One well-documented effect of creatine supplementation is weight gain within the first week of the supplement schedule, likely attributable to greater water retention due to the increased muscle creatine concentrations by means of osmosis.

A 2009 systematic review discredited concerns that creatine supplementation could affect hydration status and heat tolerance and lead to muscle cramping and diarrhea.

Despite weight gain due to water retention and potential cramps being two seemingly "common" side effects, new research indicates that these side effects are likely not the result of creatine usage. In addition, the initial water retention is attributed to more short-term creatine use (the "loading" phase). Studies have shown that creatine usage does not necessarily affect total body water relative to muscle mass in the long-term.

=== Renal function ===
A 2019 systematic review published by the National Kidney Foundation investigated whether creatine supplementation had adverse effects on renal function. They identified 15 studies from 1997 to 2013 that looked at standard creatine loading and maintenance protocols of 4–20 g/day of creatine versus placebo. They utilized serum creatinine, creatinine clearance, and serum urea levels as a measure of renal damage. While in general creatine supplementation resulted in slightly elevated creatinine levels that remained within normal limits, supplementation did not induce renal damage (P value< 0.001). Special populations included in the 2019 Systematic review included type 2 diabetic patients and post-menopausal women, bodybuilders, athletes, and resistance trained populations. The study also discussed 3 case studies where there were reports that creatine affected renal function.

In a joint statement between the American College of Sports Medicine, Academy of Nutrition and Dietetics, and Dietitians in Canada on performance enhancing nutrition strategies, creatine was included in their list of ergogenic aids and they do not list renal function as a concern for use.

The most recent position stand on creatine from the Journal of International Society of Sports Nutrition states that creatine is safe to take in healthy populations from infants to the elderly to performance athletes. They also state that long term (5 years) use of creatine has been considered safe.

== Safety ==
=== Contamination ===
A 2011 survey of 33 supplements commercially available in Italy found that over 50% of them exceeded the European Food Safety Authority recommendations in at least one contaminant. The most prevalent of these contaminants was creatinine, a breakdown product of creatine also produced by the body. Creatinine was present in higher concentrations than the European Food Safety Authority recommendations in 44% of the samples. About 15% of the samples had detectable levels of dihydro-1,3,5-triazine or a high dicyandiamide concentration. Heavy metals contamination was not found to be a concern, with only minor levels of mercury being detectable. Two studies reviewed in 2007 found no impurities.'

=== Food and cooking ===
When creatine is mixed with protein and sugar at high temperatures (above 148 °C), the resulting reaction produces carcinogenic heterocyclic amines (HCAs). Such a reaction happens when grilling or pan-frying meat. Creatine content (as a percentage of crude protein) can be used as an indicator of meat quality.

== Dietary considerations ==
Creatine monohydrate is suitable for vegetarians and vegans, as the raw materials used for the production of the supplement have no animal origin.

== See also ==
- β-Alanine
- Creatine methyl ester
