= GNMT =

Protein-coding gene in the species Homo sapiens

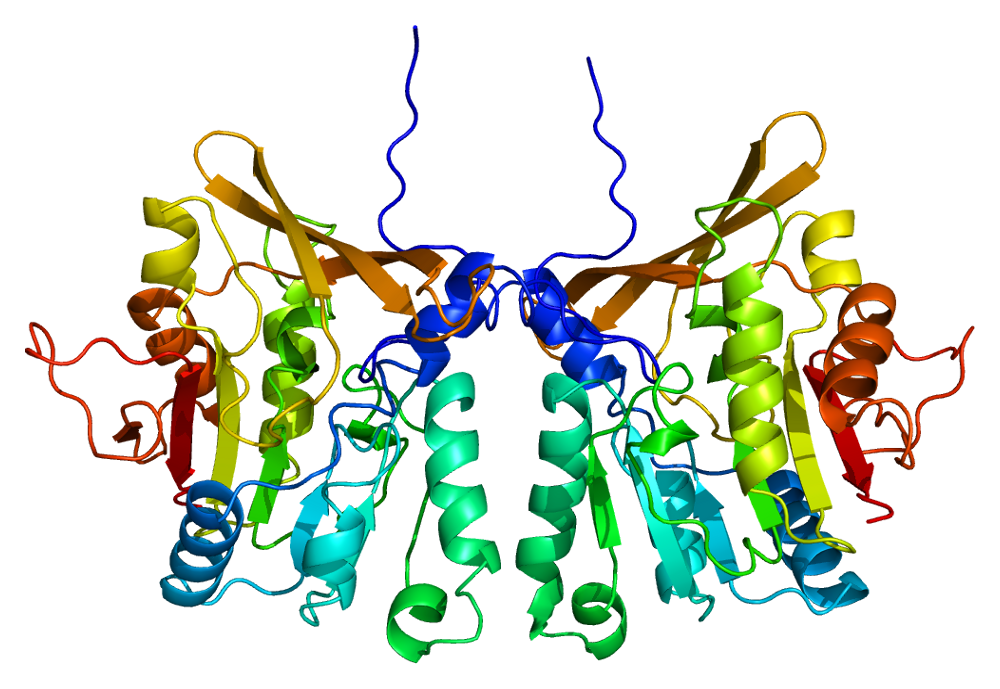

Identifiers
- Aliases: GNMT, HEL-S-182mP, glycine N-methyltransferase
- External IDs: OMIM: 606628; MGI: 1202304; GeneCards: GNMT
Available structures
PDB	Ortholog search: PDBe RCSB
PDB	List of PDB id codes 1R74, 2AZT
Enzyme activity
EC #	BRENDA	ExPASy	KEGG	MetaCyc
2.1.1.20	↗	↗	↗	↗

Gene location (Human)
Chr.	Chromosome 6 (human)
Band	6p21.1	Start	42,960,754 bp
Band	6p21.1	End	42,963,880 bp

Gene location (Mouse)
Chr.	Chromosome 17 (mouse)
Band	17 22.9 cM|17 C	Start	47,036,590 bp
Band	17 22.9 cM|17 C	End	47,040,094 bp
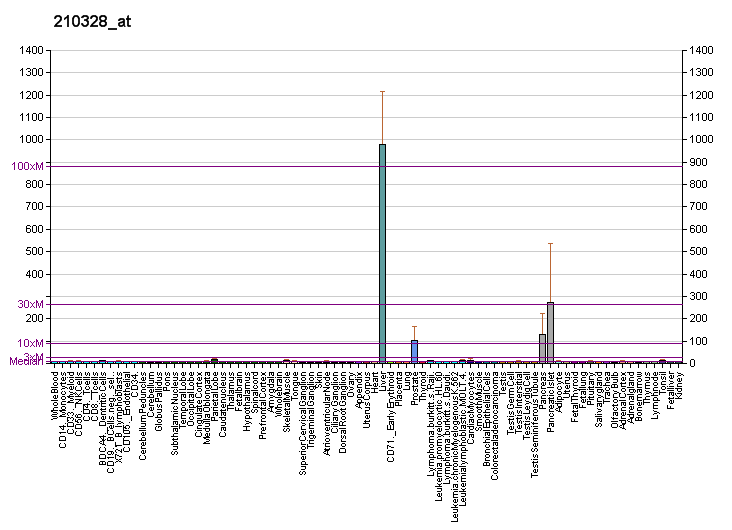
RNA expression pattern
Bgee	Human / Mouse (ortholog); Top expressed in: body of pancreas; right lobe of liver; body of stomach; prostate; olfactory zone of nasal mucosa; apex of heart; granulocyte; gastric mucosa; pituitary gland; anterior pituitary / Top expressed in: left lobe of liver; gallbladder; parotid gland; right kidney; vestibular membrane of cochlear duct; pyloric antrum; proximal tubule; human kidney; lip; submandibular gland; More reference expression data
BioGPS	More reference expression data
Gene ontology
Molecular function	methyltransferase activity; transferase activity; folic acid binding; protein binding; glycine binding; glycine N-methyltransferase activity; identical protein binding; S-adenosyl-L-methionine binding
Cellular component	cytoplasm; cytosol
Biological process	glycogen metabolic process; regulation of gluconeogenesis; methionine metabolic process; methylation; S-adenosylmethionine metabolic process; one-carbon metabolic process; protein homotetramerization; cellular nitrogen compound metabolic process; S-adenosylhomocysteine metabolic process; sarcosine metabolic process
Sources:Amigo / QuickGO
Orthologs
Databases	NCBI: entry; OMA: entry
Species	Human	Mouse
Entrez	27232	14711
Ensembl	ENSG00000124713	ENSMUSG00000002769
UniProt	Q14749	Q9QXF8
RefSeq (mRNA)	NM_018960; NM_001318865	NM_010321; NM_001364890
RefSeq (protein)	NP_001305794; NP_061833	NP_034451; NP_001351819
Location (UCSC)	Chr 6: 42.96 – 42.96 Mb	Chr 17: 47.04 – 47.04 Mb
PubMed search
- Wikidata
View/Edit Human	View/Edit Mouse

Glycine N-methyltransferase is an enzyme that in humans is encoded by the GNMT gene.

== Discovery ==
The enzyme was first described by Blumenstein and Williams (1960) in guinea pig liver. However, this enzyme was not purified until 1972 in the rabbit liver by Kerr. In 1984, Cook and Wagner demonstrated that a liver cytosolic folate binding protein is identical to GNMT. The human GMNT gene was cloned in 2000 by Chen and coworkers.

== Tissue distribution ==
GNMT is an abundant enzyme in liver cytosol and consists of 0.9% to 3% of the soluble protein present in liver. In addition to liver, GNMT activity has been found in a number of other tissues including pancreas and kidney. GNMT is most abundant in the peri-portal region of the liver and exocrine tissue of the pancreas. The GNMT proteins located in tissues that are actively in secretion, such as the proximal kidney tubules, the submaxillary glands and the intestinal mucosa. GNMT is also expressed in various neurons presented in the cerebral cortex, hippocampus, substantia nigra and cerebellum. The presence of GNMT in these cells suggests that this enzyme may play a role in secretion.

== Structure ==
The properties of GNMT protein from rabbits, rats and humans, either purified from liver/pancreas, or expressed in Escherichia coli, have been well characterized. All GNMTs have very similar molecular and kinetic properties. Comparison of the cDNA and protein sequences of human, rabbit, pig and rat GNMTs shows similarities of over 84% at the nucleotide level and about 90% at the amino acid level. All GNMTs are 130 kDa tetramers consisting of four identical subunits, each having a Mr of 32 kDa. The structure of recombinant rat, mouse and human GNMTs have been solved. The four nearly spherical subunits are arranged to form a flat and square tetramer with a large hole in the center. The active sites are located in the near center of each subunit.

== Function ==
Glycine N-methyltransferase catalyzes the synthesis of N-methylglycine (sarcosine) from glycine using S-adenosylmethionine (SAM) (AdoMet) as the methyl donor. GNMT acts as an enzyme to regulate the ratio of S-adenosylmethionine (SAM) to S-adenosylhomocysteine (SAH) (AdoHcy) and participates in the detoxification pathway in liver cells. GNMT competes with tRNA methyltransferases for SAM and the product, S-adenosylhomocysteine (SAH), is a potent inhibitor of tRNA methyltransferases and a relatively weak inhibitor of GNMT. GNMT regulates the relative levels of SAM and SAH. Since SAM is the methyl donor for almost all cellular methylation reactions. GNMT is therefore likely to regulate cellular methylation capacity. An endogenous ligand of GNMT, 5-methyltetrahydropteroylpentaglutamate (5-CH3-H4PteGIu5) is a powerful inhibitor of this enzyme. Thus, GNMT has been proposed to link the de novo synthesis of methyl groups to the ratio of SAM to SAH, which in turn serves as a bridge between methionine and one-carbon metabolism.

In addition to the methyltransferase activity, the 4S polycyclic aromatic hydrocarbon (PAH)-binding protein and GNMT are one and the same protein. The catalytic site resembles a molecular basket, unlike most other SAM-dependent methyltransferases, which therefore suggests that GNMT may be capable of capturing unidentified chemicals as a part of a detoxification process. Therefore, GNMT has been proposed to be a protein with diverse functionality.

== Clinical significance ==
GNMT has been shown to detoxify some environmental carcinogens such as polyaromatic hydrocarbons and aflatoxin.

There is mounting evidence that supports the involvement of GNMT deficiency in liver carcinogenesis.

== Inducer ==
The glycoside natural product 1,2,3,4,6-penta-O-galloyl-β-d-glucopyranoside (PGG) isolated from Paeonia lactiflora, an Asian flower plant, induces GNMT mRNA and protein expression in Huh7 human hepatoma cells.
