= Glycocyamine =

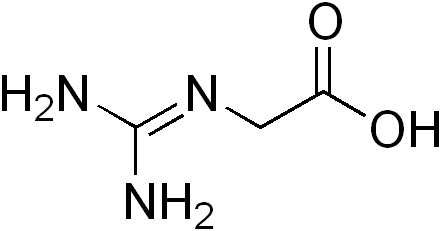
- Skeletal formula of a glycocyamine minor tautomer

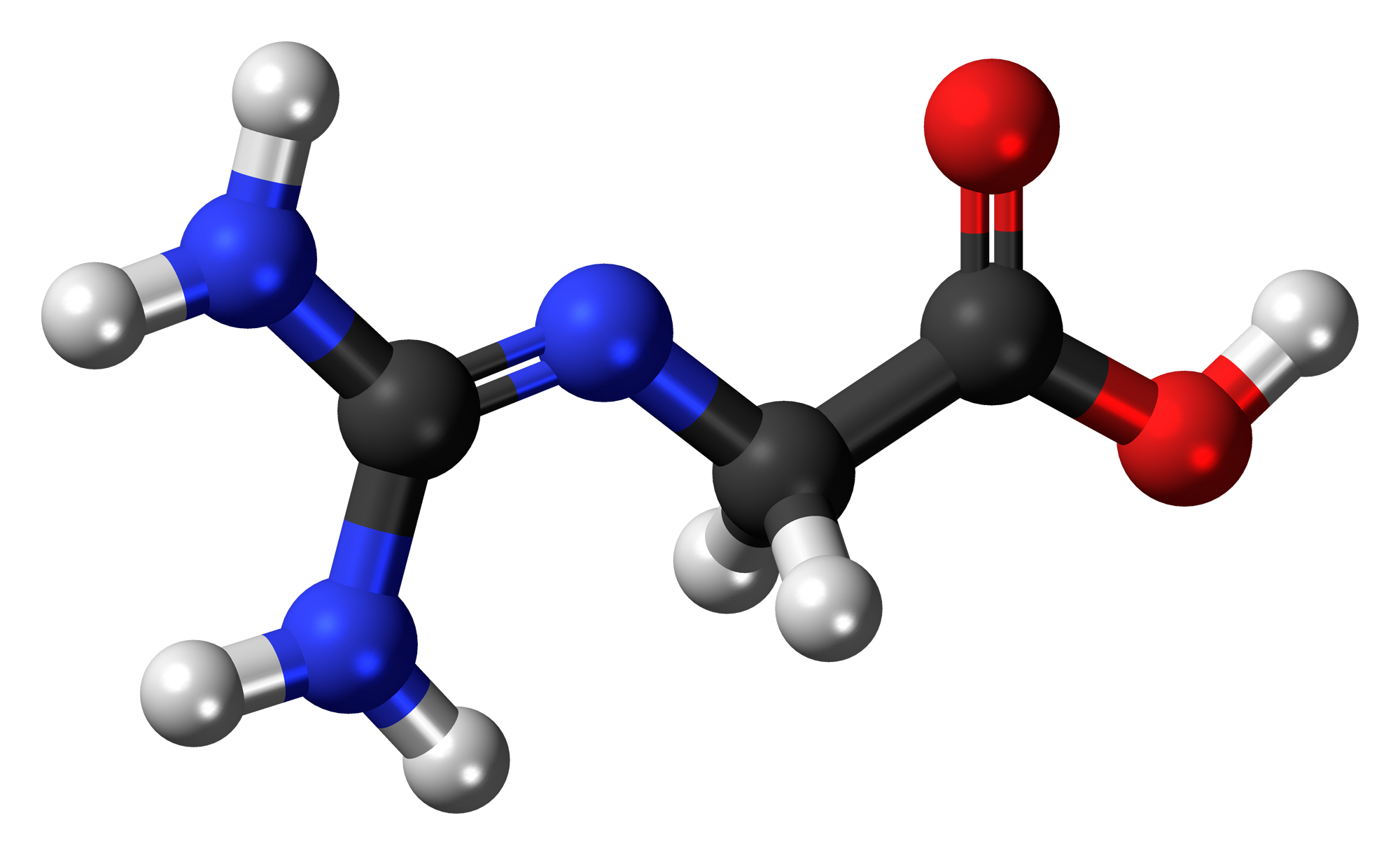
- Ball and stick model of a glycocyamine minor tautomer

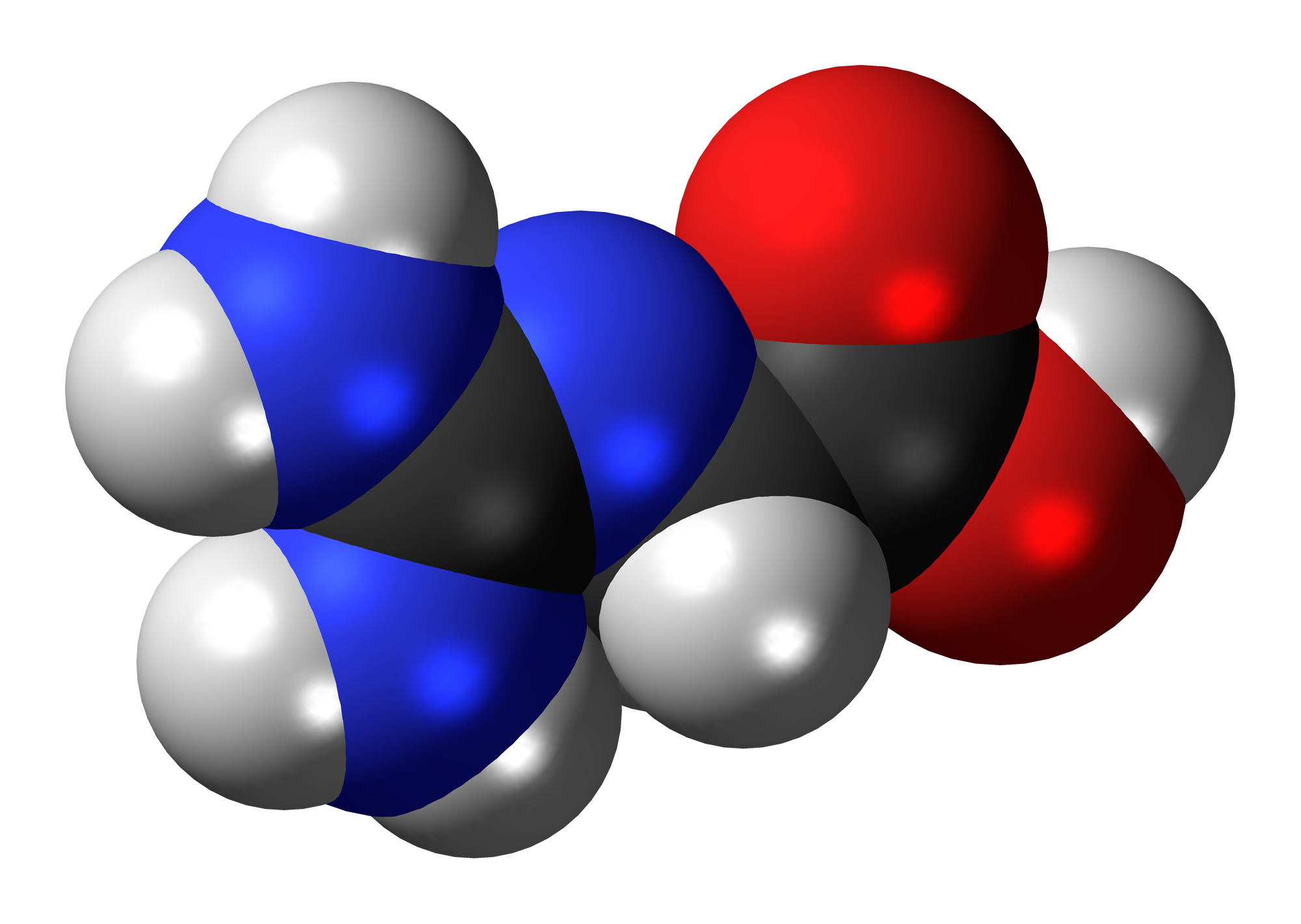
- Spacefill model of a glycocyamine minor tautomer

Names
- IUPAC name N-Carbamimidoylglycine
- Systematic IUPAC name 2-(Diaminomethylideneamino)acetic acid
- Other names 2-Guanidinoacetic acid

Identifiers
CAS Number	352-97-6
3D model (JSmol)	Interactive image
Beilstein Reference	1759179
ChEBI	CHEBI:16344
ChEMBL	ChEMBL281593
ChemSpider	743
DrugBank	DB02751
ECHA InfoCard	100.005.936
EC Number	206-529-5
KEGG	C00581
MeSH	glycocyamine
PubChem CID	763
UNII	GO52O1A04E
CompTox Dashboard (EPA)	DTXSID50861885
- InChI: InChI=1S/C3H7N3O2/c4-3(5)6-1-2(7)8/h1H2,(H,7,8)(H4,4,5,6) Key: BPMFZUMJYQTVII-UHFFFAOYSA-N
- SMILES: NC(=N)NCC(O)=O

Properties
Chemical formula	C_{3}H_{7}N_{3}O_{2}
Molar mass	117.108 g·mol^{−1}
Appearance	White crystals
Odor	Odourless
Melting point	300 °C (572 °F; 573 K)
log P	−1.11
Acidity (pK_{a})	3.414
Basicity (pK_{b})	10.583

Hazards
- GHS labelling
Pictograms	(GHS07: Exclamation mark)
Signal word	Warning
Hazard statements	H315, H319, H335
Precautionary statements	P261, P305+P351+P338

Related compounds
Related alkanoic acids	Sarcosine; Dimethylglycine; Creatine; N-Methyl-D-aspartic acid; beta-Methylamino-L-alanine; Guanidinopropionic acid
Related compounds	Dimethylacetamide
- Except where otherwise noted, data are given for materials in their standard state (at 25 °C [77 °F], 100 kPa). verify (what is ?) Infobox references

Glycocyamine (or guanidinoacetate) is a metabolite of glycine in which the amino group has been converted into a guanidine by guanylation (transfer of a guanidine group from arginine). In vertebrate organism it is then transformed into creatine by methylation.

Glycocyamine is used as a supplement and as a feed additive in poultry farming. However, the metabolism of creatine from glycocyamine in the liver causes a depletion of methyl groups. This causes homocysteine levels to rise, which has been shown to produce cardiovascular and skeletal problems. Glycocyamine plays a role in the metabolism of the amino acids serine, threonine, and proline.

== Production ==
=== Biochemical synthesis ===
Glycocyamine is formed in the mammalian organism primarily in the kidneys by transferring the guanidine group of L-arginine by the enzyme L-Arg:Gly-amidinotransferase (AGAT) to the amino acid glycine. From L-arginine, ornithine is thus produced, which is metabolized in the urea cycle by carbamoylation to citrulline.

In a further step, glycocyamine is methylated to creatine with S-adenosyl methionine by the enzyme guanidinoacetate N-methyltransferase (GAMT). The creatine is released into the bloodstream.

=== Chemical synthesis ===
Guanidinoacetic acid was first prepared in 1861 by Adolph Strecker by reaction of cyanamide with glycine in aqueous solution:

Glycine can also be converted to glycocyamine with S-methylisothiourea or with O-alkylisoureas as a guanylation agent.

The recent patent literature describes the synthesis of glycocyamine by catalytic oxidation of ethanolamine to glycine and subsequent reaction with cyanamide in aqueous solution in high yield, analogous to the synthesis of creatine starting from 2-methylaminoethanol via sarcosine.

This synthetic route suppresses the formation of toxic dihydrotriazine and other undesired by-products (such as iminodiacetic acid).

== Properties ==
Industrially produced guanidinoacetic acid is sold as a white (to yellowish) fine powder, which is granulated for improve handling, metering and uptake with starch into aggregates with a mean diameter of 200-400 microns. The granulate provides a long-term stability of glycocyamine. The shelf Life of guanidinoacetate in acidic aqueous solution is significantly higher than that of creatine, which cyclizes to creatinine under acid catalysis.

== Uses ==
=== As a supplement ===
A series of studies showed that a combination of betaine and glycocyamine improves the symptoms of patients with chronic illness, including heart disease, without toxicity. Betaine can provide a methyl group to glycocyamine, via methionine, for the formation of creatine. In overall, such treatment led to less fatigue, greater strength and endurance, and an improved sense of well-being. The patients with cardiac decompensation (arteriosclerosis or rheumatic disease) and congestive heart failure had improved cardiac function. The patients gained weight (improved nitrogen balance) and saw lessened symptoms of arthritis and asthma and increased libido, and those people suffering from hypertension experienced transient reduced blood pressure. Also the studies shows the increase of glucose tolerance in both diabetic subjects and subjects without diabetes.

=== As a feed additive ===
Guanidinoacetic acid is a nutritional feed additive approved by the European Commission for chickens for fattening, weaned piglets and pigs for fattening. It is supposed to lead with a "vegetarian diet" (meaning without feeding of animal protein) to higher feed conversion, higher weight gain and improved muscle increase already at a low dosage (600 g/to feed).

Possible benefits of glycocyamine supplementation can not yet be conclusively assessed, neither in other breeding, fattening and domestic animals nor for high-performance athletes, analogous to the glycocyamine metabolite creatine. The simultaneous intake of methyl providing substances such as betaine appears advisable because of the risk of homocysteine formation with glycocyamine alone.

== See also ==
- Guanidinoacetate kinase
