= N-Methylacetamide =

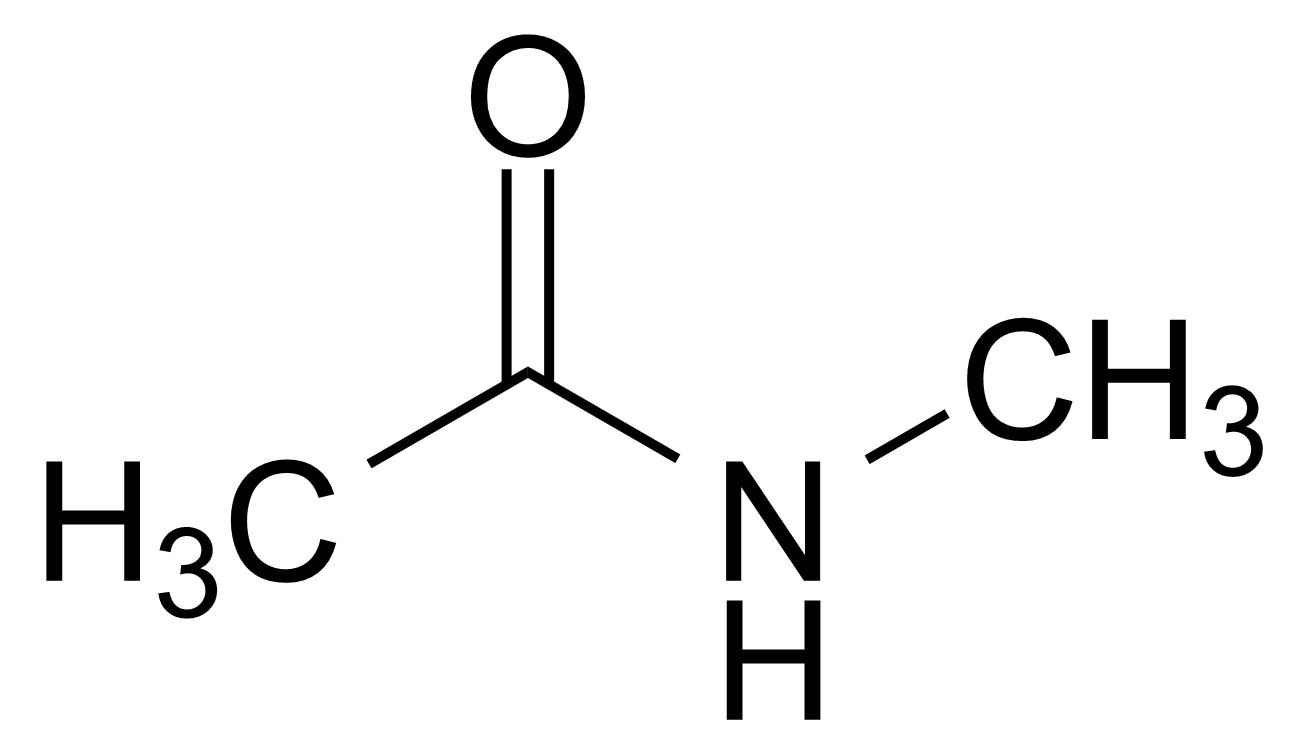

Names
- Preferred IUPAC name N-Methylacetamide
- Other names: Methyl acetamide; Monomethylacetamide

Identifiers
CAS Number	79-16-3
3D model (JSmol)	Interactive image
ChEBI	CHEBI:87321
ChEMBL	ChEMBL11544
ChemSpider	6334
ECHA InfoCard	100.001.075
EC Number	201-182-6
PubChem CID	6582
UNII	V0T777481M
UN number	85335
CompTox Dashboard (EPA)	DTXSID0047167
- InChI: InChI=1S/C3H7NO/c1-3(5)4-2/h1-2H3,(H,4,5) Key: OHLUUHNLEMFGTQ-UHFFFAOYSA-N
- SMILES: CC(=O)NC

Properties
Chemical formula	C_{3}H_{7}NO
Molar mass	73.095 g·mol^{−1}
Appearance	Colourless solid with faint odour
Density	0.94 g·cm^{−3}
Melting point	27–30.6 °C (80.6–87.1 °F; 300.1–303.8 K)
Boiling point	206–208 °C (403–406 °F; 479–481 K)
Solubility	Water; Chloroform; Ethanol; Ether; Acetone; Benzene
Vapor pressure	1.1 hPa (50 °C)
Refractive index (n_{D})	1.433 (20 °C)

Hazards
- GHS labelling
Pictograms	(GHS08: Health hazard)
Signal word	Danger
Hazard statements	H360D
Precautionary statements	P201, P202, P280, P308+P313, P405, P501
- Except where otherwise noted, data are given for materials in their standard state (at 25 °C [77 °F], 100 kPa). Infobox references

N-Methylacetamide is a chemical compound from the amides group. The compound is listed as very high concern by the European Chemicals Agency (ECHA).

== Generation ==
N-methylacetamide can be obtained by reacting hot acetic acid or acetic anhydride with methylamine. It can also be prepared by reacting N,N′-dimethylurea with acetic acid or by reacting acetone oxime with sulfuric acid.

== Characteristics ==
N-Methylacetamide is a flammable, difficult to ignite, hygroscopic, crystalline, colourless solid with a faint odor that is soluble in water. Several isomeric forms are known. In solution, it is 97–100% present as the Z isomer with a polymeric structure. The compound has a high dielectric constant of 191.3 at 32 °C.

== Use ==
N-Methylacetamide is used as an intermediate in the production of agrochemicals and as a solvent in electrochemistry.

== See also ==
- Dimethylacetamide
- Dimethylformamide
- N-Methylformamide
