= Guanidinoacetate kinase =

Identifiers
- EC no.: 2.7.3.1
- CAS no.: 9026-60-2

Databases
- IntEnz: IntEnz view
- BRENDA: BRENDA entry
- ExPASy: NiceZyme view
- KEGG: KEGG entry
- MetaCyc: metabolic pathway
- PRIAM: profile
- PDB structures: RCSB PDB PDBe PDBsum
- Gene Ontology: AmiGO / QuickGO
Search
- PMC: articles
- PubMed: articles
- NCBI: proteins

Guanidinoacetate kinase (EC 2.7.3.1) is an enzyme that catalyzes the chemical reaction

ATP +
glycocyamine
ADP +
phosphoguanidinoacetic acid

The enzyme characterised from several species of polychaete worms converts glycocyamine to phosphoguanidinoacetic acid by transferring a phosphate group from the cofactor, adenosine triphosphate (ATP), which is converted to adenosine diphosphate (ADP).

Guanidinoacetate kinase is a transferase, specifically one that transfers phosphorus-containing groups (phosphotransferases) with a nitrogenous group as acceptor. The systematic name of this enzyme class is ATP:guanidinoacetate N-phosphotransferase. This enzyme is also called glycocyamine kinase.
