= Sarcosine =

Amino acid

- Skeletal formula of sarcosine

Names
- IUPAC name N-Methylglycine
- Systematic IUPAC name (Methylamino)acetic acid

Identifiers
CAS Number	107-97-1
3D model (JSmol)	Interactive image
Beilstein Reference	1699442
ChEBI	CHEBI:15611
ChEMBL	ChEMBL304383
ChemSpider	1057
ECHA InfoCard	100.003.217
EC Number	203-538-6
Gmelin Reference	2018
KEGG	C00213
MeSH	Sarcosine
PubChem CID	1088
UNII	Z711V88R5F
CompTox Dashboard (EPA)	DTXSID1047025
- InChI: InChI=1S/C3H7NO2/c1-4-2-3(5)6/h4H,2H2,1H3,(H,5,6) Key: FSYKKLYZXJSNPZ-UHFFFAOYSA-N
- SMILES: CNCC(O)=O

Properties
Chemical formula	C_{3}H_{7}NO_{2}
Molar mass	89.094 g·mol^{−1}
Appearance	White solid
Odor	Odourless
Density	1.093 g/mL
Melting point	208 to 212 °C (406 to 414 °F; 481 to 485 K) experimental
Solubility in water	1480 g L^{−1} (at 20 °C)
log P	0.599
Acidity (pK_{a})	2.36
Basicity (pK_{b})	11.64
UV-vis (λ_{max})	260 nm
Absorbance	0.05

Thermochemistry
Heat capacity (C)	128.9 J K^{−1} mol^{−1}
Std enthalpy of formation (Δ_{f}H^{⦵}_{298})	−513.50–−512.98 kJ mol^{−1}
Std enthalpy of combustion (Δ_{c}H^{⦵}_{298})	−1667.84–−1667.54 kJ mol^{−1}

Related compounds
Related alkanoic acids	Dimethylglycine; Glycocyamine; Creatine; N-Methyl-D-aspartic acid; beta-Methylamino-L-alanine; Guanidinopropionic acid
Related compounds	Dimethylacetamide
- Except where otherwise noted, data are given for materials in their standard state (at 25 °C [77 °F], 100 kPa). verify (what is ?) Infobox references

Sarcosine, also known as N-methylglycine, or monomethylglycine, is a non-proteinogenic amino acid with the formula CH_{3}N(H)CH_{2}CO_{2}H. It is the N-methyl derivative of glycine, with a secondary amine in place of the primary amine, and occurs naturally in muscles and other body tissues as an intermediate in the metabolism of choline to glycine. It was first isolated and named by the German chemist Justus von Liebig in 1847.

Sarcosine is ubiquitous in biological materials. It is used in manufacturing biodegradable surfactants and toothpastes as well as in other applications. It is also a reagent in organic synthesis. It has a mildly sweet taste.

Pharmacologically, sarcosine functions as a competitive inhibitor of the glycine transporter type 1 (GlyT1), a co-agonist at the glycine binding site of the NMDA receptor, and, at higher concentrations, an agonist at the strychnine-sensitive glycine receptor. These properties have led to its investigation as an adjunctive treatment in schizophrenia and major depressive disorder. Sarcosine has also been identified as an oncometabolite in prostate cancer, where elevated levels correlate with disease progression and metastatic potential.

== Chemistry ==
Sarcosine is an achiral, colourless crystalline solid. It exists at neutral pH as the zwitterion CH_{3}N^{+}(H)_{2}CH_{2}CO_{2}^{−}, It has a melting point of 208–212 °C (with decomposition) and is highly soluble in water (1480 g/L at 20 °C). Like other amino acids, sarcosine exists as a zwitterion at physiological pH, with the amine group protonated and the carboxyl group deprotonated. Like most other amino acids, sarcosine converts to a cation at low pH and an anion at high pH, with the respective formulas CH_{3}N^{+}(H)_{2}CH_{2}CO_{2}H and CH_{3}N(H)CH_{2}CO_{2}^{−}. The pK_{a} values are approximately 2.21 (carboxyl group) and 10.2 (amino group).

=== Industrial synthesis ===
Sarcosine can be produced industrially from esters of chloroacetic acid.

=== Surfactants ===
A variety of surfactants are produced from sarcosine, for instance sodium lauroyl sarcosinate.

== Biochemistry ==
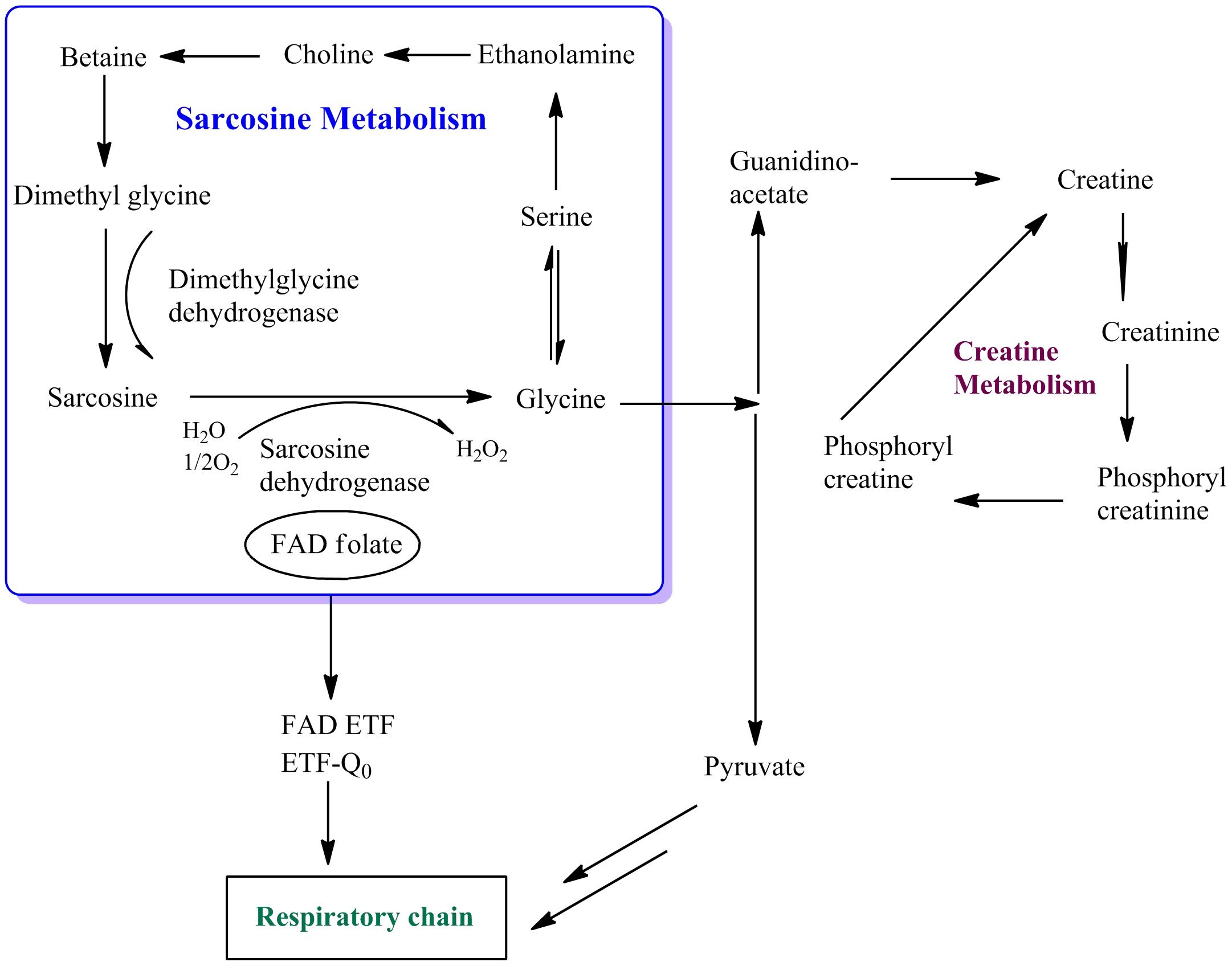
Simplified scheme of sarcosine–glycine interconversion.

Sarcosine is an intermediate and byproduct in glycine synthesis and degradation. Sarcosine is metabolized to glycine by the enzyme sarcosine dehydrogenase, while glycine-N-methyltransferase generates sarcosine from glycine. Sarcosine is an amino acid derivative that is naturally found in muscles and other body tissues. In the laboratory, it may be synthesized from chloroacetic acid and methylamine. Sarcosine is an intermediate in the metabolism of choline to glycine.

Sarcosine, like the related compounds dimethylglycine (DMG) and trimethylglycine (betaine, TMG), is formed via the metabolism of nutrients such as choline and methionine, which both contain methyl groups used in a wide range of biochemical reactions. Sarcosine is rapidly degraded to glycine, which, in addition to its importance as a constituent of protein, plays a significant role in various physiological processes as a prime metabolic source of components of living cells such as glutathione, creatine, purines and serine. The concentration of sarcosine in blood serum of normal human subjects is 1.4 ± 0.6 micromolar.

== Distribution ==
In humans, sarcosine is found at relatively low concentrations in the extracellular compartment, mitochondria, and peroxisomes. Tissues with measurable sarcosine concentrations include skeletal muscle and the prostate gland. Its cellular levels are tightly regulated by the balance between GNMT-mediated synthesis and SARDH/PIPOX-mediated catabolism.

== Pharmacology ==
=== Pharmacodynamics ===
Sarcosine acts as a competitive inhibitor of GlyT1, a glycine transporter that is predominantly expressed on glial cells and is responsible for the reuptake of glycine from the synaptic cleft in the central nervous system. By blocking GlyT1, sarcosine elevates the extracellular concentration of glycine in the vicinity of NMDA receptors, thereby augmenting NMDA receptor-mediated neurotransmission.

In addition to its indirect enhancement of NMDA receptor function via GlyT1 blockade, sarcosine directly acts as a co-agonist at the glycine binding site (also termed the GluN1 site) of the NMDA receptor. It increases NMDA-mediated currents in a dose-dependent manner. Sarcosine differs from glycine as a co-agonist in that it produces markedly less NMDA receptor desensitization at subsaturating concentrations. At equivalent receptor occupancy (EC_{20} to EC_{50}), sarcosine significantly slowed the rate of glycine-dependent desensitisation compared with glycine itself, whereas the rate of glycine-independent desensitisation was similar for both ligands.

At concentrations higher than those required for GlyT1 inhibition or NMDA receptor co-agonism, sarcosine additionally activates strychnine-sensitive glycine receptors (GlyRs). It evokes a chloride current that is dose-dependent, inhibited by strychnine, and shows a lack of additivity with glycine. Sarcosine is less potent and efficacious than glycine at GlyRs, potentially due to steric constraints imposed by the N-methyl group within the glycine binding site on the receptor. The GlyR agonism of sarcosine is relevant at concentrations frequently used in experimental settings (0.5–2 mM), complicating the pharmacological interpretation.

Aside from effects on glycine-related structures and NMDA receptors, sarcosine has been shown to modulate AMPA receptor function and downstream mTOR signalling in rodent models of depression. Long-term sarcosine administration (21 days) ameliorated chronic unpredictable stress-induced depressive behaviour in rats In the rat forced swim test, a single systemic dose of sarcosine produced rapid antidepressant-like effects accompanied by increased phosphorylation of mTOR and its upstream kinases in the hippocampus, and these behavioural and molecular effects were abolished by pretreatment with the AMPA receptor antagonist NBQX or the mTOR inhibitor rapamycin. Sarcosine also increased phosphorylation of the GluR1 subunit at the protein kinase A site Ser845, a change commonly interpreted as enhanced AMPA receptor membrane insertion.

Cryo-EM study published in 2025 resolved the structure of human GlyT1 in complex with sarcosine at 2.8 Å resolution, revealing the transporter in an occluded conformation.

=== Pharmacokinetics ===
Following oral administration, sarcosine is absorbed from the gastrointestinal tract. It is metabolised to glycine primarily by SARDH in the mitochondrial matrix and to a lesser extent by PIPOX in peroxisomes.

== Research ==
=== Schizophrenia ===
Early evidence suggests sarcosine is an effective and well-tolerated adjuvant to many antipsychotics except clozapine for the treatment of schizophrenia, showing significant reductions in both positive and negative symptoms.

=== Prostate cancer ===
Sarcosine has been debated as a biomarker for prostate cancer cells. Other research has suggested that sarcosine plays an active role in the progression of prostate cancer, as addition of sarcosine to prostate epithelial cells caused the emergence of a new invasive phenotype.

== History ==
Sarcosine was first isolated and named by the German chemist Justus von Liebig in 1847.

Jacob Volhard first synthesized it in 1862 while working in the lab of Hermann Kolbe. Prior to the synthesis of sarcosine, it had long been known to be a hydrolysis product of creatine, a compound found in meat extract. Under this assumption, by preparing the compound with methylamine and monochloroacetic acid, Volhard proved that sarcosine was N-methylglycine.

== See also ==
- Glycine
- Dimethylglycine
- Trimethylglycine
- Oncometabolism
