= N-Methyl-D-aspartic acid =

Amino acid derivative

- Stereo, skeletal formula of N-methyl-D-aspartic acid

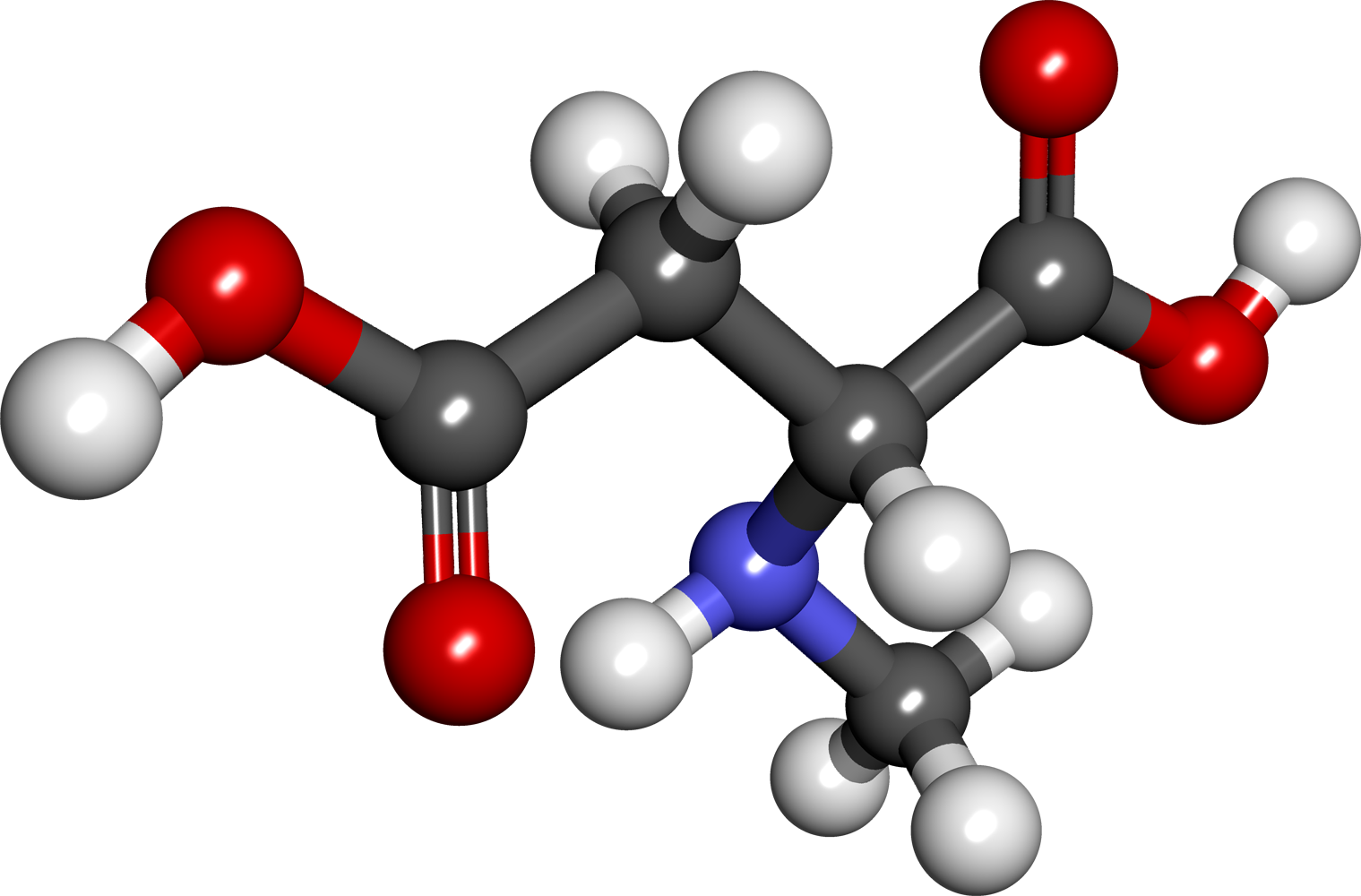
- Ball and stick model of N-methyl-D-aspartic acid

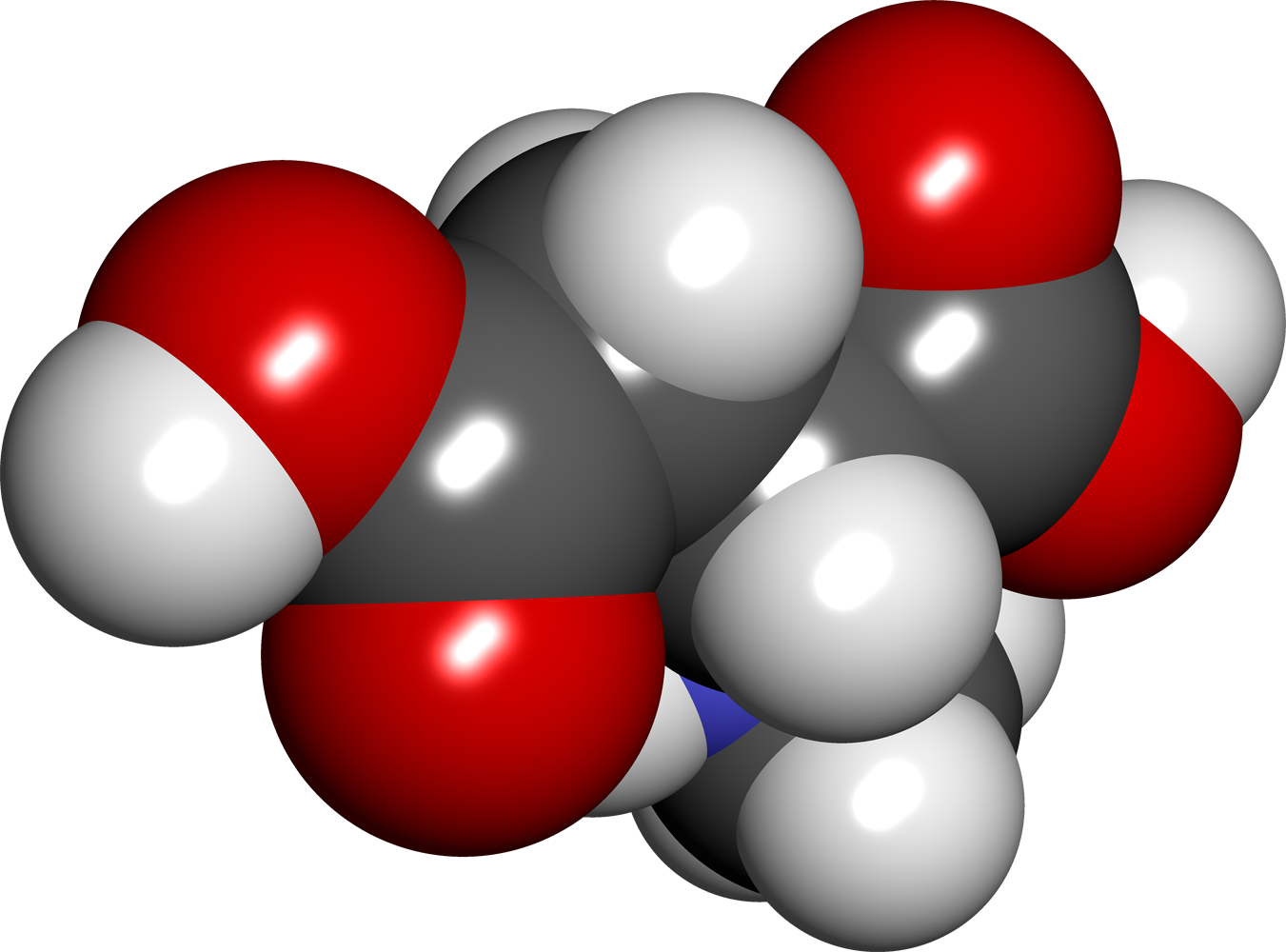
- Spacefill model of N-methyl-D-aspartic acid

Names
- IUPAC name N-Methyl-D-aspartic acid
- Systematic IUPAC name (2R)-2-(Methylamino)butanedioic acid
- Other names N-Methylaspartate; N-Methyl-D-aspartate; NMDA

Identifiers
CAS Number	6384-92-5
3D model (JSmol)	Interactive image
Beilstein Reference	1724431
ChEBI	CHEBI:31882
ChEMBL	ChEMBL291278
ChemSpider	21436
IUPHAR/BPS	4268
KEGG	C12269
MeSH	N-Methylaspartate
PubChem CID	22880
RTECS number	CI9457000
UNII	1903B9Q6PI
CompTox Dashboard (EPA)	DTXSID8041082
- InChI: InChI=1 S/C5H9NO4/c1-6-3(5(9)10)2-4(7)8/h3,6H,2H2,1H3,(H,7,8)(H,9,10)/t3-/m1/s1 Key: HOKKHZGPKSLGJE-GSVOUGTGSA-N
- SMILES: CN[C@H](CC(=O)O)C(=O)O

Properties
Chemical formula	C_{5}H_{9}NO_{4}
Molar mass	147.130 g·mol^{−1}
Appearance	White, opaque crystals
Odor	Odorless
Melting point	189 to 190 °C (372 to 374 °F; 462 to 463 K)
log P	1.39
Acidity (pK_{a})	2.206
Basicity (pK_{b})	11.791

Hazards
- Lethal dose or concentration (LD, LC)
LD_{50} (median dose)	137 mg kg^{−1} (intraperitoneal, mouse)

Related compounds
Related amino acid derivatives	Sarcosine; Dimethylglycine; beta-Methylamine-L-alanine
Related compounds	Dimethylacetamide
- Except where otherwise noted, data are given for materials in their standard state (at 25 °C [77 °F], 100 kPa). verify (what is ?) Infobox references

N-methyl-D-aspartic acid, or N-methyl-D-aspartate (NMDA), is an amino acid derivative that acts as a specific agonist at the NMDA receptor mimicking the action of glutamate, the neurotransmitter which normally acts at that receptor. Unlike glutamate, NMDA only binds to and regulates the NMDA receptor and has no effect on other glutamate receptors (such as those for AMPA and kainate). NMDA receptors are particularly important when they become overactive during, for example, alcohol withdrawal, as this causes symptoms such as agitation and, sometimes, epileptiform seizures.

== Biological function ==
In 1962, J.C. Watkins reported synthesizing NMDA, an isomer of the previously known N-Methyl-DL-aspartic-acid. NMDA is a water-soluble D-alpha-amino acid — an aspartic acid derivative with an N-methyl substituent and D-configuration — found across Chordates from lancelets to mammals. At homeostatic levels NMDA plays an essential role as a neurotransmitter and neuroendocrine regulator. At increased but sub–toxic levels NMDA becomes neuroprotective. In excessive amounts NMDA is an excitotoxin. Behavioral neuroscience research utilizes NMDA excitotoxicity to induce lesions in specific regions of an animal subject's brain or spinal cord to study behavioral changes.

The mechanism of action for the NMDA receptor is a specific agonist binding to its NR2 subunits, and then a non-specific cation channel is opened, which can allow the passage of Ca^{2+} and Na^{+} into the cell and K^{+} out of the cell. Therefore, NMDA receptors will only open if glutamate is in the synapse and concurrently the postsynaptic membrane is already depolarized - acting as coincidence detectors at the neuronal level. The excitatory postsynaptic potential (EPSP) produced by activation of an NMDA receptor also increases the concentration of Ca^{2+} in the cell. The Ca^{2+} can in turn function as a second messenger in various signaling pathways. This process is modulated by a number of endogenous and exogenous compounds and plays a key role in a wide range of physiological (such as memory) and pathological processes (such as excitotoxicity).

NMDA receptor activated

== Antagonists ==
Examples of antagonists, or more appropriately named receptor channel blockers, of the NMDA receptor are APV, amantadine, dextromethorphan (DXM), ketamine, magnesium, tiletamine, phencyclidine (PCP), riluzole, memantine, methoxetamine (MXE), methoxphenidine (MXP) and kynurenic acid. While dizocilpine is generally considered to be the prototypical NMDA receptor blocker and is the most common agent used in research, animal studies have demonstrated some amount of neurotoxicity, which may or may not also occur in humans. These compounds are commonly referred to as NMDA receptor antagonists.

== See also ==
- Anti-NMDA receptor encephalitis
