= Acetone oxime =

Names
- Preferred IUPAC name N-Hydroxypropan-2-imine
- Other names Acetoxime; N-Hydroxy-2-propanimine; Methyl methyl ketoxime; 2-Propanone oxime

Identifiers
CAS Number	127-06-0
3D model (JSmol)	Interactive image
ChEBI	CHEBI:15349
ChemSpider	60524
ECHA InfoCard	100.004.383
EC Number	204-820-1
KEGG	C01995
PubChem CID	67180
UNII	QX74TFD64T
CompTox Dashboard (EPA)	DTXSID6020010
- InChI: InChI=1S/C3H7NO/c1-3(2)4-5/h5H,1-2H3 Key: PXAJQJMDEXJWFB-UHFFFAOYSA-N; InChI=1/C3H7NO/c1-3(2)4-5/h5H,1-2H3 Key: PXAJQJMDEXJWFB-UHFFFAOYAK
- SMILES: CC(=NO)C

Properties
Chemical formula	C_{3}H_{7}NO
Molar mass	73.095 g·mol^{−1}
Appearance	White needle like crystals
Density	0.901 g/mL
Melting point	60 to 63 °C (140 to 145 °F; 333 to 336 K)
Boiling point	135 °C (275 °F; 408 K)
Solubility in water	330 g/L (20 °C)
Magnetic susceptibility (χ)	−44.42·10^{−6} cm^{3}/mol

Hazards
- Occupational safety and health (OHS/OSH)
Main hazards	May be harmful if swallowed
- GHS labelling
Pictograms	(GHS02: Flammable) (GHS05: Corrosive) (GHS07: Exclamation mark) (GHS08: Health hazard)
Signal word	Danger
Hazard statements	H228, H302, H317, H318, H351
Precautionary statements	P201, P202, P210, P240, P241, P261, P264, P270, P272, P280, P281, P301+P312, P302+P352, P305+P351+P338, P308+P313, P310, P321, P330, P333+P313, P363, P370+P378, P405, P501
NFPA 704 (fire diamond)	2 2 0
Flash point	60 °C (140 °F; 333 K)
- Lethal dose or concentration (LD, LC)
LD_{50} (median dose)	4,000 mg/kg Intraperitoneal-mouse
- Except where otherwise noted, data are given for materials in their standard state (at 25 °C [77 °F], 100 kPa). Infobox references

Acetone oxime (acetoxime) is the organic compound with the formula (CH_{3})_{2}CNOH. It is the simplest example of a ketoxime. It is a white crystalline solid that is soluble in water, ethanol, ether, chloroform, and ligroin. It is used as a reagent in organic synthesis.

Acetone oxime (acetoxime) was first prepared and named in 1882 by the German chemist Victor Meyer and his Swiss student Alois Janny.

== Preparation ==
Acetone oxime is synthesized by the condensation of acetone and hydroxylamine in the presence of HCl:

(CH_{3})_{2}CO + H_{2}NOH → (CH_{3})_{2}CNOH + H_{2}O

It can also be generated via ammoxidation of acetone in the presence of hydrogen peroxide over a titanium silicalite (TS-1) catalyst.

== Uses ==
Acetone oxime has been used as a corrosion inhibitor (oxygen scavenger) as a less toxic alternative to hydrazine. It is also useful in the determination of ketones, cobalt and in organic synthesis.
