= Dimethylacetamide =

- Skeletal formula of dimethylacetamide

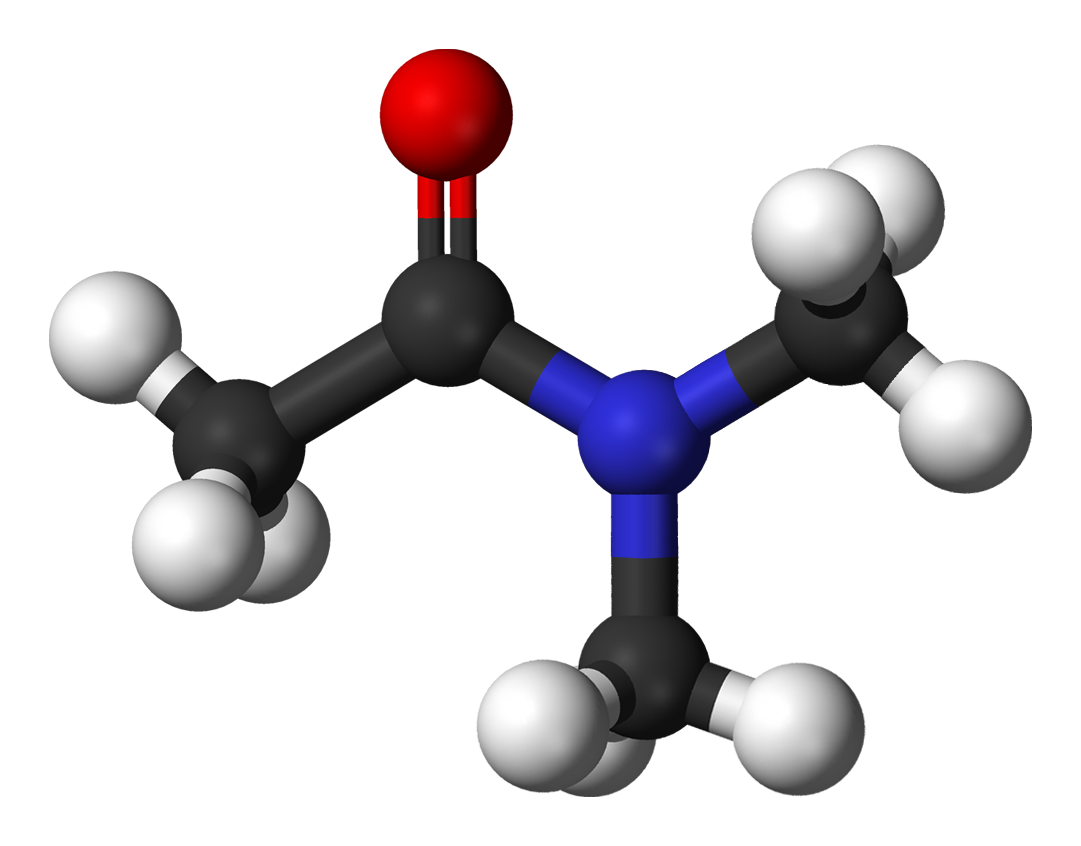
- Ball and stick model of dimethylacetamide

Names
- Preferred IUPAC name N,N-Dimethylacetamide

Identifiers
| CAS Number | 127-19-5 |
| 3D model (JSmol) | Interactive image |
| Abbreviations | DMA, DMAC, DMAc |
| Beilstein Reference | 1737614 |
| ChEBI | CHEBI:84254 |
| ChEMBL | ChEMBL11873 |
| ChemSpider | 29107 |
| ECHA InfoCard | 100.004.389 |
| EC Number | 204-826-4 |
| MeSH | dimethylacetamide |
| PubChem CID | 31374 |
| RTECS number | AB7700000 |
| UNII | JCV5VDB3HY |
| CompTox Dashboard (EPA) | DTXSID5020499 |
- InChI: InChI=1S/C4H9NO/c1-4(6)5(2)3/h1-3H3 Key: FXHOOIRPVKKKFG-UHFFFAOYSA-N
- SMILES: CN(C)C(C)=O

Properties
| Chemical formula | C_{4}H_{9}NO |
| Molar mass | 87.122 g·mol^{−1} |
| Appearance | Colorless liquid |
| Odor | Ammoniacal |
| Density | 0.937 g/mL |
| Melting point | −20 °C (−4 °F; 253 K) |
| Boiling point | 165.1 °C; 329.1 °F; 438.2 K |
| Solubility in water | Miscible |
| log P | −0.253 |
| Vapor pressure | 300 Pa |
| UV-vis (λ_{max}) | 270 nm |
| Refractive index (n_{D}) | 1.4375 |
| Viscosity | 0.945 mPa·s |

Thermochemistry
| Heat capacity (C) | 178.2 J/(K·mol) |
| Std enthalpy of formation (Δ_{f}H^{⦵}_{298}) | −300.1 kJ/mol |
| Std enthalpy of combustion (Δ_{c}H^{⦵}_{298}) | −2.5835–−2.5805 MJ/mol |

Hazards
- GHS labelling
| Pictograms | (GHS07: Exclamation mark) (GHS08: Health hazard) |
| Signal word | Danger |
| Hazard statements | H312, H319, H332, H360 |
| Precautionary statements | P280, P308+P313 |
| NFPA 704 (fire diamond) | 2 2 0 |
| Flash point | 63 °C (145 °F; 336 K) |
| Autoignition temperature | 490 °C (914 °F; 763 K) |
| Explosive limits | 1.8–11.5% |
- Lethal dose or concentration (LD, LC)
| LD_{50} (median dose) | 2.24 g/kg (dermal, rabbit); 4.3 g/kg (oral, rat); 4.8 g/kg (oral, rat); 4.62 g/kg (oral, mouse) |
| LC_{50} (median concentration) | 2475 ppm (rat, 1 h) |
- NIOSH (US health exposure limits)
| PEL (Permissible) | TWA 10 ppm (35 mg/m^{3}) [skin] |
| REL (Recommended) | TWA 10 ppm (35 mg/m^{3}) [skin] |
| IDLH (Immediate danger) | 300 ppm |

Related compounds
| Related compounds | dimethylformamide; acetamide; methylpyrrolidone |
- Except where otherwise noted, data are given for materials in their standard state (at 25 °C [77 °F], 100 kPa). verify (what is ?) Infobox references

Dimethylacetamide (DMAc or DMA) is the organic compound with the formula CH_{3}C(O)N(CH_{3})_{2}. This colorless, water-miscible, high-boiling liquid is commonly used as a polar solvent in organic synthesis. DMA is miscible with most other solvents, although it is poorly soluble in aliphatic hydrocarbons.

== Synthesis and production ==
DMA is prepared commercially by the reaction of dimethylamine with acetic anhydride or acetic acid. Dehydration of the salt of dimethylamine and acetic acid also furnishes this compound:

CH_{3}CO_{2}H·HN(CH_{3})_{2} → H_{2}O + CH_{3}CON(CH_{3})_{2}

Dimethylacetamide can also be produced by the reaction of dimethylamine with methyl acetate.

The separation and purification of the product is carried out by multistage distillation in rectification columns. DMA is obtained with essentially quantitive (99%) yield referred to methyl acetate.

== Reactions and applications ==
The chemical reactions of dimethylacetamide are typical of N,N-disubstituted amides. Hydrolysis of the acyl-N bond occurs in the presence of acids:

CH_{3}CON(CH_{3})_{2} + H_{2}O + HCl → CH_{3}COOH + (CH_{3})_{2}NH_{2}^{+}Cl^{−}

However, it is resistant to bases. For this reason DMA is a useful solvent for reactions involving strong bases such as sodium hydroxide.

Dimethylacetamide is commonly used as a solvent for fibers (e.g., polyacrylonitrile, spandex) or in the adhesive industry. It is also employed in the production of pharmaceuticals and plasticizers as a reaction medium.

A solution of lithium chloride in DMAc (LiCl/DMAc) can dissolve cellulose. Unlike many other cellulose solvents, LiCl/DMAc gives a molecular dispersion, i.e. a "true solution". For this reason, it is used in gel permeation chromatography to determine the molar mass distribution of cellulose samples.

Dimethylacetamide is also used as an excipient in drugs, e.g. in Vumon (teniposide), Busulfex (busulfan) or Amsidine (amsacrine).

== Toxicity ==
Dimethylacetamide, like most simple alkyl amides, is of low acute toxicity. Chronic exposure can cause hepatotoxicity. At high doses (400 mg/kg body mass daily), dimethylacetamide causes effects on the central nervous system (e.g. depression, hallucinations and delusion).

Dimethylacetamide may be incompatible with polycarbonate or ABS. Devices (e.g. syringes) that contain polycarbonate or ABS can dissolve when coming into contact with dimethylacetamide.

== Regulation ==
In 2011, dimethylacetamide was identified in the EU as a Substance of very high concern (SVHC) because of its reproductive toxicity. In 2014, the European Commission has started an investigation to restrict the use of dimethylacetamide in the EU according to REACH.

In 2015, the CNESST (Committee on Standards, Equity, Health and Safety at Work in Quebec) has adopted a tightened classification of dimethylacetamide:

| Description | Category | GHS hazard statement |
|---|---|---|
| Reproductive toxicity | 2 | Suspected of damaging fertility or the unborn child (H361) |
| Specific target organ toxicity – repeated exposure | 2 | May cause damage to organs through prolonged or repeated exposure (H373) |
| Serious eye damage/eye irritation | 2 | Causes serious eye irritation (H319) |
| Acute toxicity – inhalation | 3 | Toxic if inhaled (H331) |
| Specific target organ toxicity – single exposure – narcotic effects | 3 | May cause drowsiness or dizziness (H336) |
| Flammable liquid | 4 | Combustible liquid (H227) |

== See also ==
- N-Methylacetamide
- Dimethylformamide
