= Creatine transporter defect =

Creatine transporter deficiency
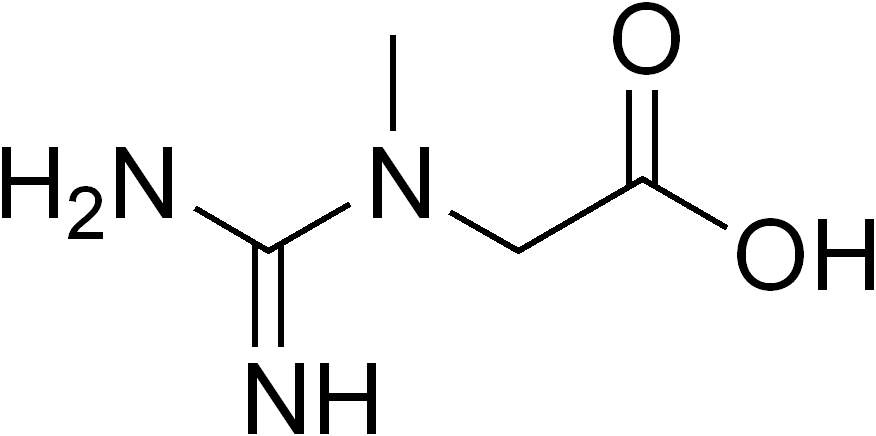
- Specialty: Medical genetics
- Symptoms: Intellectual disability, global developmental delay, speech delay, seizures, behavior disorders, movement disorders
- Causes: Mutation in creatine transporter gene
- Diagnostic method: Genetic testing, magnetic resonance spectroscopy, blood and urine testing

Creatine transporter deficiency (CTD) is an inborn error of creatine metabolism in which creatine is not properly transported to the brain and muscles due to defective creatine transporters. CTD is an X-linked disorder caused by mutation in SLC6A8. SLC6A8 is located at Xq28. Hemizygous males with CTD express speech and behavior abnormalities, intellectual disabilities, development delay, seizures, and autistic behavior. Heterozygous females with CTD generally express fewer, less severe symptoms. CTD is one of three different types of cerebral creatine deficiency (CCD). The other two types of CCD are guanidinoacetate methyltransferase (GAMT) deficiency and L-arginine:glycine amidinotransferase (AGAT) deficiency. Clinical presentation of CTD is similar to that of GAMT and AGAT deficiency. CTD was first identified in 2001 with the presence of a hemizygous nonsense change in SLC6A8 in a male patient.

== Signs and symptoms ==
Generally, the majority of individuals with creatine transporter defect express the following symptoms with varying levels of severity: developmental delay and regression, intellectual disability, and abnormalities in expressive and cognitive speech. However, several studies have shown a wider variety of symptoms including, but not limited to attention deficit and hyperactivity with impulsivity, myopathy, hypotonia, semantic-pragmatic language disorder, oral dyspraxia, extrapyramidal movement disorder, constipation, absent speech development, seizures, and epilepsy. Furthermore, symptoms can significantly vary between hemizygous males and heterozygous females, although, symptoms are generally more severe in hemizygous males. Hemizygous males more commonly express seizures, growth deficiency, severe intellectual disability, and severe expressive language impairment. Heterozygous females more commonly express mild intellectual disability, impairments to confrontational naming and verbal memory, and learning and behavior problems.

== Genetics ==
CTD is caused by pathogenic variants in SLC6A8, located at Xq28. Over 60 variants in SLC6A8 have been reported. SLC6A8 contains 13 exons and spreads across 8.5 kb of genomic DNA (gDNA). The presence of hemizygous variants in males and heterozygous variants in females in SLC6A8 provides evidence that CTD is inherited in an X-linked recessive manner. This usually results in hemizygous males having severe symptoms, while heterozygous female carriers tend to have less severe and more varying symptoms.

== Mechanism ==
The creatine phosphate system is needed for the storage and transmission of phosphate-bound energy in the brain and muscle. The brain and muscle have particularly high metabolic demands, therefore, making creatine a necessary molecule in ATP homeostasis. In regard to the brain, in order for creatine to reach the brain, it must first pass through the blood–brain barrier (BBB). The BBB separates blood from brain interstitial fluid and is, therefore, able to regulate the transfer of nutrients to the brain from the blood. In order to pass through the BBB, creatine utilizes creatine transporter (CRT). When present at the BBB, CRT mediates the passage of creatine from the blood to the brain. When being transported from the blood to the brain, creatine has to constantly move against the creatine concentration gradient that is present at the border between the brain and circulating blood.

== Diagnosis ==
The diagnosis of CTD is usually suspected based on the clinical presentation of intellectual disability, abnormalities in cognitive and expressive speech, and developmental delay. Furthermore, a family history of X-linked intellectual disability, developmental coordination disorder, and seizures is strongly suggestive. Initial screening of CTD involves obtaining a urine sample and measuring the ratio of creatine to creatinine. If the ratio of creatine to creatinine is greater than 1.5, then the presence of CTD is highly likely. This is because a large ratio indicates a high amount of creatine in the urine. This, in turn, indicates inadequate transport of creatine into the brain and muscle. However, the urine screening test often fails in diagnosing heterozygous females. Studies have demonstrated that as a group heterozygous females have significantly decreased cerebral creatine concentration, but that individual heterozygous females often have normal creatine concentrations found in their urine. Therefore, urine screening tests are unreliable as a standard test for diagnosing CTD, particularly in females.

A more reliable and sophisticated manner of testing for cerebral creatine concentrations is through in vivo proton magnetic resonance spectroscopy (1H MRS). In vivo 1H MRS uses proton signals to determine the concentration of specific metabolites. This method of testing is more reliable because it provides a fairly accurate measurement of the amount of creatine inside the brain. Similar to urine testing, a drawback of using 1H MRS as a test for CTD is that the results of the test could be attributed to any of the cerebral creatine deficiencies. The most accurate and reliable method of testing for CTD is through DNA sequence analysis of SLC6A8. DNA analysis of SLC6A8 allows the identification of the location and type of variant causing the cerebral creatine deficiency. Furthermore, DNA analysis of SLC6A8 is able to prove that a cerebral creatine deficiency is due to CTD and not GAMT or AGAT deficiency.

== Treatment ==
CTD is difficult to treat because the transporter responsible for transporting creatine to the brain and muscles is defective. Affected individuals have sufficient amounts of creatine, but it cannot get to the tissues where it is needed. Studies in which oral creatine monohydrate supplements were given to patients with CTD found that patients did not respond to treatment. Patients with CTD are unresponsive to oral creatine monohydrate supplements because regardless of the amount of creatine they ingest, the creatine transporter is still defective, and therefore creatine is incapable of being transported across the BBB. Therapeutic approaches that are currently in development include dodecyl creatine ester (DCE) for intranasal creatine delivery, pharmacochaperones to aid in rescuing misfolded transporter, and gene therapy to compensate for the mutated SLC6A8 gene.

== See also ==
- Dodecyl creatine ester
