= Cerebral creatine deficiency =

- Other names: CCD
- Specialty: Pediatrics, medical genetics, neurology
- Symptoms: intellectual disability, developmental delay, seizures
- Usual onset: early childhood
- Causes: Genetic
- Diagnostic method: Blood and urine tests, genetic testing, brain MRS
- Treatment: dietary modification, creatine supplementation
- Prognosis: variable; early treatment for AGAT and GAMT deficiency results in significantly improved outcomes

Cerebral creatine deficiencies (CCDs) are a small group of inherited disorders that result from defects in creatine biosynthesis and transport. Commonly affected tissues include the brain and muscles. There are three distinct CCDs. The most common is creatine transporter deficiency (CTD), an X-linked disorder caused by pathogenic variants in creatine transporter SLC6A8. The main symptoms of CTD are intellectual disability and developmental delay, and these are caused by a lack of creatine in the brain, due to the defective transporter. There are also two enzymatic defects of creatine biosynthesis, arginine:glycine amidinotransferase deficiency (AGAT deficiency), caused by variants in GATM gene and guanidinoacetate methyltransferase deficiency (GAMT deficiency), caused by variants in GAMT gene. The two single enzyme defects are both inherited in an autosomal recessive manner.

Creatine is synthesized predominantly in the kidney and liver, by a two-step enzymatic process. In the first step, glycine and arginine are combined by arginine:glycine amidinotransferase (AGAT) to form guanidinoacetate. This step also results in the production of ornithine. Creatine is produced by the enzyme guanidinoacetate methyltransferase (GAMT). After production in the liver and kidneys, creatine is transported to organs and tissues with high energy demands, most commonly the brain and skeletal muscles. In addition to endogenous production, creatine can be obtained from dietary sources or supplementation. Ornithine aminotransferase deficiency can cause secondary creatine deficiency; however, it does not result in cerebral creatine deficiency.

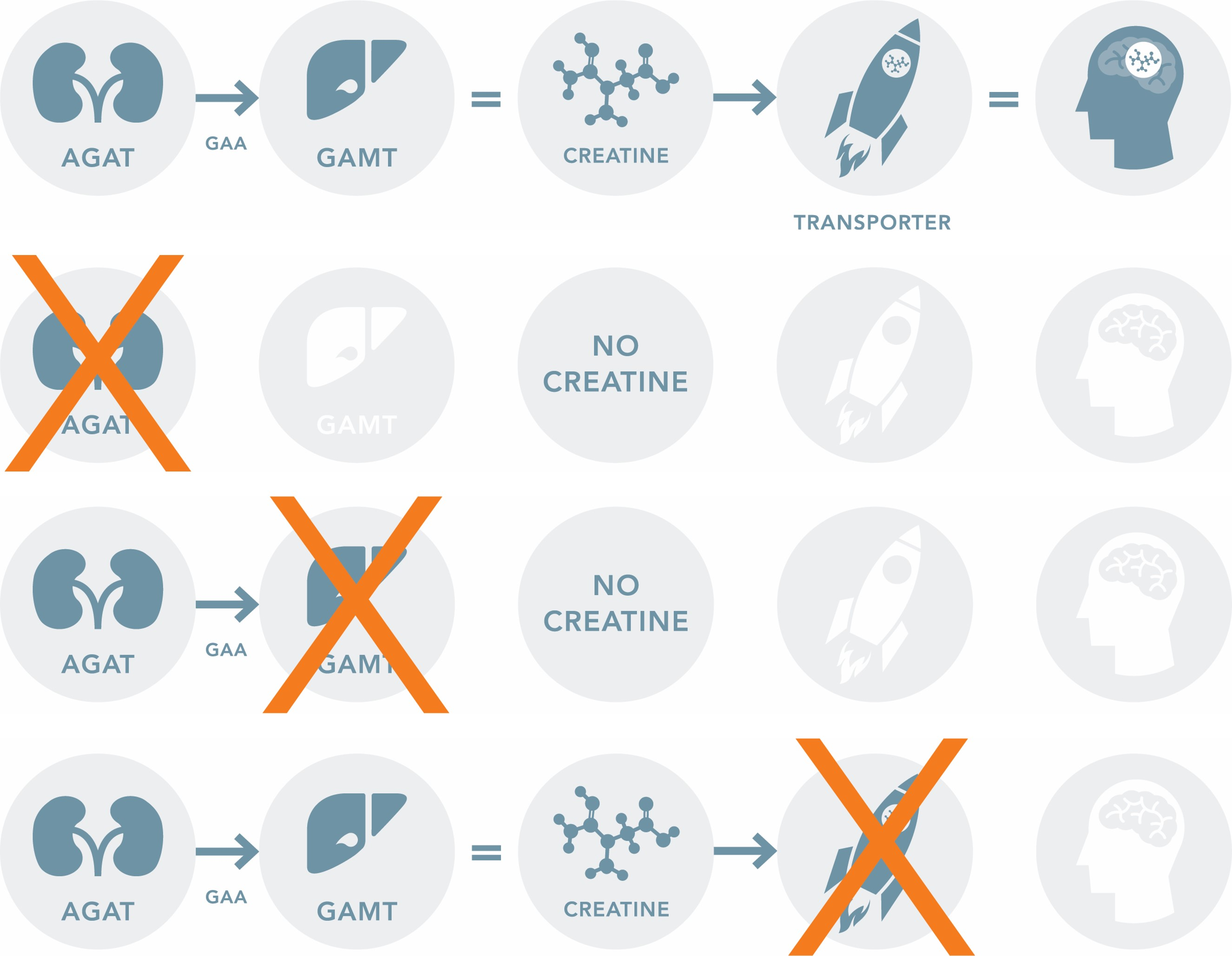
Depiction of normal creatine production pathway (top), creatine production in AGAT deficiency, creatine production in GAMT deficiency, creatine production in creatine transporter deficiency (bottom)

== Signs and symptoms ==
The clinical findings in all three CCDs result from the consequences of decreased levels of creatine in tissues where it is required. In affected individuals with any of the three disorders, there is an almost complete absence of creatine and phosphocreatine in the brain. The two tissues with the highest demands for creatine are the brain and skeletal muscles. Muscular findings usually include weakness and decreased endurance. Other clinical findings include seizures, intellectual disability and developmental delay. Most affected individuals appear normal at birth, with clinical findings becoming apparent during the first year of life, and progressing.

== Pathogenesis ==
Creatine is synthesized primarily in the liver and kidneys via a two-step enzymatic process, with AGAT and GAMT enzymes. Defects in either of these two enzymes can cause a CCD. In order to pass the blood brain barrier, creatine requires a specialized transporter, encoded for by SLC6A8. A defect in this transporter is responsible for the third CCD.

== Diagnosis ==
Initially diagnosis is typically established by creatine, creatinine, and guanidinoacetate measurement in the plasma, urine, and/or cerebrospinal fluid, as listed in the table below. The levels of these biochemical markers can indicate which specific creatine disorder is present. Brain magnetic resonance spectroscopy can also be used in diagnosis, but will show decreased creatine levels in all three disorders and is therefore unable to identify the specific creatine deficiency disorder. Definitive diagnosis can be found through DNA sequencing of the relevant gene and enzymatic activity (for GAMT and AGAT) or transport activity (CTD).

Characteristic metabolite patterns for creatine deficiency disorders
Condition	Plasma GAA	Plasma Cr	Urine GAA/Creatinine	Urine Cr/Creatinine	CSF GAA	CSF Cr
AGAT	Low	Low	Low	Normal	Low*	Low
GAMT	Elevated	Low	Elevated	Normal	Elevated	Low
CTD	Normal	Normal	Normal	Elevated*	Normal*	Normal*

*Inconsistent data (variable urinary creatine/creatinine in females with CTD)

== Treatment ==
Treatment for AGAT and GAMT mainly consists of creatine supplementation. GAMT treatment may also include ornithine and sodium benzoate supplementation and/or diet restrictions in arginine and/or protein. These have shown to be effective, especially when started early in life.

There is no current effective treatment for CTD. Creatine supplementation can have some benefit but because creatine does not easily pass the blood-brain barrier without a functioning transporter, neurological symptoms remain significant.
