= Dodecyl creatine ester =

Clinical data
- Other names: DCE; CBT101; CBT-101
- Drug class: Centrally permeable creatine prodrug

Identifiers
- IUPAC name: dodecyl 2-[carbamimidoyl(methyl)amino]acetate
- CAS Number: 1442645-21-7
- PubChem CID: 71734864
- DrugBank: DB18049
- ChemSpider: 30815144
- UNII: Z7DW5UW9UD
- ChEMBL: ChEMBL2398530

Chemical and physical data
- Formula: C_{16}H_{33}N_{3}O_{2}
- Molar mass: 299.459 g·mol^{−1}
- 3D model (JSmol): Interactive image
- SMILES: CCCCCCCCCCCCOC(=O)CN(C)C(=N)N
- InChI: InChI=1S/C16H33N3O2/c1-3-4-5-6-7-8-9-10-11-12-13-21-15(20)14-19(2)16(17)18/h3-14H2,1-2H3,(H3,17,18); Key:AEKJLAYKIYFBGU-UHFFFAOYSA-N

Dodecyl creatine ester (DCE; developmental code name CBT101) is a lipophilic creatine ester and prodrug which is under development for the treatment of creatine transporter deficiency (CTD). It is more centrally permeable than creatine itself due to its much greater lipophilicity, and is also formulated for use via intranasal administration, which may further enhance brain permeation via the nose-to-brain pathway. As a result, DCE may be able to bypass the non-functional creatine transporter in CTD. Accordingly, unlike creatine, DCE has been found to increase brain creatine levels and improve symptoms such as cognitive impairment in rodents with CTD. The drug has also been found to increase dopamine levels and improve motor symptoms in the 6-hydroxydopamine (6-OHDA) model of parkinsonism in rodents. DCE was first described in the scientific literature by 2013. As of 2026, it is in phase 1 clinical trials, with the results of a phase 1 trial having been published in October 2026.

== See also ==
- Creatine
- Creatine methyl ester
