= Creatine methyl ester =

Names
- IUPAC name Methyl N-(aminoiminomethyl)-N-methylglycine

Identifiers
CAS Number	341553-87-5; 132478-02-5 (HCl)
3D model (JSmol)	Interactive image; Interactive image
ChemSpider	9861656
PubChem CID	11686929
UNII	UM5VUD5KNZ
CompTox Dashboard (EPA)	DTXSID40470581
- InChI: InChI=1S/C5H11N3O2/c1-8(5(6)7)3-4(9)10-2/h3H2,1-2H3,(H3,6,7) Key: JQIVVNGNZVUVJC-UHFFFAOYSA-N; InChI=1/C5H11N3O2/c1-8(5(6)7)3-4(9)10-2/h3H2,1-2H3,(H3,6,7) Key: JQIVVNGNZVUVJC-UHFFFAOYAK
- SMILES: NC(N(C)CC(OC)=O)=N; O=C(OC)CN(C(=[N@H])N)C

Properties
Chemical formula	C_{5}H_{11}N_{3}O_{2}
Molar mass	145.162 g·mol^{−1}
- Except where otherwise noted, data are given for materials in their standard state (at 25 °C [77 °F], 100 kPa). verify (what is ?) Infobox references

Creatine methyl ester is the methyl ester derivative of the amino acid creatine. It can be prepared by the esterification of creatine with methanol.

By undergoing an esterification process with methanol, this compound seeks to enhance creatine's absorption rate in the body. Creatine esters, like creatine methyl ester, have been studied for their potential to improve bioavailability when compared to standard creatine monohydrate.

== See also ==
- Creatine
- Dodecyl creatine ester
