= Guanidinoacetate N-methyltransferase =

Class of enzymes

GAMT
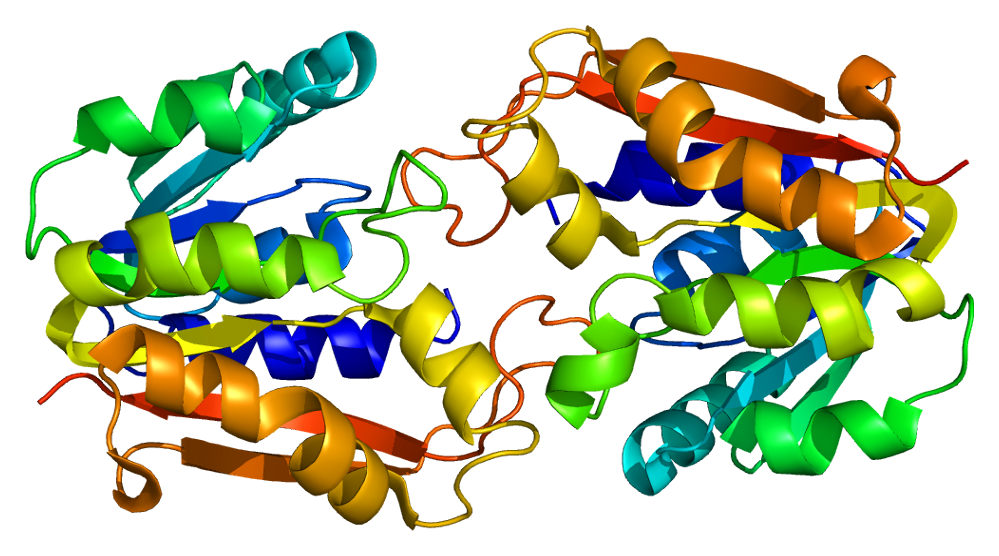

Identifiers
- Aliases: GAMT, CCDS2, HEL-S-20, PIG2, TP53I2, guanidinoacetate N-methyltransferase
- External IDs: OMIM: 601240; MGI: 1098221; GeneCards: GAMT
Available structures
PDB	Ortholog search: PDBe RCSB
PDB	List of PDB id codes 3ORH
Enzyme activity
EC #	BRENDA	ExPASy	KEGG	MetaCyc
2.1.1.2	↗	↗	↗	↗

Gene location (Human)
Chr.	Chromosome 19 (human)
Band	19p13.3	Start	1,397,026 bp
Band	19p13.3	End	1,401,570 bp

Gene location (Mouse)
Chr.	Chromosome 10 (mouse)
Band	10 C1|10 39.72 cM	Start	80,093,985 bp
Band	10 C1|10 39.72 cM	End	80,096,846 bp
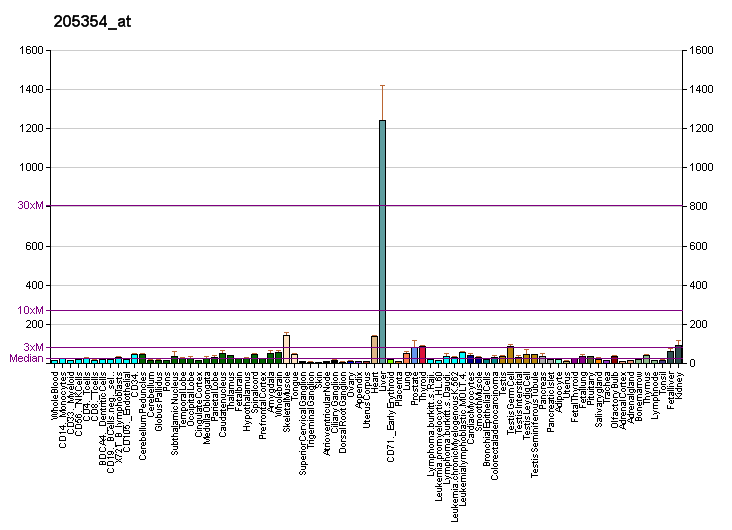
RNA expression pattern
Bgee	Human / Mouse (ortholog); Top expressed in: muscle of thigh; right lobe of liver; gastrocnemius muscle; Skeletal muscle tissue of rectus abdominis; triceps brachii muscle; vastus lateralis muscle; glutes; thoracic diaphragm; biceps brachii; Skeletal muscle tissue of biceps brachii / Top expressed in: left lobe of liver; adrenal gland; yolk sac; gallbladder; right kidney; muscle of thigh; esophagus; triceps brachii muscle; proximal tubule; temporal muscle; More reference expression data
BioGPS	More reference expression data
Gene ontology
Molecular function	methyltransferase activity; transferase activity; guanidinoacetate N-methyltransferase activity; S-adenosylmethionine-dependent methyltransferase activity
Cellular component	cytoplasm; cytosol; nucleus
Biological process	muscle contraction; regulation of multicellular organism growth; methylation; spermatogenesis; animal organ morphogenesis; creatine metabolic process; creatine biosynthetic process; S-adenosylhomocysteine metabolic process; S-adenosylmethionine metabolic process
Sources:Amigo / QuickGO
Orthologs
Databases	NCBI: entry; OMA: entry
Species	Human	Mouse
Entrez	2593	14431
Ensembl	ENSG00000130005	ENSMUSG00000020150
UniProt	Q14353	O35969
RefSeq (mRNA)	NM_138924; NM_000156	NM_010255; NM_001347119
RefSeq (protein)	NP_000147; NP_620279	NP_001334048; NP_034385
Location (UCSC)	Chr 19: 1.4 – 1.4 Mb	Chr 10: 80.09 – 80.1 Mb
PubMed search
- Wikidata
View/Edit Human	View/Edit Mouse

guanidinoacetate N-methyltransferase

Identifiers
- EC no.: 2.1.1.2
- CAS no.: 9029-75-8

Databases
- BRENDA: enzyme data
- ExPASy: NiceZyme view
- KEGG: enzyme entry
- MetaCyc: metabolic pathway
- Rhea: reactions
- PDB structures: RCSB PDB PDBe PDBsum
- Gene Ontology: AmiGO / QuickGO
Search
- PMC: articles
- PubMed: articles
- NCBI: proteins

Guanidinoacetate N-methyltransferase (EC 2.1.1.2) is an enzyme that is encoded by gene GAMT located on chromosome 19p13.3 and catalyzes the chemical reaction:

glycocyamine
+ SAM
creatine
+ SAH

This is a methylation reaction in which glycocyamine is converted to creatine. The methyl group comes from the cofactor, S-adenosyl methionine (SAM), which loses its methyl group and becomes S-adenosyl-L-homocysteine (SAH).

This enzyme belongs to the family of transferases, specifically those transferring one-carbon group methyltransferases. The systematic name of this enzyme class is S-adenosyl-L-methionine:N-guanidinoacetate methyltransferase. Other names in common use include GA methylpherase, guanidinoacetate methyltransferase, guanidinoacetate transmethylase, methionine-guanidinoacetic transmethylase, and guanidoacetate methyltransferase. It participates in the metabolism of amino acids.

Defects in the gene which encodes this protein have been implicated in neurologic syndromes and muscular hypotonia, probably due to creatine deficiency and accumulation of guanidinoacetate in the brain of affected individuals. Two transcript variants encoding different isoforms have been described for this gene.

== Structural studies ==
As of late 2007, 7 structures have been solved for this class of enzymes, with PDB accession codes PDB: 1KHH, PDB: 1P1B, PDB: 1P1C, PDB: 1XCJ, PDB: 1XCL, PDB: 1ZX0, and PDB: 2BLN.

== See also ==
- Guanidinoacetate methyltransferase deficiency
