= Nose-to-brain drug delivery mechanism =

Drug delivery via inhalation

Intranasal drug delivery occurs when particles are inhaled into the nasal cavity and transported directly into the nervous system. Though pharmaceuticals can be injected into the nose, some concerns include injuries, infection, and safe disposal. Studies demonstrate improved patient compliance with inhalation. Treating brain diseases has been a challenge due to the blood brain barrier. Previous studies evaluated the efficacy of delivery therapeutics through intranasal route for brain diseases and mental health conditions. Intranasal administration is a potential route associated with high drug transfer from nose to brain and drug bioavailability.

== History of drug delivery ==
Drug delivery is a process of administering therapeutics to treat human diseases. The first drug delivery system is often dated to the 1950s, when Smith Kline & French Laboratories introduced the Spansule technology. Between 1950s and 1980s, there were four drug release systems developed for oral and transdermal applications: dissolution, diffusion, osmosis, and ion-exchange controlled release. Later in the 1980s, the Lupron Depot technology further advanced the field by offering zero-order and long-term release systems. The intranasal route gained interest towards the end of the 20th century with treating cardiovascular and respiratory diseases. During the late 1980s, William Frey II studied the intranasal route for treating brain diseases. Ever since, it has become a potential route for nose-to-brain delivery. Intranasal administration has classically been associated with drugs of abuse such as cocaine and ketamine and is often associated with characteristic forms of tissue damage and resulting medical complications, which has discouraged adoption of intranasal formulations of medically used drugs, however it has increasingly become viewed as a convenient and rapidly acting route of administration both for drugs where the site of action is in the nasal passages such as decongestants, and for other drugs where rapid action is desired but intravenous administration is inconvenient or undesirable, such as in procedural sedation and analgesia for children in emergency care, and treatment of opioid overdose.

== Anatomy ==
=== Intranasal delivery pathway ===
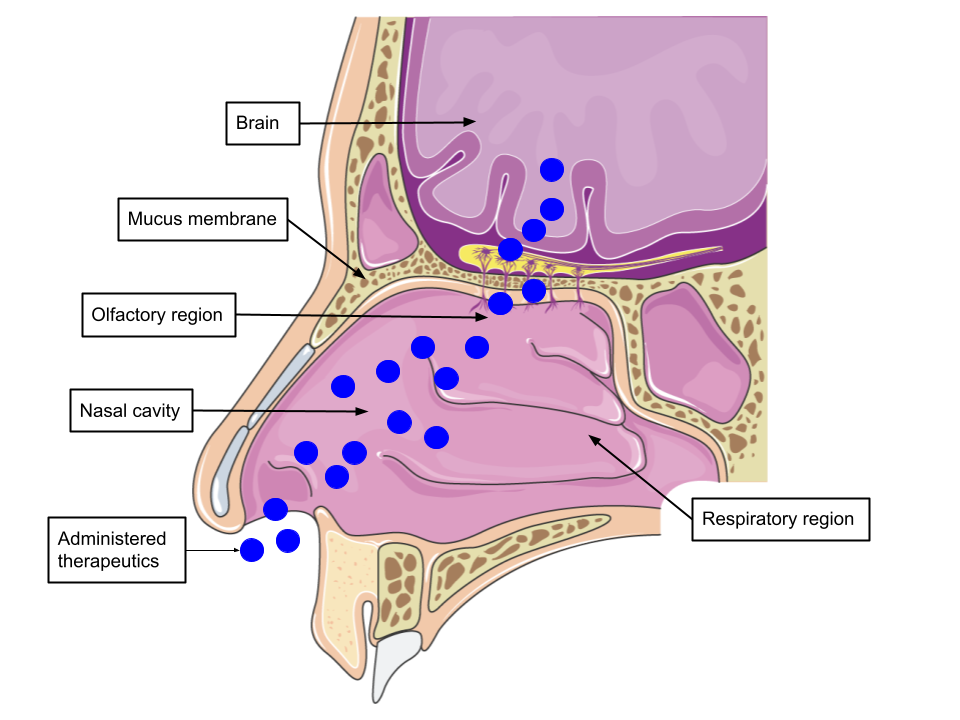
Pathway of inhaled particles from nose to brain.

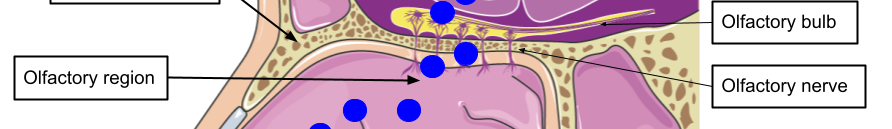
The olfactory region contains the olfactory nerve and bulb. Olfactory nerve is a network of fibers which connect to the olfactory bulb. When particles reach the bulb, they have access to different regions of the brain.

The nasal cavity is highly vascularized, allowing efficient transfer of molecules directly to the nervous system. Compared to other administration routes, nasal drug delivery increases bioavailability and reduces systemic exposure risks. The nasal cavity's slightly acidic environment and enzymes can affect drug degradation, making delivery systems with neutral to acidic pH ideal. The respiratory region, with its large surface area and high vascularization, is the primary site for drug absorption into systemic circulation. Targeting the olfactory region enhances nose-to-brain drug delivery, as particles can travel via the olfactory nerve to the brain. This route offers potential for treating brain diseases and mental health conditions.

=== Blood brain barrier ===
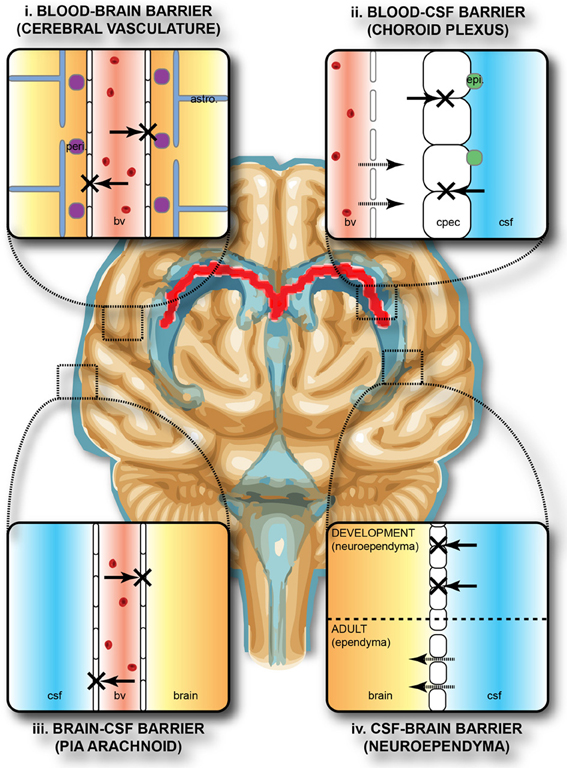
Depiction of all the different barriers in the brain. Focusing on (i), the blood brain barrier (BBB) is a highly selective membrane. It only allows passage of specific particles based on physiochemical properties.

The blood-brain barrier (BBB) is a semipermeable membrane that separates the blood from the brain's interstitial fluid. It is formed by tight junctions between endothelial cells, astrocytes, and pericytes in the brain's capillaries, and has high electrical resistance. The BBB is crucial for protecting the brain from pathogens and toxic substances, maintaining homeostasis, and preventing alterations to neuronal functions. However, some diseases can damage the BBB, causing leakage. Research suggests that increasing intake of vitamins and antioxidants, as well as reducing stress, can help restore the BBB. Due to its selective nature, the BBB restricts the passive diffusion of solutes, large and hydrophilic molecules, and immune factors, making it challenging to deliver pharmaceuticals directly to the brain.

== Recent studies on nose-to-brain drug delivery ==
=== Alzheimer's ===
Neurodegenerative diseases occur from loss of neuronal structure and function. This progressive degeneration of neurons is irreversible. Alzheimer's is a neurodegenerative disease that begins with short-term memory loss progressing to loss of control over heartbeat and breathing. It has been over 100 years since Alois Alzheimer first presented the world disease to the world in 1906. There is evidence for the efficacy of intranasal delivery to treat Alzheimer's. Intranasal delivery of insulin showed greater memory improvement in patients with Alzheimer's than in healthy individuals. Increased microglial activation inflammation are characteristics of Alzheimer's. Animal studies show intranasal administration of pro-resolving lipid mediators decreased both factors, slowing pathogenesis of this disease. Delivering a novel peptide via intranasal route reduced amyloid beta plaques, a defining trait of Alzheimer's and enhanced cognitive functions. Intranasal delivery of anti-Alzheimer's drug dispersed through hydrogel in rabbits demonstrated higher bioavailability compared to oral tablets. MiR132 is an RNA molecule that regulates neuronal morphology and maintains survival. This molecule is downregulated with Alzheimer's. A study administered PEG-PLA nanoparticles loaded with this miRNA to mice through the nasal route. This novel therapy showed increased expression of miR132 and improved memory function. To strengthen the effectiveness of intranasal delivery, there are studies to develop permeation enhancers to better improve drug transport across the blood brain barrier.

=== Glioblastoma ===
Abnormal cell growth and formation of mass in the brain tissue or nearby regions may cause brain cancer. Constant headaches, seizures, and blurred vision are common symptoms. Glioblastoma (GBM) is the most fast-growing and deadliest brain tumor. Though the main cause of glioblastoma remains unknown, it originates when astrocytes mutate and multiply uncontrollably forming tumors in the frontal and temporal lobes of the brain. The challenge with current therapeutics is to initiate tumor cell apoptosis with no toxic effects to healthy brain tissue. Nanoparticles loaded with chemotherapeutics delivered through the intranasal route show promising results in treating glioblastoma. PLGA-based nanoparticles loaded with paclitaxel or doxorubicin conjugated with a RGD sequence targeted the glioblastoma microenvironment and reduced tumor volume through cell death. MicroRNA-21 (miR-21) inhibits pro-apoptotic genes increasing progression of glioblastoma. Self-assembling nanoparticles produced with anti-tumor peptides were administered intranasally and reduced miR-21 levels increasing tumor cell apoptosis.

=== Epilepsy ===
Infection, head injury, or strokes can cause sudden bursts of neuronal activity leading to abnormal behaviors, muscle movement, and mood changes. This condition is known as seizure. Epilepsy is characterized by recurring seizures. Some possible causes of epilepsy include imbalance or disruption of neurotransmitters, strokes, or brain injury. Intranasal delivery of carbamazepine nanoparticles increase antiepileptic drug bioavailability. Administering a self-assembling hydrogel with neuroactive drugs to treat Parkinson's disease appears to be biocompatible, low in toxicity, and have a good recovery capacity. Nasal delivery of this gel demonstrated increased drug concentration in the brain. Oxytocin is a hormone which is observed to alleviate anxiety symptoms in people with autism. Intranasal administration indicated efficient transfer of pharmacologically active oxytocin from nasal cavity to brain.

=== Parkinson's ===
Similar to Alzheimer's, Parkinson's is the most common neurodegenerative disease associated with balance and coordination issues, muscle stiffness, and tremors. During the early 1800s, James Parkinson medically defined this disease. A study observed improvement in locomotor abilities in rats with Parkinson's after intranasal delivery of conjugated mitochondrial systems. Another study demonstrated delivery of neuroactive drugs in a hydrogel increased residence times in the nasal cavity and concentration in the brain. Administering therapeutics combined with nanocarriers is shown to directly transfer drugs to the target cells and enhance accumulation. The observed effects include improved neuronal signaling and locomotion. Furthermore, intranasal delivery of biodegradable nanoparticles surface-modified with lactoferrin increase accumulation in the brain and cellular uptake.

=== Depression ===
Characterized by loss of neuroplasticity, depression is a common mood disorder causing persistent negative emotions and changes in lifestyle. Intranasal delivery of relaxin-3 mimetics demonstrated significant anti-depressant activity in behavior paradigms of rat models. Delivering a thermoresponsive hydrogel loaded with berberine intranasally exhibited high bioavailability in hippocampus and anti-depressant activity.

=== Anxiety ===
Anxiety can impair hippocampus function which increases risk of depression and dementia. Anxiolytic effects were observed in animal models post-intranasal delivery of a loaded polymeric nanoparticles. Another study indicated intranasal delivery of neuropeptide Y lowered anxiety in rats.

=== Anorexia nervosa ===
Anorexia nervosa (AN) is a common eating disorder characterized by low intake of food from fear of weight gain. Several complications are associated with this chronic disorder such as fatigue, insomnia, and low blood pressure. Intranasal administration of oxytocin in patients with AN significantly lowered food anticipation and eating concern.

=== Substance use disorder ===
Uncontrolled and continuous use of a substance, drugs or alcohol, is known as substance use disorder. Substances can interfere with neuronal signaling and potentially disrupt the brain circuit. Addiction to these substances impairs thinking, behavior, and other biological functions. Intranasal delivery of insulin is associated with improvement in brain metabolic activities and alleviate impulsivity. Opioid addiction is prevalent and associated with many substance abuse deaths. A study observed high biodistribution in the brain and reduction in opioid overdose in rats administered with naloxone-loaded lipid nanoparticles.

=== Post-traumatic stress disorder ===
Witnessing a devastating or terrifying situation can lead to post-traumatic stress disorder (PTSD). This mental health condition triggers anxiety, depression, and extreme fear with memories. Intranasal administration of temperature-sensitive hydrogels loaded with PTSD medications showed enhanced brain targeting effects and tissue distribution. Similarly, another study observed anti-PTSD effects with intranasal administration of loaded hydrogels.

=== Schizophrenia ===
Schizophrenia is a chronic mental health condition caused by changes in brain chemistry and structure. Genetics and environment are hypothesized to play a key role in development of this disorder. Research suggests impaired gene expression or chemical imbalance may impact this condition. Anxiety can increase risk of schizophrenia and symptoms include hallucinations, disorganized speech, and abnormal behavior. Davunetide (NAP) is a segment of activity-dependent neuroprotective protein (ADNP). ADNP is reported be downregulated with schizophrenia. A study observed decreased hyperactivity in mice when treated with NAP via the intranasal route.

=== Migraine ===
Migraine occurs with episodes of intense headache causing nausea and throbbing pain. Stress and hormonal changes can be a trigger migraine. A nasal spray containing sumatriptan demonstrated a significant reduction of migraine pain. Further clinical studies of intranasal administration of sumatriptan (ST) can help evaluate efficacy and safety of such delivery systems. Since its approval by the FDA in 2021, dihydroergotamine mesylate has been administered through nasal sprays to treat migraines.

== Nanosystems for intranasal drug delivery ==
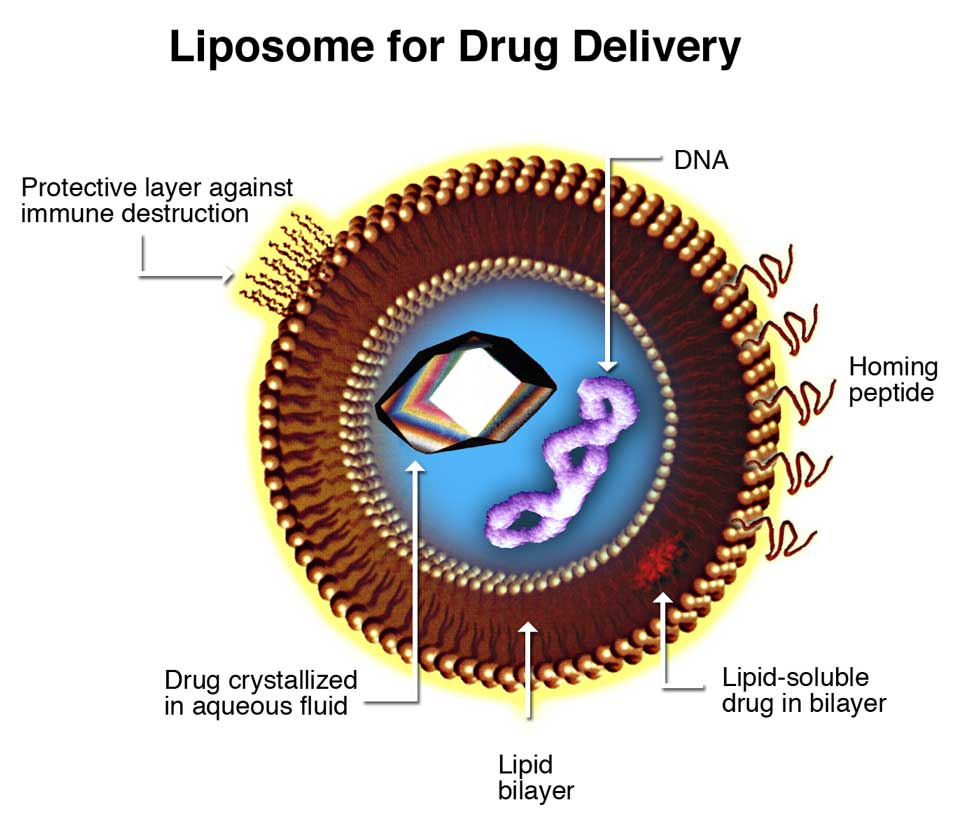
Depiction of a lipid-based nanoparticle, liposome. The phospholipid bilayer exhibits amphipathic properties which allows encapsulation of hydrophilic and hydrophobic molecules.

Nanoparticles are drug delivery systems ranging from 1–1000 nm in diameter. Lipid-based and polymer-based nanocarriers are commonly used for nose-to-brain delivery as they exert high stability, solubility, and adherence. Exosomes and dendrimers are other potential nanocarriers. Nanosystems can be synthesized either using physical or chemical methods. A few physical methods include evaporation-condensation reaction and laser ablation. Irradiation, microemulsion, and chemical reduction are common chemical techniques to develop nanoparticles. Sonication, electroporation, and incubation are common methods to load drugs into nanocarriers.

Coating these nanosystems with mucoadhesive agents, stimulus-sensitive materials, or antibodies can enhance biocompatibility, clearance rates, specificity, and bioavailability. Penetration and absorption enhancers can significantly increase the overall efficacy of the system. Imaging studies along with measurement of drug transfer efficiency and bioavailability can further support the role of these drug delivery systems.

=== Lipid-based nanoparticles ===
Lipid-based nanoparticles (LNP) can deliver molecules with low toxicity and controlled release. Liposomes, solid lipid nanoparticles (SLN), nanostructured lipid carriers (NLC), and nanoemulsions are examples.

Liposomes are made up of phospholipids forming spherical vesicles. This property enables liposomes to exhibit high biocompatibility and biodegradability. Studies report potential application of liposomes to treat brain diseases due to increased retention and absorption in nasal cavity, and high brain biodistribution. A previous study developed a cationic liposome loaded with mRNA and green fluorescent protein (GFP). Intranasal delivery of this formulation in murine models demonstrated high brain biodistribution and expression of mRNA-GFP.

Solid lipid nanoparticles (SLNs) are made up of solid lipids forming a matrix and stabilized by surfactants. They exhibit high physical stability and remain in solid state at different temperatures. Sometimes burst release may occur due to rigidity and less flexibility in shape.

Nanostructured lipid carriers (NLC) are synthesized by a mixture of solid and aqueous lipids. NLC's are developed from SLNs, thus referred to as second generation LNPs. Intranasal administration of NLC loaded with curcumin (CRM) increased biodistribution and concentration in brain after emerging as a potential system for brain cancer.

Small colloidal systems made of micelles containing oil, aqueous phases, and emulsifiers are called nanoemulsions. Intranasal delivery of gel nanoemulsion loaded with temozolomide is observed to exhibit sustained release and better permeation from nose to brain to treat glioblastoma.

=== Polymer-based nanoparticles ===
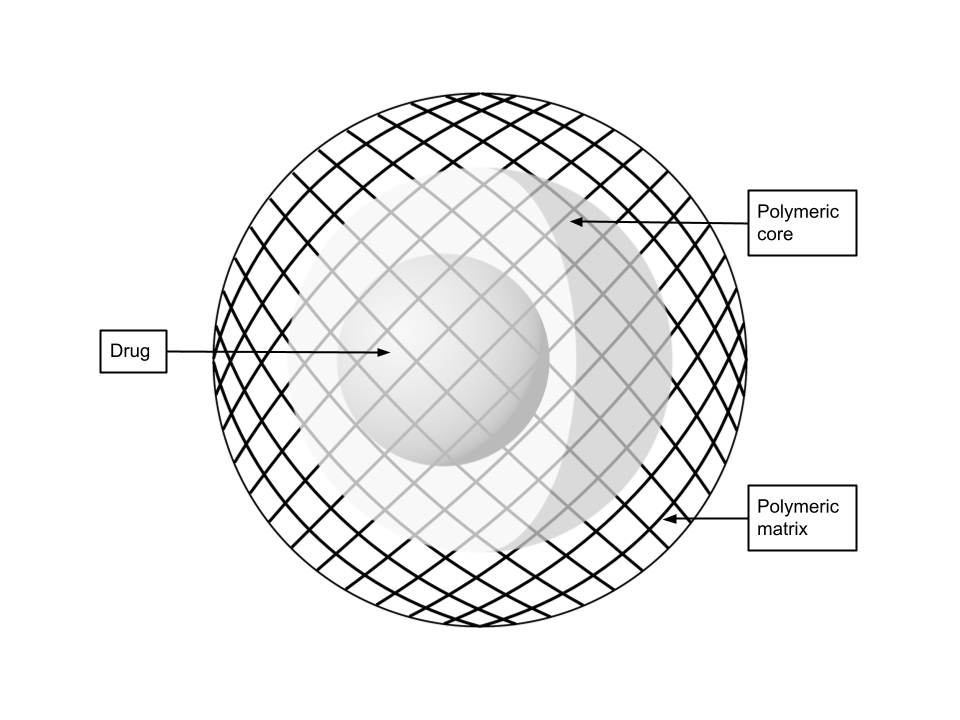
Depiction of a type of polymer-based nanoparticle. Nanospheres contain a uniformly dispersed drug encapsulated in a polymeric core and matrix.

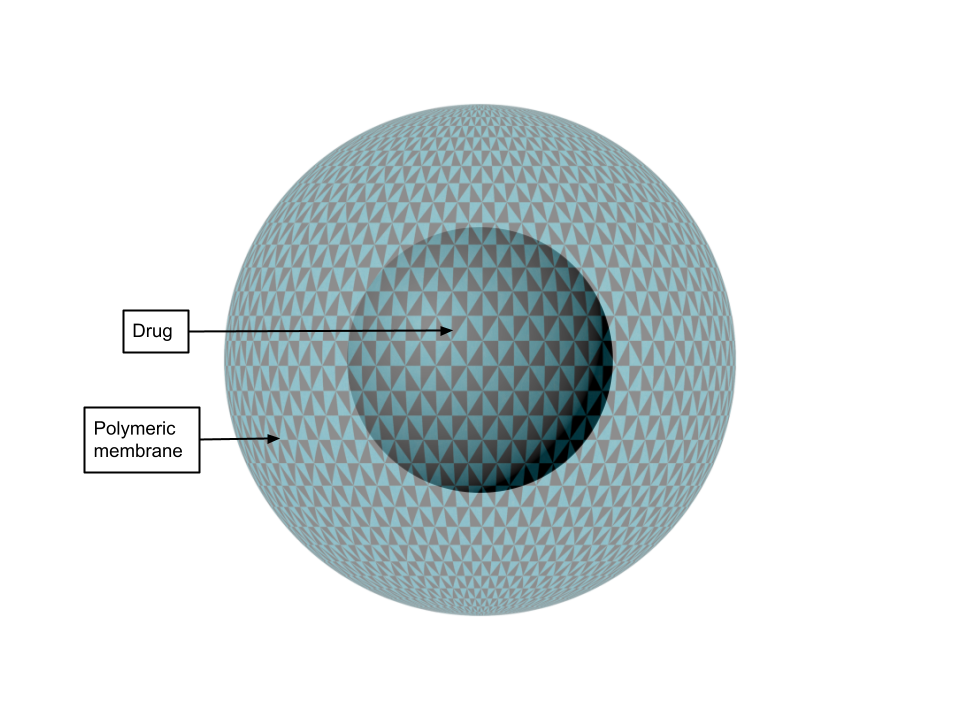
Depiction of a polymer-based nanoparticle. Nanocapsules consist of drugs encapsulated in a polymeric membrane.

Polymer-based nanoparticles can be made from either natural or synthetic sources. Nanospheres and nanocapsules are polymeric nanoparticle systems. Natural polymers can be found in the environment or human body. On the other hand, synthetic polymers do not occur naturally and are artificially developed polymers with chemical modifications. Natural polymer-based nanoparticles can be made up of chitosan, hyaluronic acid, alginate, and gelatin. Natural polymers exhibit excellent biocompatibility and biodegradability, and low toxicity. Synthetic polymer-based nanoparticles can consist of polyglycolic acid (PGA), poly (lactic acid) (PLA), and poly(lactide-co-glycolide) (PLGA).

A study evaluated chitosan nanoparticles loaded with an anti-epileptic drug, phenytoin (PHT), to treat epilepsy. Observations suggested high stability, sustained release, and bioavailability when these particles where administered via the intranasal route. Similarly, administering PLGA nanoparticles loaded lamotrigine (LTG), polymer-based nanoparticle, showed better permeation through BBB and higher bioavailability.

=== Exosomes ===
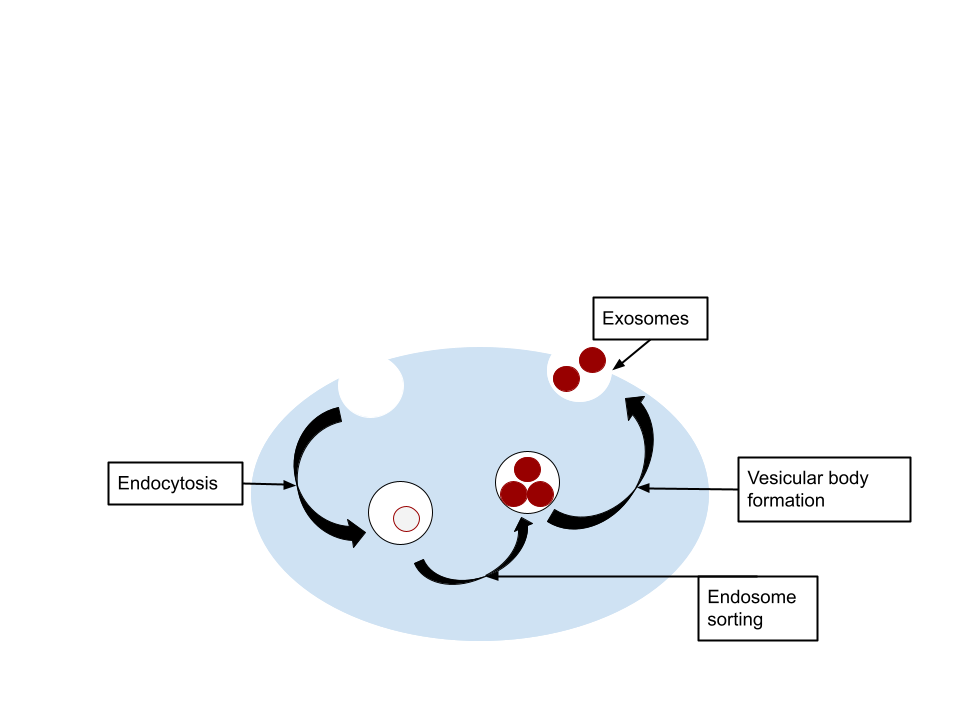
Depiction of exosome formation. Following invagination of the plasma membrane, multivesicular bodies (MVBs) form and fuse with membrane to release exosomes.

Exosomes are vesicular structures containing genetic information. Recently, exosomes are being utilized as drug carriers. These systems are observed to be stable, specific, and safe. Moreover, delivery of exosomes shows less immunogenic affects. Further surface modifications and conjugation with liposomes enhances the therapeutic effects. Based on a previous study, intranasal delivery of exosomes loaded with a Stat3 inhibitor reduced brain inflammation and slowed brain tumor growth.

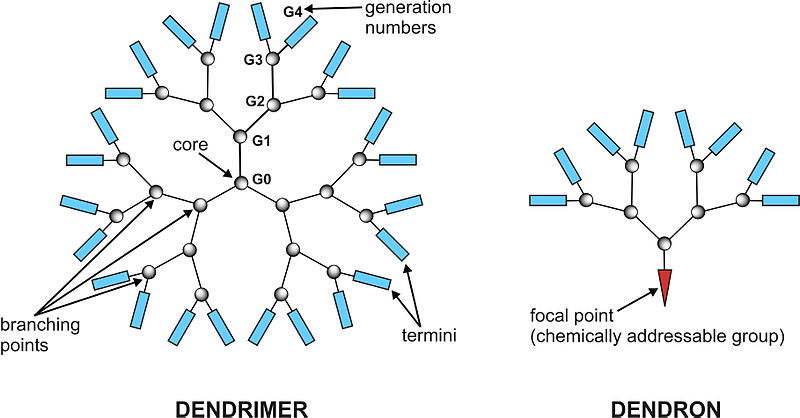
Depiction of a dendrimer. A dendron represents a single unit of a dendrimer.

=== Dendrimers ===
Dendrimers are polymeric macromolecules with a branched network similar to a tree structure. Generally, they are spherical and homogeneous. Surface charge and molecule chemistry can play crucial role with drug interaction and release. Poly(amidoamine) (PAMAM) dendrimers are the most commonly used system. A study investigated potential application of dendrimer-based formulation of haloperidol. Intranasal administration showed improved targeting, and solubility as well as high concentrations in the brain. Drugs can be loaded in dendrimers through formulation and nanoconstruct.

=== Importance of physiochemical properties ===
For drug delivery systems to bypass the blood brain barrier, modifications of physiochemical properties can enhance safety and efficacy. Size, surface charge, and lipophilicity play a major role in substance bypassing the blood brain barrier. Smaller, positively charged, or more lipophilic molecules enhance efficacy of nose-to-brain delivery. Decrease in delivery system size increases permeation. As the membrane is negatively charged, a particle with positive surface charge interacts electrostatically which enhances bioadhesion. Carriers with more lipophilicity exert better mucoadhesion and residence time. Drug system pH, solubility, and hydrogen bonding potential are other physiochemical properties which should be evaluated.
