= GATM (gene) =

Protein-coding gene in the species Homo sapiens

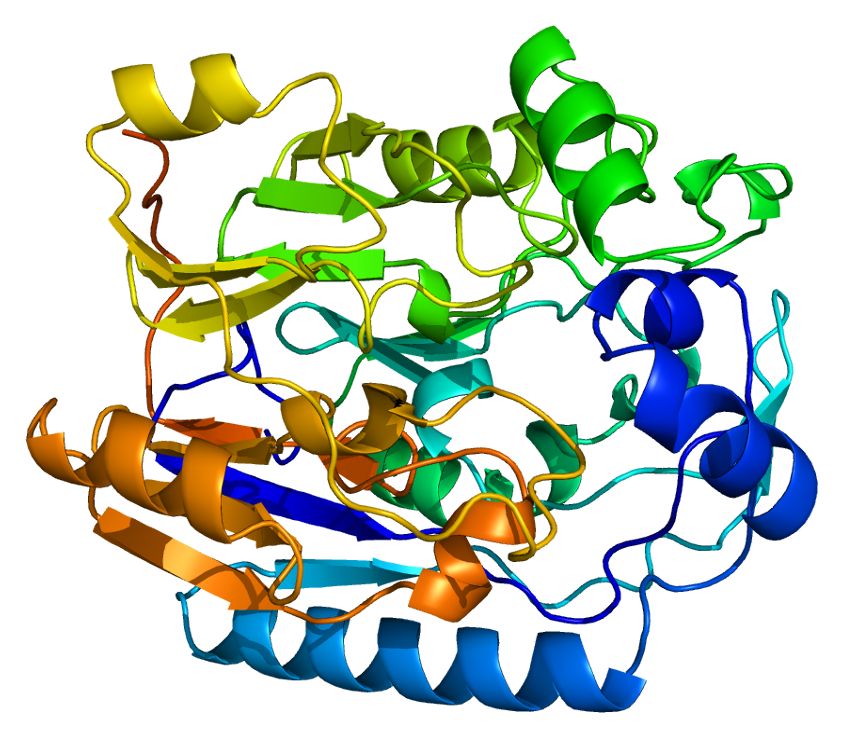
Available structures
| PDB | Ortholog search: PDBe RCSB |
| PDB | List of PDB id codes 1JDW, 1JDX, 2JDW, 2JDX, 3JDW, 4JDW, 5JDW, 6JDW, 7JDW, 8JDW, 9JDW |

Identifiers
- Aliases: GATM, AGAT, AT, CCDS3, glycine amidinotransferase, FRTS1
- External IDs: OMIM: 602360; MGI: 1914342; HomoloGene: 1136; GeneCards: GATM; OMA:GATM - orthologs

Gene location (Human)
| Chr. | Chromosome 15 (human) |
| Band | 15q21.1 | Start | 45,361,124 bp |
| Band | 15q21.1 | End | 45,402,327 bp |

Gene location (Mouse)
| Chr. | Chromosome 2 (mouse) |
| Band | 2 E5|2 60.63 cM | Start | 122,424,948 bp |
| Band | 2 E5|2 60.63 cM | End | 122,441,784 bp |
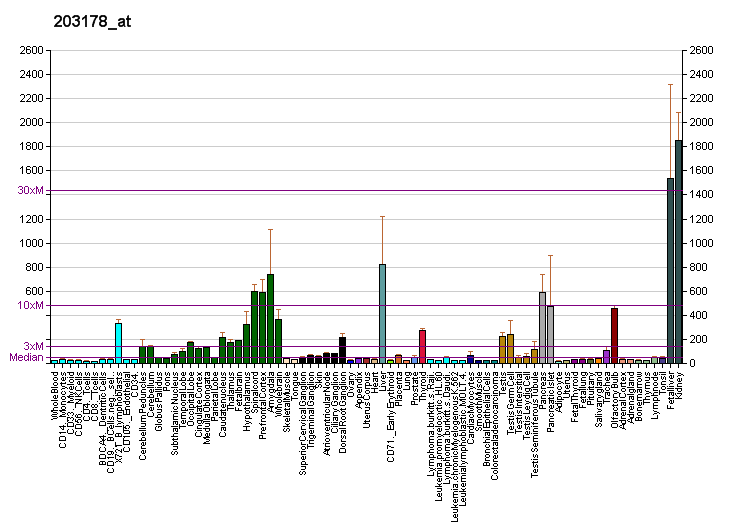

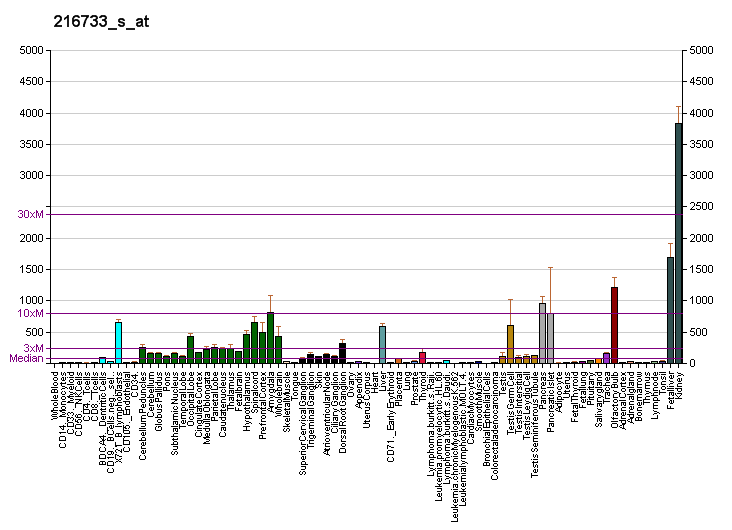
RNA expression pattern
| Bgee | Human / Mouse (ortholog); Top expressed in: body of pancreas; right lobe of liver; jejunal mucosa; corpus callosum; renal medulla; kidney tubule; trigeminal ganglion; olfactory bulb; spinal cord; human kidney / Top expressed in: right kidney; human kidney; thoracic diaphragm; primary visual cortex; striatum of neuraxis; hippocampus proper; pancreas; cerebellar cortex; superior frontal gyrus; olfactory bulb; More reference expression data |
| BioGPS | More reference expression data |
Gene ontology
| Molecular function | transferase activity; glycine amidinotransferase activity; amidinotransferase activity |
| Cellular component | membrane; cytoplasm; mitochondrial inner membrane; extracellular exosome; mitochondrial intermembrane space; mitochondrion |
| Biological process | creatine biosynthetic process; creatine metabolic process; multicellular organism development; learning or memory; muscle atrophy; positive regulation of cold-induced thermogenesis |
Sources:Amigo / QuickGO
Orthologs
| Species | Human | Mouse |
| Entrez | 2628 | 67092 |
| Ensembl | ENSG00000171766 | ENSMUSG00000027199 |
| UniProt | P50440 | Q9D964 |
| RefSeq (mRNA) | NM_001482; NM_001321015 | NM_025961 |
| RefSeq (protein) | NP_001307944; NP_001473 | NP_080237 |
| Location (UCSC) | Chr 15: 45.36 – 45.4 Mb | Chr 2: 122.42 – 122.44 Mb |
| PubMed search |
- Wikidata
| View/Edit Human | View/Edit Mouse |

Glycine amidinotransferase, mitochondrial is an enzyme that in humans is encoded by the GATM gene.

This gene encodes a mitochondrial enzyme that belongs to the Amidinotransferase family. This enzyme is involved in creatine biosynthesis, whereby it catalyzes the transfer of a guanido group from L-arginine to glycine, resulting in guanidinoacetic acid, the immediate precursor of creatine. Mutations in this gene cause arginine:glycine amidinotransferase deficiency, an inborn error of creatine synthesis characterized by mental retardation, language impairment, and behavioral disorders.
