= Arginine:glycine amidinotransferase =

Enzyme

Glycine amidinotransferase
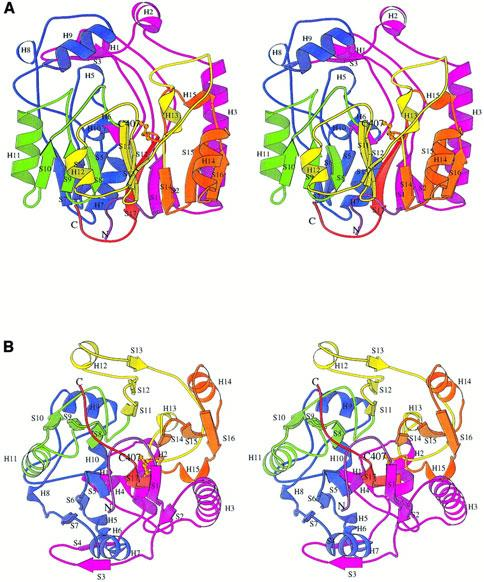
- Stereo view of AGAT in standard orientation with the handles of basket at the top of the model

Identifiers
- EC no.: 2.1.4.1
- CAS no.: 9027-35-4

Databases
- IntEnz: IntEnz view
- BRENDA: BRENDA entry
- ExPASy: NiceZyme view
- KEGG: KEGG entry
- MetaCyc: metabolic pathway
- PRIAM: profile
- PDB structures: RCSB PDB PDBe PDBsum
- Gene Ontology: AmiGO / QuickGO
Search
- PMC: articles
- PubMed: articles
- NCBI: proteins

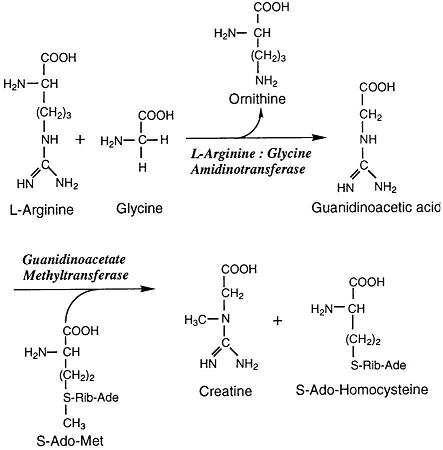
Role of AGAT during creatine synthesis

Transamidination reaction mechanism of AGAT

L-Arginine:glycine amidinotransferase (AGAT; EC 2.1.4.1) is the enzyme that catalyses the transfer of an amidino group from L-arginine to glycine. The products are L-ornithine and glycocyamine, also known as guanidinoacetate, the immediate precursor of creatine. Creatine and its phosphorylated form play a central role in the energy metabolism of muscle and nerve tissues. Creatine is in highest concentrations in the skeletal muscle, heart, spermatozoa and photoreceptor cells. Creatine helps buffer the rapid changes in ADP/ATP ratio in muscle and nerve cells during active periods. Creatine is also synthesized in other tissues, such as pancreas, kidneys, and liver, where amidinotransferase is located in the cytoplasm, including the intermembrane space of the mitochondria, of the cells that make up those tissues.

== Function ==
L-Arginine:glycine amidinotransferase catalyses the first, which is also the committed step in the formation of creatine.

L-arginine
+
glycine
ornithine
+
glycocyamine

The second step of the process, producing the actual creatine molecule, occurs solely in the cytosol, where the second enzyme, S-adenosylmethionine:guanidinoacetate methyltransferase (GAMT), is found. The creatine is then transported through the bloodstream and taken up through sodium-dependent creatine transporters by cells that require creatine.

== Structure ==
The crystal structure of AGAT was determined by Humm, Fritsche, Steinbacher, and Huber of the Max Planck Institute of Biochemistry in Martinsried, Germany in 1997. X-ray examinations of the structure reveal a novel symmetry with fivefold pseudosymmetry of beta beta alphabeta modules. The overall structure of the molecule resembles a basket with handles. The active site lies at the bottom of a long, narrow channel and includes a Cys-His-Asp catalytic triad. The intermediate structure involves the amidino group temporarily covalently bonding to the Cys residue on the catalytic triad, while the His residue takes part in general acid/base catalysis, meaning it acts as a proton donator/receiver itself.

== Reaction ==
The actual reaction catalyzed by AGAT is the synthesis of guanidinoacetate from arginine and glycine, with ornithine as a byproduct. The guanidinoacetate produced is then combined with S-Adenosyl-L-methionine, a reaction catalyzed by GAMT, to produce creatine and S-Adenosyl-L-homocysteine. The mechanism by which the AGAT catalyzes this committed step follows a ping-pong mechanism, and involves the transferring of an amidino group to the Cys407 residue on the protein from L-arginine, which leaves as L-ornithine. The His303 residue then extracts a proton from glycine, which then picks up the amidino group from Cys407 in exchange for a proton to become guanidinoacetate and renew the catalyst.

== Regulation of expression and activity ==
The formation of guanidinoacetate is normally the rate-limiting step of creatine biosynthesis. Consequently, the AGAT reaction is the most likely control step in the pathway, a hypothesis that is supported by a great deal of experimental work. Most important in this respect is the feedback repression of AGAT by creatine, the end-product of the pathway. Cyclocreatine, N-acetimidoylsarcosine, and N-ethylguanidinoacetate display repressor activity like creatine as well. L-Arginine and guanidinoacetate have only "apparent" repressor activity. They exert no effect on AGAT expression by themselves but are readily converted to creatine, which then acts as the true repressor. It has been suggested that AGAT activity in tissues is regulated in a number of ways including induction by growth hormone and thyroxine, inhibition of the enzyme by ornithine, and repression of its synthesis by creatine.

Sex hormones may regulate the activity of AGAT. Treatment of male rats with testosterone propionate increases AGAT activity. In contrast, estrogen treatment decreases AGAT activity and induces weight loss. It is currently unclear whether the changes in the level of AGAT transcript results from altered mRNA stability or enhanced transcriptional rate. If estrogen-mediated alteration results from transcriptional regulation, the site of estrogen action is yet to be determined.

GATM expression within the mouse placenta has been shown to be imprinted meaning only the maternal copy of GATM is expressed . Due to this it is thought that GATM acts as a growth suppressor within the placenta.

== Clinical significance ==
=== Deficiency ===
In 2000, The American Journal of Human Genetics reported two female siblings, aged 4 and 6 years, with intellectual disability and severe creatine deficiency in the brain. Arginine:glycine amidinotransferase (AGAT) catalyzes the first step of creatine synthesis, resulting in the formation of guanidinoacetate, which is a substrate for creatine formation. In two female siblings with intellectual disability who had brain creatine deficiency that was reversible by means of oral creatine supplementation and had low urinary guanidinoacetate concentrations, Arginine:glycine amidinotransferase deficiency was identified as a new genetic defect in creatine metabolism. It is one of three cerebral creatine deficiencies.

Patients with brain creatine deficiency present nonspecific neurologic symptoms, including intellectual disability, language disorders, epilepsy, autistic-like behavior, neurologic deterioration, and movement disorders. A deficiency in AGAT results in a creatine deficiency in the body. The treatment for this is creatine supplements since the body cannot make the creatine on its own. The positive results of creatine treatment (in AGAT deficiencies) and the observation that fetal and early postnatal development are normal in these patients support the hypothesis that earlier diagnosis and treatment can substantially improve the final prognosis of these diseases. Brain 1H-MRS examination is a reliable and minimally invasive technique to assess brain creatine disorders. Because of its limited availability and high cost, the 1H-MRS technique cannot be proposed for all children whose clinical condition suggests the diagnosis of brain creatine depletion.

AGAT deficiency is, along with GAMT and creatine transporter defect, one of three inborn errors of the creatine biosynthesis/transport pathway. The prevalence of these defects is unknown, however they have been observed to occur in high frequency in intellectually disabled children. The actual genetic mutation associated with AGAT involves a tryptophan codon being converted to a stop codon at residue 149.

=== Heart failure ===
Microarray analysis from one report shows a significant decrease in myocardial arginine:glycine amidinotransferase (AGAT) gene expression during the late-stage heart failure. This suggests that the reduced AGAT may correlate with loss of heart function. Increase of AGAT expression in the myocardium after heart failure due to increase in creatine synthesis was associated with favorable outcome.
