= Guanidinoacetate methyltransferase deficiency =

- Other names: GAMT deficiency
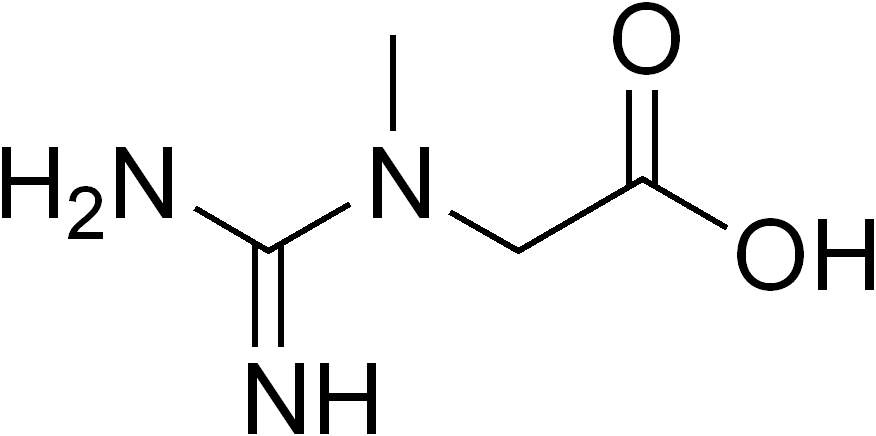
- Specialty: Medical genetics
- Symptoms: Intellectual disability, global developmental delay, speech delay, seizures, behavior disorders, movement disorders
- Causes: Mutation in guanidinoacetate methyltransferase enzyme
- Diagnostic method: Genetic testing, magnetic resonance spectroscopy, blood and urine testing
- Treatment: Dietary adjustment and creatine supplementation

Guanidinoacetate methyltransferase deficiency (GAMT deficiency) is an autosomal recessive cerebral creatine deficiency that primarily affects the nervous system and muscles. It is the first described disorder of creatine metabolism, and results from deficient activity of guanidinoacetate methyltransferase, an enzyme involved in the synthesis of creatine. Clinically, affected individuals most commonly present with developmental delays, behavior disorders, and seizures. Diagnosis can be suspected on clinical findings, and must be confirmed by specific biochemical tests, brain magnetic resonance spectroscopy, or genetic testing as it is a genetic disorder. Biallelic pathogenic variants in the GAMT gene are the underlying cause of the disorder. After GAMT deficiency is diagnosed, it can be treated by dietary adjustments, including supplementation with creatine. Treatment is highly effective if started early in life but is demanding for parents and caretakers with several doses of creatine, L-ornithine and sodium benzoate needed daily. If treatment is started late, it cannot reverse brain damage which has already taken place. The prevalence of GAMT deficiency is estimated to be 1:250,000.

== Signs and symptoms ==
Individuals with GAMT deficiency appear normal at birth with the current hypothesis of trans-placental creatine transport allowing in utero treatment. Shortly after birth, infants may start to show signs, as the consequences of decreased creatine levels in their body become more apparent. Symptoms generally begin during early infancy (3–6 months) to age two years. These clinical findings are relatively non-specific and do not immediately suggest a disorder of creatine metabolism. The most consistent clinical manifestation is developmental delay or intellectual disability, which is observed in all affected individuals, and can range from mild to severe. Most individuals have severe developmental delay or intellectual disability (50-75%). The next most consistent symptom is a behavior disorder, such as hyperactivity, autism, or self-injurious behavior, reported in 75% of GAMT deficient individuals. The third most consistent symptom is seizures, reported in more than 70% of affected individuals. Additional symptoms include movement disorders, such as chorea, athetosis, dystonia or ataxia, observed in about 30% of GAMT patients.

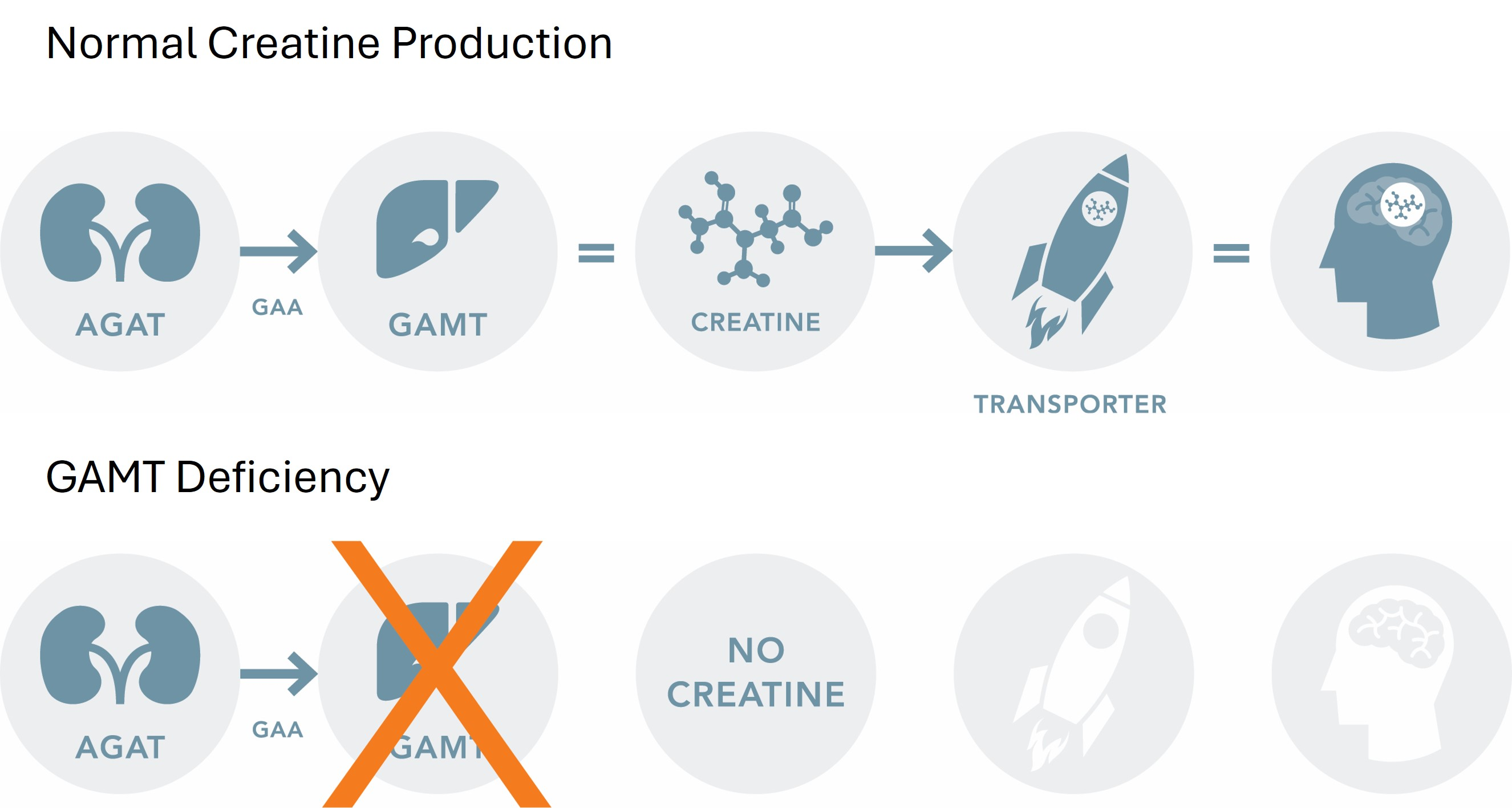
Depiction showing normal creatine production (top) and disrupted creatine production in GAMT deficiency (bottom)

== Genetics ==
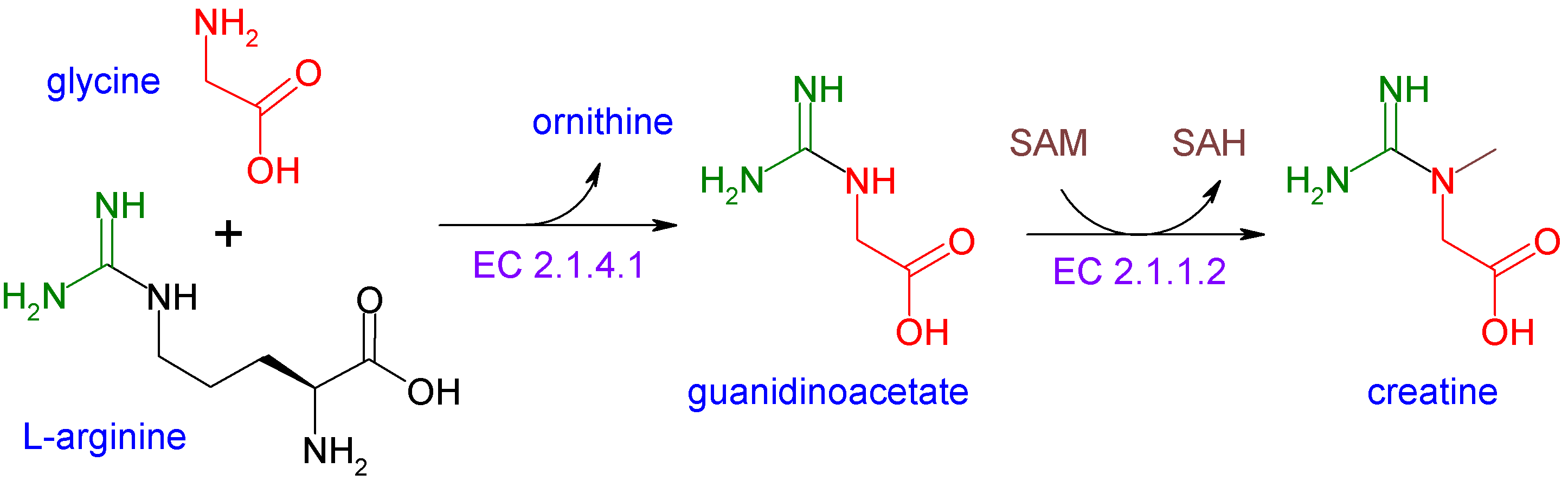
GAMT (EC 2.1.1.2) catalyzes the second step in the creatine biosynthetic pathway.

Biallelic pathogenic variants in GAMT are associated with guanidinoacetate methyltransferase deficiency. Over 70 variants have been reported in the GAMT gene. This gene codes for the enzyme guanidinoacetate methyltransferase (GAMT), which participates in the two-step synthesis of the compound creatine from amino acids glycine, arginine and methionine. Specifically, GAMT controls the second step of the sequence, in which creatine is produced from another compound called guanidinoacetate. GAA is toxic, and because GAMT patients lack the enzyme used to convert GAA to creatine, a build-up of GAA occurs in the brain and other tissues. This accumulation of GAA is thought to cause the more severe symptoms of GATM deficiency. The effects of GAMT deficiency are most severe in organs and tissues that require large amounts of energy, such as the brain and muscles.

This disorder is inherited in an autosomal recessive manner, which means the causative gene is located on an autosome, and two defective copies of the gene – one from each parent – are required to inherit the disorder. The parents both carry one pathogenic variant; however, they are not affected by the disorder. As carriers, the residual activity of approximately 50% is enough to avoid clinical complications. Any siblings of an GAMT deficient individual have a 25% chance of also being GAMT deficient, a 50% chance of being an asymptomatic carrier, and a 25% chance of being unaffected and not a carrier.

== Diagnosis ==
GAMT deficiency can be suspected from clinical findings, although clinical findings are not suggestive of a specific diagnosis. The initial diagnosis is typically established via measurement of creatine, creatinine, and guanidinoacetate in plasma, cerebrospinal fluid, or dried blood spots. These measurements can distinguish among the different cerebral creatine deficiency disorders. In GAMT deficiency, laboratory testing of plasma will show decreased levels of creatine and increased levels of guanidinoacetate. A definitive diagnosis requires DNA sequencing of the GAMT gene and/or GAMT enzymatic activity assays. Brain magnetic resonance spectroscopy can also be used in diagnosis, and will show decreased levels of creatine in affected individuals. However, as this finding is seen in all three cerebral creatine deficiencies, further testing is needed to identify the specific defect.

Treatment is most effective for GAMT deficiency with early diagnosis; however, the non-specific clinical findings mean a diagnosis is often delayed. Due to the efficacy of early treatment and the lengthy typical diagnostic journey, GAMT deficiency has been recommended for newborn screening by the United States Advisory Committee on Heritable Disorders in Newborns and Children. Newborn screening assays measure the amount of guanidinoacetate in a dried blood spot using tandem mass spectrometry. Abnormal results from a newborn screening test still need to be confirmed by testing in plasma or urine.

In the United States, Utah started screening for GAMT deficiency in all newborns in 2015. New York started screening newborns in late 2018. In 2020, a GAMT-positive infant was identified via newborn screening in Utah, thus providing evidence that a case could be identified from newborn screening. A second infant was identified in New York in 2021. In 2022, a federal advisory committee voted to include GAMT in the Recommended Universal Screening Panel starting in January 2023. In addition to New York and Utah, California, Pennsylvania, Connecticut, Delaware, and Michigan all currently screen for GAMT.

Around the world, the state of Victoria, Australia began screening for GAMT in 2004, leading to the diagnosis of a newborn at birth in 2022. In Canada, the provinces of Ontario and British Columbia screen for GAMT.

== Treatment ==
Treatment of GAMT deficiency focuses on restoration of depleted brain creatine with oral creatine supplementation in pharmacologic doses, and removal of toxic intermediate GAA via ornithine supplementation and arginine- or protein-restricted diet. Sodium benzoate supplementation is also sometimes used to decrease GAA levels. All patients are reported to benefit from creatine supplementation, with possible improvements or stabilization in symptoms. Seizures appear to reduce more with dietary arginine restriction and ornithine supplementation. Despite treatment, none of the patients have been reported to return to completely normal developmental level, if significant damage had taken place before treatment. Prior to the addition of GAMT deficiency to newborn screening panels, younger siblings of affected individuals may have been tested at birth and treated early. This early treatment can result in outcomes that are very close to normal.
